= Renshaw (surname) =

Origin
- Meaning: "Ren-wood"
- Region of origin: England

Other names
- Variant forms: Renshae, Ravenshaw, Rainshaw

Renshaw is an Old English locational surname for a village in the area of Prestbury, Cheshire that disappeared before the 17th Century. The suffix -shaw means "wood". The earliest variant spelling Renshae is dated 1561. Other variants include Ravenshaw and Rainshaw. Renshaw is uncommon as a given name.

Notable persons with that surname include:

- Birdsey Renshaw (1911–1948), American neuroscientist
- Deborah Renshaw (born 1975), American racing driver
- Ernest Renshaw (1861–1899), English tennis player
- Graham Renshaw FRSE (1872–1952) British physician and aviculturist
- Jack Renshaw (1909–1987), Australian politician
- John W. Renshaw (1877–1955), Northern Irish politician
- Kate Renshaw (born 1980), Australian play therapist
- Kenneth Renshaw, American violinist
- Mark Renshaw (born 1982), Australian cyclist
- Matthew Renshaw (born 1996), Australian cricketer
- Molly Renshaw (born 1996), English swimmer
- Peter Renshaw, British creative learning consultant
- Richard T. Renshaw (1822–1879), American naval officer
- Rosette Renshaw (1920-1997), Canadian composer and ethnomusicologist
- Samuel Renshaw (1892–1981), American psychologist
- Sharyn Renshaw, Australian lawn bowls player
- Walter Charles Renshaw (1840–1922), British barrister, archaeologist, and genealogist
- William Renshaw (disambiguation), several people

== See also ==
- Renshaw (disambiguation)
- Ravenshaw
