= Ravenshaw =

Origin
- Meaning: "Raven" "wood"
- Region of origin: England

Other names
- Variant forms: Ranshaw, Ramshaw, Renshaw, Renishaw, Renshall, Ravenshaw

Ravenshaw is an English surname from Derbyshire, County Durham, Northumberland, and Warwickshire. There are various theories to the meaning, but the simplest is "raven" (either a bird or a personal name), and "wood". The oldest historical record of a surname variant was that of "Stephen de Ravenshagh", 1332, Lancashire. There are other variants. Ravenshaw is uncommon as a given name.

People with the surname include:

- Edward Vincent Ravenshaw (1854–1880), Scottish footballer
- Hurdis Ravenshaw (1869 – c. 1920), British Army officer
- John Goldsborough Ravenshaw II, (1777–1840), chairman of the British East India Company
- Thomas Edward Ravenshaw (1827–1914), educator, founder of Ravenshaw College, and a member of the British East India Company

== See also ==
- Renshaw (disambiguation)
