= CS Royal Yacht =

Confederate schooner in the American Civil War

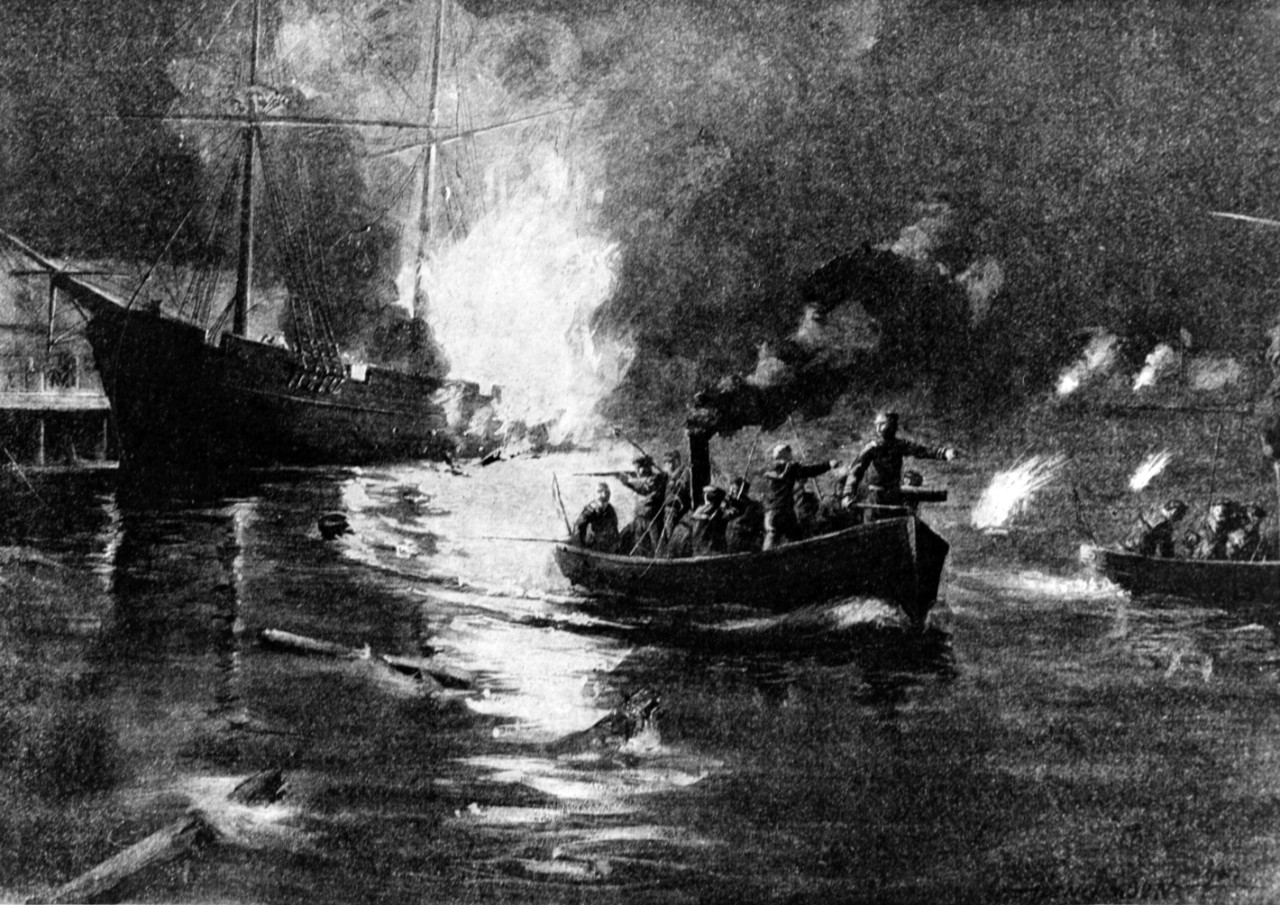
CS Royal Yacht is destroyed by sailors of the USS Santee.

The Confederate Ship Royal Yacht (CS Royal Yacht) was a small pilot schooner captained by Commodore Thomas Chubb and partly owned by his father, Charles Chubb. It was associated with the Confederate Navy in the American Civil War (1861–1865). During the 1861 blockade of Galveston, Texas, by the Union Navy, the Royal Yacht unsuccessfully took part in the harbour's defense. On November 8, 1861, the crew was captured and the vessel set ablaze by a boarding party from the USS Santee led by Lieutenant James Edward Jouett (later promoted to Rear Admiral in the United States Navy). Although repaired and redeployed in 1862, the schooner and Commodore Chubb were later recaptured by the USS William G. Anderson on April 15, 1863.

== History ==
=== Charter in the American Civil War ===
The Royal Yacht was reputed to be the fastest schooner on the Texas Coast and was captained by mariner Thomas Chubb. At the start of the American Civil War, the vessel was chartered by Flag Officer William W. Hunter of the Confederate States Navy (CSN) on 10 October 1861. Chubb, who co-owned the vessel with his father (Charles Chubb), adopted the courtesy title of Commodore. The vessel was deployed to patrol the Galveston harbour in Texas against marauding Union Navy ships. Five days later, she was damaged by a violent squall which caused the loss of her bowsprit. She was armed and repaired by October 23, and went on station between the Bolivar and East Points in Galveston.

=== Damage and capture during the blockade of Galveston ===
On November 8, 1861, the Royal Yacht was caught in a surprise attack launched from the USS Santee at 02:30 AM while she was anchored outside Bolivar Point Lighthouse. The captain of the Santee, Commodore Henry Eagle, and Lieutenant James Edward Jouett planned to capture or destroy the steamer CSS General Rusk, which was anchored near Pelican Spit, Galveston. The initial plan to enter through Bolivar Roads was abandoned when the first launch ran aground near the Rusk, alerting Confederate sentries to the attack. As Jouett led his men back towards the Santee, they encountered the CS Royal Yacht at 02:30 AM. Planning to either capture or disable the vessel, the first launch came under heavy friendly fire from the second Union launch, leading to two deaths. Eventually, Gunner William Carter and Jouett boarded the schooner and held the Confederate crew hostage while the rest of the men on their launch boarded.

However, a general retreat was mistakenly sounded by the second launch crew, causing the Union troops to flee the ship they had just captured. Although Jouett and Carter were on board unsupported for a short while, their troops returned and the schooner was captured. The thirteen Confederate prisoners, including Chubb, were escorted to the USS Santee and later paroled. For his actions, Jouett was commended by Rear Admiral David Farragut of the West Gulf Blockading Squadron.

At 03:30 AM, the watch on another patrol vessel, the CS Bayou City, lowered their boats to investigate the fire on board the Royal Yacht and extinguished it minutes before the magazine exploded. At 09:00 AM, the Royal Yacht was towed alongside the CSS General Rusk to remove arms and ammunition. Her upper hamper was ruined but the hull was intact. On November 11, she was returned to Captain Charles Chubb.

=== Later service and recapture by Union forces ===
On May 10, 1862, Colonel Joseph J. Cook of the Confederate States Artillery asked Commander William Hunter to provide Captain Thomas Chubb with the arms and equipment to fit out the schooner for harbour service. The Royal Yacht is known to have served again with CS Bayou City off Galveston as late as the end of October 1862. Some time during the next five months, she was fitted out as a blockade runner for the Confederate forces during the Gulf Blockade. On April 15, 1863, the schooner engaged in a chase with the USS William G. Anderson, a gunboat of the Union Navy, while carrying bales of cotton. Although the Anderson was initially unable to catch the Royal Yacht, she came within shooting distance after a six-hour chase and forced Captain Chubb to surrender.
