= Santee =

Santee may refer to:

== People ==
- Santee (surname)
- Santee Smith, Canadian Mohawk artist, dancer, designer, producer and choreographer
- Santee Dakota, a subgroup of the Native American Dakota tribe
- Santee (South Carolina), a Native American tribe which once lived in South Carolina

== Places in the United States ==
- Santee, California, a city
  - Santee station, a San Diego Trolley station
- Santee Sioux Reservation, Nebraska
  - Santee, Nebraska, principal village on the reservation
- Santee, South Carolina, a town
- Santee (Corbin, Virginia), a plantation home on the National Register of Historic Places
- Lake Santee, Indiana, a reservoir and census-designated place
- Santee National Wildlife Refuge, South Carolina
- Santee State Park, South Carolina
- Santee River, South Carolina
- Santee Canal, South Carolina, one of the earliest canals built in the United States
- Santee Branch, a stream in Mississippi

== Other uses ==
- Santee Education Complex, Los Angeles, California
- Santee (film), a 1973 western starring Glenn Ford
- Santee (plumbing), a tee joint in a sanitation line
- USS Santee, various ships of the United States Navy

== See also ==
- Santi (disambiguation)
- Santy, a computer worm released in 2004
