= List of shipwrecks in March 1861 =

The list of shipwrecks in March 1861 includes ships sunk, foundered, wrecked, grounded, or otherwise lost during March 1861.

== 1 March ==
List of shipwrecks: 1 March 1861
| Ship | State | Description |
|---|---|---|
| Ann | United Kingdom | The schooner collided with Royal George (United Kingdom) in the North Sea and was severely damaged. She was on a voyage from North Shields, County Durham to Dundee, Forfarshire. She put back to North Shields, where she was beached. |
| Anna | Kingdom of Hanover | The brig was driven ashore at Maistra, Ottoman Empire. She was on a voyage from Newcastle upon Tyne, Northumberland, United Kingdom to Venice, Kingdom of Lombardy–Venetia. Anna was later refloated and resumed her voyage. She arrived at Venice on 11 March. |
| Elvira | United Kingdom | The brig was driven ashore at Kingsdown, Kent. She was on a voyage from Agrigento, Sicily to London. She was refloated and taken in tow for London. |
| Mary Ann | United Kingdom | The ship was run ashore at Egremont, Cumberland. |
| Merton | United Kingdom | The schooner was driven ashore east of Swansea, Glamorgan. She was on a voyage from Swansea to Devoran, Cornwall. |
| News | United Kingdom | The brig collided with the schooner Princess Royal (United Kingdom) and sank in the North Sea. Her crew were rescued by Princess Royal. News was on a voyage from London to South Shields, County Durham. |
| Othello | France | The schooner foundered in the English Channel off the Isle of Wight, United Kingdom. Her crew were rescued by a Dutch vessel. She was on a voyage from Nantes, Loire-Inférieure to Abbeville, Somme. |
| Tartar | United Kingdom | The ship ran aground on the Holm Sand, in the North Sea off the coast of Suffolk. She was on a voyage from Newcastle upon Tyne, Northumberland to Bristol, Gloucestershire. She was refloated and assisted in to Lowestoft, Suffolk in a leaky condition. |
| Tres Amigos | Portugal | The barque ran aground on Governors Island, Massachusetts, United States. She was on a voyage from East Harbor to Boston, Massachusetts. |
| Willem III | Netherlands | The ship ran aground on the Sternbaker, off Brielle, South Holland. |

== 2 March ==
List of shipwrecks: 2 March 1861
| Ship | State | Description |
|---|---|---|
| Brederode | Netherlands | The full-rigged ship ran aground on the Hompelvoet Bank, off Brouwershaven, Zeeland. |
| Conquest | United Kingdom | The ship was driven ashore in Carnarvon Bay. Her crew were rescued. She was on a voyage from Mobile, Alabama, Confederate States of America to Liverpool, Lancashire. She broke up on 6 March. |
| Fanny | Hamburg | The schooner ran aground on the Gelbsand, in the North Sea. She was refloated and taken in to Cuxhaven in a leaky condition. |
| Frouw Wopken | Kingdom of Hanover | The tjalk was driven ashore and wrecked near "Eitzenloch". Her crew were rescued. She was on a voyage from Rhauderfehn to Hamburg. |
| Picolet | Hamburg | The ship was driven ashore at Boulogne, Pas-de-Calais, France. Her crew were rescued. She was on a voyage from Saint Domingo to Hamburg. |

== 3 March ==
List of shipwrecks: 3 March 1861
| Ship | State | Description |
|---|---|---|
| Alice | United Kingdom | The ship ran aground on the Girdler Sand. She was on a voyage from Aberystwyth, Cardiganshire to London. She was refloated and assisted in to Ramsgate, Kent in a leaky condition. |
| Elegant | United Kingdom | The brig ran aground off Lowestoft, Suffolk. She was refloated with assistance and taken in to Lowestoft. |
| Ersteling | Netherlands | The ship was driven ashore near Helsingør, Denmark. She was on a voyage from Schiedam, South Holland to a Baltic port. |
| Jeune Elore | France | The schooner collided with a brig and was run ashore at Dymchurch, Kent. She was on a voyage from Seaham, County Durham, United Kingdom to Cherbourg, Seine-Inférieure. She was refloated, but was struck by a squall and foundered in the English Channel off the Kent cost. |
| Jeune Marie Theresa, and Perseverance | France; United Kingdom) | The brig Jeune Marie Theresa was driven into the barque Perseverance and sank on the Whiting Sand, in the North Sea off the coast of Suffolk, United Kingdom. Her crew were rescued. She was on a voyage from Hartlepool, County Durham to Lisbon, Portugal. Perseverance was severely damaged. |
| Johannes | Netherlands | The galiot foundered in the North Sea. Her crew were rescued by the smack Saucy Lass (United Kingdom). Johannes was on a voyage from Stockton-on-Tees, County Durham to Vlissingen, Zeeland. |
| John Cunningham | United Kingdom | The ship was driven onto the Whiting Sand and was abandoned by her crew. She was on a voyage from Sunderland, County Durham to London. |
| Louisa | United Kingdom | The brig ran aground off Lowestoft. She was refloated with assistance and taken in to Lowestoft. |
| Ruthenia | United Kingdom | The ship sank at Réunion with the loss of three of her crew. Survivors were rescued by Duke of Malakoff (United Kingdom). Ruthenia was on a voyage from Callao, Peru to Mauritius. |
| Sardus | United Kingdom | The brigantine struck a sandbank and foundered in the English Channel 2 nautical miles (3.7 km) off Selsey Bill, Sussex. Her crew were rescued. She was on a voyage from Newcastle upon Tyne, Northumberland to Cork. |
| Triumph | (United Kingdom of Great Britain and Ireland) Jersey | The brig ran aground off Lowestoft. She was refloated with assistance and taken in to Lowestoft. |

== 4 March ==
List of shipwrecks: 4 March 1861
| Ship | State | Description |
|---|---|---|
| Alfred and Adelaide | France | The lugger foundered 80 nautical miles (150 km) east north east of the Gallopers Sandbank, in the North Sea off the coast of Suffolk, United Kingdom. Her crew were rescued. |
| Beaver | United States | The ship was driven ashore at Hellevoetsluis, Zeeland, Netherlands. She was on a voyage from Boston, Massachusetts to Rotterdam, South Holland. She was refloated and taken in to Hellevoetsluis. |
| Eburn | United Kingdom | The ship was driven ashore at Dunkirk, Nord, France. She was on a voyage from Middlesbrough, Yorkshire to Dunkirk. She was refloated and taken in to Dunkirk, where she sank. |
| Ellerslie | United Kingdom | The full-rigged ship was wrecked on the Kentish Knock. Her twenty crew were rescued. She was on a voyage from South Shields, County Durham to Cartagena, Spain and Quebec City, Province of Canada, British North America. |
| Emm | United Kingdom | The ship was driven ashore at Dunkirk. She was on a voyage from Middlesbrough to Dunkirk. |
| Hawk | United Kingdom | The fishing smack was run into by the steamship African and sank in the River Mersey with the loss of three of her five crew. |
| Hotspur | United Kingdom | The sloop was wrecked in the Farne Islands, Northumberland. Her crew were rescued. She was on a voyage from Eyemouth, Berwickshire to Newcastle upon Tyne, Northumberland. |
| Isabella | United Kingdom | The barque was driven ashore at Sulina, Ottoman Empire. |
| Jeune Flore | France | The schooner foundered in the English Channel off Dymchurch, Kent, United Kingdom. Her crew were rescued. She was on a voyage from Seaham, County Durham to Cherbourg, Manche. |
| Oak | United Kingdom | The ship ran aground on the Stoney Binks, off the mouth of the Humber. She was on a voyage from Sunderland, County Durham to London. She was refloated and resumed her voyage. |
| Olive | United Kingdom | The ship was wrecked on the Woolpack Sand, in the English Channel off the coast of Sussex. Her crew were rescued. She was on a voyage from Newcastle upon Tyne to Cork. |
| Rauma | (Russian Empire) Grand Duchy of Finland | The full-rigged ship exploded and sank off Padstow, Cornwall, United Kingdom. Eight of her twenty crew reached land in a boat. Another eight were rescued by Jane Marshall (United Kingdom). The remainder were listed as missing, presumed drowned. She was on a voyage from Cardiff, Glamorgan, United Kingdom to Gibraltar. |

== 5 March ==
List of shipwrecks: 5 March 1861
| Ship | State | Description |
|---|---|---|
| America | United Kingdom | The ship ran aground on the Pluckington Bank, in Liverpool Bay. She was on a voyage from Liverpool, Lancashire to New York, United States. She was refloated and towed in to Liverpool. |
| Catherine | United Kingdom | The smack was driven ashore in Lochalsh. She was on a voyage from Liverpool, Lancashire to Leith, Lothian. She was refloated on 11 March. |
| Champion | United Kingdom | The steamship was driven ashore by ice at Galaţi, Ottoman Empire. |
| Gazelle | United Kingdom | The brig was driven ashore at Boulogne, Pas-de-Calais, France. Her crew survived. She was on a voyage from Sunderland, County Durham to Boulogne. |
| James Duff | United Kingdom | The schooner was driven ashore and wrecked at Peterhead, Aberdeenshire. Her crew were rescued by a pilot boat. She was on a voyage from Newcastle upon Tyne, Northumberland to the Moray Firth. |
| Janus | United Kingdom | The brig was driven ashore by ice near Galaţi. |
| Johannes | Netherlands | The ship foundered in the North Sea. Her crew survived. She was on a voyage from Vlissingen, Zeeland to Stockton-on-Tees, County Durham, United Kingdom. |
| John and Mary | United Kingdom | The ship was driven ashore and wrecked at Ayr. Her crew were rescued. She was on a voyage from the Strangford Lough to Ayr. |
| Mary Kingsland | United States | The Yacht was wrecked 15 miles south of Jupiter Inlet Light, Florida in a gale and was left high and dry. All on board rescued after several days by "Cahawba" |
| Monarch | United States | The 406-ton sidewheel paddle steamer sank in the Ohio River at Louisville, Kentucky, during a voyage to New Orleans, Louisiana. She was raised, repaired, and returned to service, becoming the ram Monarch (United States Army, later USS Monarch United States Navy). |
| Norval | United Kingdom | The ship ran aground on the Pluckington Bank. She was on a voyage from Liverpool to Cuba. She was refloated the next day and taken in to the River Mersey. |
| William and Mary | United Kingdom | The ship ran aground in the Solway Firth and was run ashore at Newbie, Dumfriesshire. She was on a voyage from Bangor to Port Carlisle, Cumberland. |

== 6 March ==
List of shipwrecks: 6 March 1861
| Ship | State | Description |
|---|---|---|
| Blossom | United Kingdom | The schooner was driven ashore on Lindisfarne, Northumberland. |
| Danube | United Kingdom | The ship was abandoned off Dartmouth, Devon with the loss of a crew member. She was on a voyage from New Orleans, Louisiana to Liverpool, Lancashire. |
| Diadem | United Kingdom | The schooner struck the Sow and Pigs Rocks, off the coast of Northumberland and was consequently beached near Cambois, Northumberland. She was on a voyage from the River Tyne to Dundee, Forfarshire. She broke up that night. |
| Elizabeth | United Kingdom | The schooner was driven onto the Clipera Rocks, off Anglesey. Her crew were rescued by the Holyhead Lifeboat. She was later refloated and taken in to Holyhead. |
| Emile and Fernand | France | The ship foundered in the Mediterranean Sea 50 nautical miles (93 km) west of Sardinia with the loss of seven of her ten crew. She was on a voyage from Marseille, Bouches-du-Rhône to Cayenne. |
| Empress | United Kingdom | The ship was driven ashore near Westport, County Mayo. She was on a voyage from Leith, Lothian to Galway. She was refloated on 9 March. |
| Excel | United Kingdom | The schooner was wrecked on the Brazil Bank, in the Irish Sea off the coast of Lancashire. Her crew were rescued by the Liverpool Lifeboat. She was on a voyage from Swansea, Glamorgan to Liverpool, Lancashire. |
| Hazard | Sweden | The ship sank in the North Sea 3 nautical miles (5.6 km) off Zuydcoote, Nord, France. She was on a voyage from Newcastle upon Tyne, Northumberland. United Kingdom to Lisbon, Portugal. |
| John and Susan | United Kingdom | The ship was driven ashore on Lindisfarne. |
| Joshua | United Kingdom | The schooner was wrecked at Whitehaven, Cumberland. Her crew were rescued. She was on a voyage from Liverpool, Lancashire to Whitehaven. |
| Liberal | United Kingdom | The schooner was driven into the schooner Adonis (United Kingdom) and was then driven ashore on Lindisfarne. |
| Merinus en Gertruida | Netherlands | The galiot was abandoned in the Atlantic Ocean. Her crew were rescued by Kelvin (United Kingdom). Merinus en Gertruida was on a voyage from Rotterdam, South Holland to New York City, United States. |
| Rebecca | United Kingdom | The ship was driven ashore 2 nautical miles (3.7 km) east of Dunkirk, Nord, France. Her crew were rescued. She was on a voyage from Middlesbrough, Yorkshire to Dunkirk. |

== 7 March ==
List of shipwrecks: 7 March 1861
| Ship | State | Description |
|---|---|---|
| Atlas | United Kingdom | The derelict ship was taken in to Falmouth, Cornwall. |
| Atlas | United Kingdom | The schooner was driven ashore at Great Yarmouth, Norfolk. She was on a voyage from Hartlepool, County Durham to Lisbon, Portugal. She was refloated and taken in to Great Yarmouth. |
| Danube | United Kingdom | The ship was wrecked on Sarn Badrig, in Carnarvon Bay with the loss of one of her 25 crew. Seven survivors reached shore in a boat, the remainder were rescued by the Criccieth Lifeboat. She was on a voyage from New Orleans, Louisiana, Confederate States of America to Liverpool, Lancashire. |
| D. B. Sexton | United States | The schooner was driven ashore in the Danube near Reni, United Principalities. |
| Diadem | United Kingdom | The schooner ran aground on the Sow and Pigs Rocks, off the coast of Northumberland. She was consequently beached at Cambois, Northumberland. She floated off during the night and sank. |
| John and Mary | United Kingdom | The sloop was beached in Campbeltown Bay. She was on a voyage from Easdale, Argyllshire to Dundee, Forfarshire. |
| Mary Aut | United Kingdom | The Yorkshire Billyboy was abandoned in the North Sea. Her crew were rescued by the smack Lioness (United Kingdom). Mary Ann was on a voyage from Newcastle upon Tyne, Northumberland to Ipswich, Suffolk. Mary Aut was subsequently towed in to Bridlington, Yorkshire. |
| Petrel | United Kingdom | The ship was destroyed by fire at Leven, Fife. |
| Priscilla | United Kingdom | The ship was driven ashore in Loch Indaal. She was on a voyage from Troon, Ayrshire to Havana, Cuba. She was refloated on 14 March and taken in to Lamlash, Isle of Arran. |
| St. Joseph | France | The ship ran aground at Port Napoleon, Bouches-du-Rhône. She was on a voyage from Marseille, Bouches-du-Rhône to Buenos Aires, Argentina. She was refloated with the assistance of three tugs and towed back to Marseille, where she sank overnight. |

== 8 March ==
List of shipwrecks: 8 March 1861
| Ship | State | Description |
|---|---|---|
| Atlas | United Kingdom | The schooner was abandoned in the North Sea 40 nautical miles (74 km) off the Lemon and Ower Sand (53°21′N 3°32′W). Her crew were rescued by the schooner Ganymede (Denmark). Atlas was on a voyage from Stockton-on-Tees, County Durham to Calais, France. |
| Catharina | Netherlands | The ship was driven ashore near Katwijk, South Holland. Her crew were rescued. She was on a voyage from Newcastle upon Tyne, Northumberland, United Kingdom to Middelburg, Zeeland. |
| Gazelle | United Kingdom | The brig was driven ashore near Audresselles, Pas-de-Calais, France. Her crew were rescued. |
| Malakoff | United Kingdom | The ship ran aground on the Shipwash Sand, in the North Sea off the coast of Suffolk. She was on a voyage from Sunderland, County Durham to King George Sound. Malakoff was later refloated and taken in to Gravesend, Kent. |
| Star | Austrian Empire | The schooner was driven ashore and wrecked at Ambleteuse, Pas-de-Calais with the loss of seven of her nine crew. She was on a voyage from Constantinople, Ottoman Empire to London, United Kingdom. |
| Wagram | United Kingdom | The ship was wrecked near Serracapriola, Kingdom of the Two Sicilies. She was reported to be on a voyage from South Shields, County Durham to Marseille, Bouches-du-Rhône, France. |

== 9 March ==
List of shipwrecks: 9 March 1861
| Ship | State | Description |
|---|---|---|
| Augusta | (United Kingdom of Great Britain and Ireland) Jersey | The barque was abandoned in the Atlantic Ocean. Her crew were rescued by City of Boston (United States). Augusta was on a voyage from New York, United States to Jersey. |
| Fortuna | Sweden | The barque was run down and sunk in the English Channel off Dungenes, Kent, United Kingdom by Julia (United States). Her nine crew survived - a crew member was rescued by Julia, the rest by the lugger England's Glory (United Kingdom). Fortuna was on a voyage from Hull, Yorkshire to Rio de Janeiro, Brazil. |
| Jacinta | United Kingdom | The ship was driven ashore at Breaksea Point, Glamorgan. She was on a voyage from São Miguel Island, Azores to Bristol, Gloucestershire. She was refloated the next day. |
| Novi Klas | Flag unknown | The ship was driven onto the Cockle Sand, in the North Sea off the coast of Norfolk, United Kingdom. She was on a voyage from Sulina, Ottoman Empire to Leith, Lothian, United Kingdom. She was refloated. |

== 10 March ==
List of shipwrecks: 10 March 1861
| Ship | State | Description |
|---|---|---|
| Betsey | United Kingdom | The schooner collided with the brig Unione (France) and was abandoned off Cape St Vincent, Portugal. Her crew were rescued. She was on a voyage from Pomaron, Portugal to the Clyde. |
| Black Prince | United Kingdom | The Warrior-class ironclad ran aground in the Clyde near Greenock, Renfrewshire. |
| Elizabeth, and Mary Ann | United Kingdom | The schooners collided in the Gull Stream. Elizabeth was on a voyage from Hartlepool, County Durham to Exeter, Devon. She put in to Ramsgate, Kent. Mary Ann was on a voyage from Middlesbrough, Yorkshire to Exeter. She put in to Ramsgate in a severely leaky condition. |
| Enchantress | United Kingdom | The ship was driven ashore near Hellevoetsluis, Zeeland, Netherlands. |
| Giuletta | United Kingdom | The brig ran aground on the Holme Sand, in the North Sea off the coast of Suffolk, United Kingdom. She was on a voyage from Grimsby, Lincolnshire to London, United Kingdom. She was refloated. |
| Holyrood | United Kingdom | The ship was driven ashore near Hellevoetsluis. |
| Lord Raglan | United Kingdom | The steamship ran aground near Hellevoetsluis. She was on a voyage from the River Tyne to Rotterdam, South Holland, Netherlands. She was refloated. |
| Middlesex | United States | The ship was abandoned in the Atlantic Ocean (53°00′N 22°10′W) with the loss of 46 of the 60 people on board. She was on a voyage from Liverpool, Lancashire, United Kingdom to New York. |
| Place | United Kingdom | The dandy was run into by the barque Warteroath (United Kingdom) off Portland, Dorset and was abandoned by her four crew. She was subsequently taken in to Weymouth, Dorset in a derelict condition by the schooner Edith Maria (United Kingdom). |
| Royal George | United Kingdom | The ship was wrecked at Doboy, Queensland. She was on a voyage from Doboy to a British port. |
| Sir Allan McNab | United Kingdom | The brig was wrecked near Courtown, County Wexford with the loss of one of her five crew. |
| T. C. Sutton | United Kingdom | The ship was run into in the Gull Stream. She was on a voyage from Torquay, Devon to Hartlepool. She put in to Ramsgate in a severely damaged condition. |
| Theodore | United Kingdom | The brig collided with the steamship Henry Morton (United Kingdom) and sank in the North Sea off Filey, Yorkshire. Her crew were rescued by Henry Morton. Theodore was on a voyage from Sunderland, County Durham to Portsmouth, Hampshire. |

== 11 March ==
List of shipwrecks: 11 March 1861
| Ship | State | Description |
|---|---|---|
| Ann Armstrong | United Kingdom | The ship ran aground near "Nelson Point", Somerset. She was on a voyage from Bristol, Gloucestershire to Liverpool, Lancashire. She was refloated on 13 March and taken in to the King Road. |
| Aurora | United Kingdom | The ship ran aground at Whitby, Yorkshire. She was refloated and taken in to Whitby. |
| Breeze | United Kingdom | The ship ran aground in Bootle Bay. She was on a voyage from Liverpool to Cork. She was refloated and towed in to Liverpool. |
| Chieftain Cleveland | United States | The barque was driven ashore at "Manzare". She was on a voyage from Sebastopol, Russia to Marseille, Bouches-du-Rhône, France. She was refloated. |
| Coquet | Denmark | The ship was driven ashore on Læsø. She was on a voyage from Grangemouth, Stirlingshire, United Kingdom to Copenhagen. |
| Dahlia | France | The ship was destroyed by fire at Paimbœuf, Loire-Inférieure. Her crew were rescued. She was on a voyage from Nantes, Loire-Inférieure to Brest, Finistère. |
| Destin | France | The full-rigged ship was driven ashore at Palma de Mallorca, Spain. |
| Electra | United Kingdom | The schooner ran aground on The Shingles, off the Isle of Wight. She was on a voyage from São Miguel Island, Azores to London. She was refloated and resumed her voyage. |
| Königsberg | Prussia | The ship ran aground in the River Mersey. She was on a voyage from Liverpool, Lancashire, United Kingdom to Constantinople, Ottoman Empire. She was refloated. |
| Margaret Wood | United Kingdom | The sloop struck a sunken rock off the coast of Morayshire and was abandoned by her crew, who were rescued. She was on a voyage from Easdale, Argyllshire to Leith, Lothian. Margaret Wood was subsequently towed in to Portsoy, Aberdeenshire. |
| Palender | United Kingdom | The Mersey Flat was driven ashore and wrecked at Porthor, Caernarfonshire with the loss of all but one of her crew. She was on a voyage from Barmouth, Merionethshire to Drogheda, County Louth. |
| Ranger | United Kingdom | The ship was beached at Grimsby, Lincolnshire. |
| Susan G. Owens | Confederate States of America | The ship was driven ashore on Folly Island, South Carolina. She was on a voyage from Newport, Monmouthshire, United Kingdom to Charleston, South Carolina. |

== 12 March ==
List of shipwrecks: 12 March 1861
| Ship | State | Description |
|---|---|---|
| Albatross | France | The ship was driven ashore on the Île de Ré, Charente-Inférieure. She was on a voyage from Goree, Zeeland, Netherlands to Bordeaux, Gironde. |
| Ariosto | United Kingdom | The brig was driven ashore and wrecked near Milltown Malbay, County Clare with the loss of five of her ten crew. She was on a voyage from Limerick to Philadelphia, Pennsylvania, United states. |
| Aurora | United Kingdom | The ship was wrecked near San Cataldo di Lecce, Kingdom of the Two Sicilies. She was on a voyage from Venice, Kingdom of Lombardy–Venetia to Falmouth, Cornwall. |
| Cultivateur | France | The ship was wrecked at Saint Ouen, Jersey, Channel Islands with the loss of four of her crew. She was on a voyage from Dublin, United Kingdom to Rouen, Seine-Inférieure. |
| Elizabeth | United Kingdom | The schooner was driven ashore at the Mumbles, Glamorgan. She was on a voyage from Llanelly, Glamorgan to Par, Cornwall. |
| Favourite | United Kingdom | The schooner ran aground near Brunsbüttel, Duchy of Schleswig. She was on a voyage from Hamburg to Poole, Dorset. She was refloated and towed in to Cuxhaven in a severely leaky condition. |
| Joseph Marie | France | The brig was driven ashore in Camaret Bay. She was on a voyage from Liverpool, Lancashire, United Kingdom to the Rio Pongo. |
| Judith | United Kingdom | The ship was wrecked near "Sagua", Cuba. All on board were rescued. She was on a voyage from Calcutta, India to New Orleans, Louisiana, Confederate States of America. |
| Koningen Caroline Amalie | Norway | The ship ran aground and was wrecked off Skjern, Denmark. She was on a voyage from Newcastle upon Tyne, Northumberland, United Kingdom to Copenhagen, Denmark. |
| Pocahontas | Confederate States of America | The ship ran aground on the Molasses Key. She was on a voyage from New Orleans, Louisiana to Liverpool. She was refloated on 11 March and taken in to Key West, Florida. |
| St Pierre | France | The lugger was driven ashore and sank in the River Avon at Nelson Point. She was on a voyage from Llanelly, Glamorgan, United Kingdom to La Rochelle, Charente-Inférieure. St Pierre was refloated on 13 March and taken in to the King Road. She was taken in to Bristol, Gloucestershire, United Kingdom on 22 March. |
| William Mason | United Kingdom | The schooner collided with Queen of the West (United Kingdom) and sank in the Atlantic Ocean with the loss of a crew member. Survivors were rescued by Queen of the West. William Mason was on a voyage from Franklin, Georgia to Baltimore, Maryland, United States. |

== 13 March ==
List of shipwrecks: 13 March 1861
| Ship | State | Description |
|---|---|---|
| Heloise | France | The chasse-marée was wrecked at Cape Breton. |
| Louis | Bavaria | The steamship was in collision with another steamship and sank in Lake Constance with the loss of thirteen lives. |
| Marie | (United Kingdom of Great Britain and Ireland) Isle of Man | The smack was damaged by fire at Whitehaven, Cumberland. |
| Selina | United Kingdom | The brig was run down and sunk in the Sea of Marmora by Virginia ( Kingdom of Sardinia). Her nine crew were rescued. She was on a voyage from Brăila, Ottoman Empire to an English port. |

== 14 March ==
List of shipwrecks: 14 March 1861
| Ship | State | Description |
|---|---|---|
| Othello | United Kingdom | The barque departed from Liverpool, Lancashire for St. John's, Newfoundland, British North America. No further trace, presumed foundered with the loss of all hands. |
| Ste Marie | France | The lugger collided with the brig Peter and Wilhelm (Denmark) and was abandoned in the English Channel off the coast of Sussex, United Kingdom. Her ten crew were rescued by Peter and Wilhelm. |

== 15 March ==
List of shipwrecks: 15 March 1861
| Ship | State | Description |
|---|---|---|
| Cecilia | United Kingdom | The ship ran aground in the Duddon Estuary. She was on a voyage from Whitehaven, Cumberland to Cardiff, Glamorgan. She was later refloated. |
| Despina | Greece | The brig foundered near the entrance to the Bosphorus with the loss of all but one of her crew. |
| Earl Grey | United Kingdom | The ship capsized at Caen, Calvados, France. |
| Eftemia | United Principalities | The brig was wrecked at "Amondis", Ottoman Empire. Her crew were rescued. She was on a voyage from Brăila, Ottoman Empire to Corfu, United States of the Ionian Islands. |
| Gem | United Kingdom | The brig ran aground at Wells-next-the-Sea, Norfolk. She was on a voyage from Wells-next-the-Sea to Newcastle upon Tyne, Northumberland. She was refloated and put back to Wells-next-the-Sea. |
| Georgiana | United Kingdom | The brig was driven ashore and wrecked near Dunmore East, County Waterford. Her crew survived. |
| Latona | United Kingdom | The barque ran aground in the Scheldt. She was on a voyage from Antwerp, Belgium to Sunderland, County Durham. She was refloated and resumed her voyage. |
| Leveret | (United Kingdom of Great Britain and Ireland) Jersey | The cutter was discovered derelict off Langney, Sussex. |
| Restless | United Kingdom | The brig collided with Cameo (United Kingdom) and sank in the North Sea off Sea Palling, Norfolk. Her crew were rescued. She was on a voyage from London to Sunderland, County Durham. |
| Undine | Hamburg | The ship ran aground in the Elbe. She was on a voyage from Liverpool, Lancashire, United Kingdom to Hamburg. She was refloated with assistance from the steamship Assecuradeur (Flag unknown) and resumed her voyage. |
| Union | France | The brig collided with the schooner Betsey (United Kingdom)and was beached near Cabo de Santa Maria, Portugal. Union was on a voyage from Alexandria, Egypt to Dunkirk, Nord. She was declared a total loss. |
| Wren | (United Kingdom of Great Britain and Ireland) British North America | The schooner was abandoned in the Atlantic Ocean. Her crew were rescued by the schooner Edward Herbert (Flag unknown). Wren was on a voyage from Matanzas, Cuba to New York, United States. |

== 16 March ==
List of shipwrecks: 16 March 1861
| Ship | State | Description |
|---|---|---|
| Antina | Kingdom of Hanover | The ship was wrecked at the entrance to the Agger Canal, Denmark. All on board were rescued. She was on a voyage from Leer to Königsberg, Prussia. |
| Astrea | Rostock | The barque struck the Wolf Rock, Cornwall, United Kingdom and foundered with the loss of nine of her twelve crew. Survivors were rescued by the lugger Woodpecker and another lugger (both United Kingdom). Astrea was on a voyage from Odesa to Waterford, United Kingdom. |
| Columbus | United Kingdom | The ship was abandoned in the Atlantic Ocean. Her crew were rescued by the clipper John Land (United States). Columbus was on a voyage from Pensacola, Florida, United States to Dublin. |
| HMS Desperate | Royal Navy | The Conflict-class sloop ran aground at Devonport, Devon. Subsequently refloated, repaired and returned to service. |
| Eden | United Kingdom | The barque was driven ashore at "Eitzenloch". She was on a voyage from Hartlepool County Durham to Hamburg. She was later refloated and taken in to Cuxhaven. |
| Edith | United Kingdom | The schooner was run down and sunk in the North Sea off the coast of County Durham. Her crew were rescued. She was on a voyage from Seaton Sluice, County Durham to London. |
| Elizabeth Anderson | United Kingdom | The barque ran aground on The Shingles, off the Isle of Wight. She was on a voyage from Sunderland, County Durham to Malta. She was refloated and put in to Cowes, Isle of Wight, where she was struck by a wave and was severely damaged at her stern. |
| Jeune Marie | France | The lugger collided with Queen of the Ocean (United Kingdom) and sank in the English Channel off the coast of Devon, United Kingdom with the loss of two of her crew. Survivors were rescued by Queen of the Ocean. Jeune Marie was on a voyage from Sunderland to Saint-Nazaire, Loire-Inférieure. |
| Juniata | United States | The ship collided with Joseph Fish (United Kingdom) and sank 10 nautical miles (19 km) south east of the Tuskar Rock with loss of twelve of her 25 crew. Survivors were rescued by Joseph Fish. Juniata was on a voyage from Liverpool, Lancashire, United Kingdom to Key West, Florida. |
| Phœnix | United Kingdom | The barque was wrecked on the Alligator Reef. |
| Puebla | Hamburg | The ship ran aground in the Elbe. She was on a voyage from Liverpool to Hamburg. She wasrefloated. |
| Santo Cristo del Grao | Spain | The lateen-rigged ship was driven ashore and wrecked near Tarifa. Her crew survived. She was on a voyage from Algeciras to Cádiz. |

== 17 March ==
List of shipwrecks: 17 March 1861
| Ship | State | Description |
|---|---|---|
| C. S. Lochman | United States | The schooner was abandoned in the Atlantic Ocean. Her crew were rescued by the clipper John Land (United States) C. S. Lochman was on a voyage from a port in Louisiana to Baltimore, Maryland. |
| Elizabeth | United Kingdom | The ship ran aground on The Shingles, off the Isle of Wight. She was on a voyage from Sunderland, County Durham to Malta. She was refloated and put in to Cowes, Isle of Wight. |
| Emerald | United Kingdom | The Yorkshire Billyboy struck the pier at Ramsgate, Kent and was driven ashore. She was on a voyage from Ramsgate to Sandwich, Kent. She was refloated and taken in to Broadstairs, Kent in a severely leaky condition. |
| Hugh Charles | United Kingdom | The ship ran aground near Lamlash, Isle of Arran. She was on a voyage from the Strangford Lough to Troon, Ayrshire. |
| Jane | United Kingdom | The ship was wrecked at Largs, Ayrshire. |
| Milo | United Kingdom | The ship struck a sunken rock off the coast of Lothian. She was on a voyage from Newcastle upon Tyne, Northumberland to Fisherrow, Lothian. She put in to North Berwick, Lothian. |
| Ocean | United Kingdom | The ship struck a sunken rock off the coast of Lothian. She was on a voyage from South Shields, County Durham to Leith, Lothian. She put in to North Berwick. |
| J. R. Patullo | (United Kingdom of Great Britain and Ireland) British North America | The barque ran aground in the Clyde. She was on a voyage from Galway to Greenock, Renfrewshire. She was refloated with assistance from the tugs Flying Childers and Sir Isaac Newton (1). |

== 18 March ==
List of shipwrecks: 18 March 1861
| Ship | State | Description |
|---|---|---|
| Annabella | United Kingdom | The smack was driven into the schooner Isabella Johnstone (United Kingdom) and sank at Greenock, Renfrewshire. All on board were rescued by Isabella Johnstone. |
| Berthe Marie | France | The schooner was driven ashore and wrecked on Guernsey, Channel Islands. Her crew were rescued. She was on a voyage from Goole, Yorkshire, United Kingdom to Saint-Nazaire, Loire-Inférieure. |
| Bounding Billow | United Kingdom | The schooner collided with the barque Laura Russ (United States) and sank in the Atlantic Ocean. Her crew were rescued by Laura Russ. Bounding Billow was on a voyage from Yarmouth, Nova Scotia, British North America to New York, United States. |
| Friends | United Kingdom | The schooner was driven ashore at Scotstown Head, Aberdeenshire. Her crew were rescued. She was on a voyage from the Firth of Forth to Peterhead, Aberdeenshire. |
| Ida | United Kingdom | The barque was driven ashore at Cape Henry, Virginia. She was on a voyage from Messina, Sicily to Baltimore, Maryland or New York. She broke up on 21 March. |
| Jessie Ann | United Kingdom | The schooner was driven ashore at Campbeltown, Argyllshire. She was on a voyage from Ayr to Dublin. She was refloated on 25 March but again drove ashore. |
| Juste | France | The ship ran aground at Saint-Nazaire, Loire-Inférieure. She was on a voyage from Réunion to Saint-Nazaire. She was refloated on 20 March and taken in to Saint-Nazaire. |
| Lively | United Kingdom | The schooner was driven ashore at Campbeltown. She was on a voyage from Leven, Fife to Larne, County Antrim. She was refloated on 25 March and taken in to Campbeltown. |
| Lucy | (United Kingdom of Great Britain and Ireland) Guernsey | The schooner was run down and sunk in the North Sea off Spurn Point, Yorkshire by the steamship Secret (United Kingdom). Her crew were rescued by Secret. Lucy was on a voyage from London to South Shields, County Durham. |
| Morayshire | United Kingdom | The schooner was driven ashore at Nairn. She was on a voyage from Sunderland, County Durham to Inverness. |
| Renovation | United Kingdom | The snow foundered off Beachy Head, Sussex. Her ten crew survived. She was on a voyage from North Shields, County Durham to Gibraltar. The captain and mate were charged with barratry over the loss of the vessel. |
| Seahorse | United Kingdom | The steamship ran aground on the West Platt, off the coast of South Holland, Netherlands. She was on a voyage from Hull, Yorkshire to Rotterdam, South Holland. She was refloated and resumed her voyage. |
| T. E. Millidge | United Kingdom | The barque struck a sunken rock off the Eilean Glas Lighthouse and broke her back. She was on a voyage from Hamburg to Liverpool. |
| Venture | United Kingdom | The schooner sank in the North Sea off Great Yarmouth, Norfolk. Her crew were rescued. she was on a voyage from Poole, Dorset to Newcastle upon Tyne, Northumberland. The wreck was refloated on 12 June and beached at Sea Palling, Norfolk. |

== 19 March ==
List of shipwrecks: 19 March 1861
| Ship | State | Description |
|---|---|---|
| Award | United Kingdom | While on her second voyage and bound from Liverpool, Lancashire, for New Orleans, Louisiana, Confederate States of America, the 846-ton sailing ship struck rocks 1.5 miles (2.4 km) off Gweal, Isles of Scilly. North-northwesterly force 8 to 9 winds drove her onto the northern end of Gweal, pushing her bow onto land and forming a temporary bridge to the island. After 12 hours the crew of 24 managed to scramble ashore. |
| Eden | United Kingdom | The barque foundered in the Bay of Biscay. All on board were rescued by the brig Alf (Norway). Eden was on a voyage from Alexandria, Egypt to London. |
| James | United Kingdom | The brig was driven ashore and wrecked at Lampaul, Finistère, France. Her crew were rescued. She was on a voyage from Trieste to Falmouth, Cornwall. She was refloated in early March and towed in to Portsall, Finistère. |
| Julia Deagle | (United Kingdom of Great Britain and Ireland) British North America | The ship foundered off Foad's Cove, Newfoundland. |
| Margaret Pryde | United Kingdom | The ship was driven ashore and wrecked on Heligoland. Her crew were rescued. She was on a voyage from Newcastle upon Tyne, Northumberland to Hamburg. |
| Maria | United Kingdom | The schooner collided with Pioneer (United Kingdom) and sank off the Dungeness Lighthouse, Kent. Her crew were rescued by Pioneer. Maria was on a voyage from Sunderland, County Durham to Lymington, Hampshire. |
| Venture | United Kingdom | The schooner was abandoned off Great Yarmouth, Norfolk. Her crew were rescued by the brig Zion (United Kingdom. Venture subsequently foundered. |

== 20 March ==
List of shipwrecks: 20 March 1861
| Ship | State | Description |
|---|---|---|
| Hertha | Norway | The barque was wrecked on the Kentish Knock. Her crew were rescued by the schooner Julia (United Kingdom). Hertha was on a voyage from South Shields, County Durham, United Kingdom to Naples, Italy. |
| Orissa | United Kingdom | The ship struck a sunken rock and foundered east of Sicily with the loss of a crew member. She was on a voyage from the River Tyne to Alexandria, Egypt. |
| Renovato | United Kingdom | The schooner ran aground on the Newcombe Sand, in the North Sea off the coast of Suffolk. She was on a voyage from Newcastle upon Tyne, Northumberland to London. She was refloated and resumed her voyage. |

== 21 March ==
List of shipwrecks: 21 March 1861
| Ship | State | Description |
|---|---|---|
| D. P. Gale | United States | The schooner was driven out of the harbor of Gloucester, Massachusetts in a severe gale and went ashore at Old House Cove, a total loss. |
| Idala | United Kingdom | The brig was driven ashore on Holy Isle, in the Firth of Clyde. She was on a voyage from Glasgow, Renfrewshire to Havre de Grâce, Seine-Inférieure, France. She was refloated the next day and taken in to Ardrossan, Ayrshire in a severely damaged condition. |
| Irana Kroosta, Joana Krooata,Joano Kroster; Kroosta, or Nana Krosasta | Flag unknown | The brig foundered. Her crew were rescued by the brig Robert Wing United States). She was on a voyage from Newcastle upon Tyne, Northumberland, United Kingdom to New York. |
| Mary D. Babson | United States | The schooner was driven out of the harbor of Gloucester, Massachusetts in a severe gale and went ashore at Old House Cove, a total loss. |
| True Briton | United Kingdom | The brig ran aground on the Hebburn Shoal, in the River Tyne and was damaged. She was refloated and put in to South Shields, County Durham in a leaky condition. |
| William Nielson | Denmark | The ship was driven ashore on Læsø. |

== 22 March ==
List of shipwrecks: 22 March 1861
| Ship | State | Description |
|---|---|---|
| Connaught | United Kingdom | The steamship ran aground on the Clipera Rock, off the coast of Anglesey. She was on a voyage from Kingstown, County Dublin to Holyhead, Anglesey. She was refloated the next day. |
| Cornet | United Kingdom | The ship ran aground on the Brake Sand. She was on a voyage from South Shields, County Durham to Cartagena, Spain. She was refloated and towed in to Ramsgate, Kent. |
| Earl Gray | United Kingdom | The schooner capsized at Ouistreham, Calvados, France. |
| Euphrates | United Kingdom | The ship ran aground on the Newcombe Sand, in the North Sea off the coast of Suffolk. She was on a voyage from Sunderland, County Durham to London. She was refloated. |
| Forsoget | Norway | The vessel was driven ashore and damaged at Peterhead, Aberdeenshire, United Kingdom. She was on a voyage from Kragerø to Peterhead. She was refloated and taken in to Peterhead. |
| Harvest Queen | United Kingdom | The barque was wrecked at Scituate, Massachusetts with the loss of eight of her crew. She was on a voyage from Buenos Aires, Argentina to Boston, Massachusetts. |

== 23 March ==
List of shipwrecks: 23 March 1861
| Ship | State | Description |
|---|---|---|
| Aghios Demetrios | Greece | The brig struck the North Bishop Rock and was abandoned by eight of the twelve people on board. She was on a voyage from the Black Sea to Inveraray, Argyllshire, United Kingdom. Aghios Demetrios drifted in to Whitesand Bay in a sinking condition. She was taken in tow by the steamship Trinity (United Kingdom) and towed in to Solva, Pembrokeshire, United Kingdom. |
| Mary and Kate | United Kingdom | The brig ran aground on The Shingles, off the Isle of Wight. |
| Seejungfer | Prussia | The barque collided with the steamship Amérique or Cydnus (both France) and sank near Gallipoli, Ottoman Empire. Her crew were rescued. She was on a voyage from Odesa to an English port. |

== 25 March ==
List of shipwrecks: 25 March 1861
| Ship | State | Description |
|---|---|---|
| Augustus | United Kingdom | The barque foundered in the Indian Ocean. Her crew were rescued by Diana (United Kingdom). Augustus was on a voyage from Cardiff, Glamorgan to Manila, Spanish East Indies. |

== 26 March ==
List of shipwrecks: 26 March 1861
| Ship | State | Description |
|---|---|---|
| Ben Johnson | United Kingdom | The schooner ran aground on the wreck of Helen (United Kingdom) at Kingstown, County Dublin. She was on a voyage from Liverpool, Lancashire to Kingstown. She was refloated. |
| Johannes | Prussia | The ship was wrecked off Sanday, Orkney Islands, United Kingdom. All on board, more than 140 people, were rescued. She was on a voyage from Bremen to Baltimore, Maryland, United States. |
| Maria | United Kingdom | The ship was abandoned at sea in a sinking condition. Her crew were rescued by the galiot Tyeemeum (Netherlands). Maria was on a voyage from Berdyansk, Russia to Queenstown, County Cork. She was subsequently discovered by Oregon (United Kingdom), which put four crew on board. They took her in to Cádiz, Spain in a leaky condition. |
| Mathilde | Belgium | The barque ran aground on the Goodwin Sands, Kent, United Kingdom. She was on a voyage from Ostend, West Flanders to Cádiz, Spain. She was refloated and resumed her voyage. |

== 27 March ==
List of shipwrecks: 27 March 1861
| Ship | State | Description |
|---|---|---|
| Albatros | United Kingdom | The ship was wrecked in the Pescadores Islands. Her crew were rescued. She was on a voyage from Amoy, to Ningpo, China. |
| Bella Carmen | Spain | The ship was wrecked in How-e-too Bay. Her crew were rescued. She was on a voyage from Manila, Spanish East Indies to Amoy. |
| Bonne Aimée | France | The ship was driven ashore at "Point Sablons". She was on a voyage from an English port to Marseille, Bouches-du-Rhône. |
| Canrobert | United Kingdom | The ship ran aground on the English Bank, in the River Plate. She was refloated on 29 March with assistance from HMS Curacoa (Royal Navy) and taken in to Montevideo, Uruguay. |
| Hortensia | Kingdom of Hanover | The schooner was wrecked on the North Steel Rocks, on the coast of Northumberland, United Kingdom with the loss of her captain. Four survivors were rescued by the Boulmer Lifeboat. |
| Lecompte | Confederate States of America | The 238-ton sidewheel paddle steamer was burned at Mobile, Alabama. |
| Pandora | Greece | The brig was wrecked 40 nautical miles (74 km) from Tunis, Beylik of Tunis. She was on a voyage from Varna, Ottoman Empire to Queenstown, County Cork or Falmouth, Cornwall, United Kingdom. |
| Wellington | United Kingdom | The sloop was driven ashore and wrecked at Staithes, Yorkshire. |

== 28 March ==
List of shipwrecks: 28 March 1861
| Ship | State | Description |
|---|---|---|
| Cambria | United Kingdom | The ship was driven ashore and damaged at Berry Head, Devon. She was on a voyage from Exmouth, Devon to Neath, Glamorgan. She was refloated and put back to Exmouth. |
| Delna | Kingdom of Hanover | The schooner foundered in the Atlantic Ocean. Her crew were rescued by Ernte (United Kingdom). Denia was on a voyage from Pomarão, Portugal to Liverpool, Lancashire, United Kingdom. |
| Jacob A. Westerweldt | Flag unknown | The ship ran aground at Sunderland, County Durham, United Kingdom and drove her anchor through her hull. |
| Julie and Maria | Prussia | The ship was driven ashore and wrecked on Whitburn Steel, County Durham, United Kingdom. Her crew were rescued by a tug. She was on a voyage from Wolgast to Newcastle upon Tyne, Northumberland, United Kingdom. |
| Perseverance | United Kingdom | The ship ran aground off Kessingland, Suffolk. She was on a voyage from Marseille, Bouches-du-Rhône, France to Great Yarmouth, Norfolk. She was refloated and completed her voyage. |
| Telegraph | United Kingdom | The ship was run ashore at Wicklow. She was on a voyage from Saint John, New Brunswick, British North America to Briton Ferry, Glamorgan. |

== 29 March ==
List of shipwrecks: 29 March 1861
| Ship | State | Description |
|---|---|---|
| Minerva | Norway | The barque ran aground on the Goodwin Sands, Kent, United Kingdom. She was on a voyage from Skien to Hull, Yorkshire, United Kingdom. |
| Wollin | Danzig | The ship was driven ashore at Cimbritshamn, Sweden. She was on a voyage from Danzig to Holyhead, Anglesey, United Kingdom. She subsequently became a wreck. |

== 30 March ==
List of shipwrecks: 30 March 1861
| Ship | State | Description |
|---|---|---|
| Johannes | Bremen | The ship was driven ashore and wrecked in Newark Bay, Orkney Islands, United Kingdom. Her crew survived. |
| Olive Branch | United Kingdom | The brigantine collided with the steamship Arcturus and was run ashore in the Victoria Channel. She was on a voyage from Maryport, Cumberland to Belfast, County Antrim. |

== 31 March ==
List of shipwrecks: 31 March 1861
| Ship | State | Description |
|---|---|---|
| Arche | (Denmark) | The schooner was wrecked on the Holm Sand, in the North Sea off the coast of Suffolk, United Kingdom. Her crew were rescued. She was on a voyage from Glückstadt to London, United Kingdom. |
| Norna | United Kingdom | The barque was wrecked on a reef off "St, Augustin" (approximately 7°N 156°E). Her crew survived. She was on a voyage from Newcastle, New South Wales to London. |

== Unknown date ==
List of shipwrecks: Unknown date in March 1861
| Ship | State | Description |
|---|---|---|
| Adler | Rostock | The brig was driven ashore and severely damaged in the Dardanelles before 21 March. She was later refloated and taken in to Constantinople, Ottoman Empire. |
| Ann | United Kingdom | The ship was driven ashore near Ballywalter, County Down. She was on a voyage from Troon, Ayrshire to Dublin. She was refloated on 26 March and take in to Belfast, County Antrim. |
| Ape del Nord | Kingdom of Sardinia | The brig was driven ashore and wrecked at "Barbiers" on 10, 15 or 17 March. |
| Belle Elise | France | The schooner was wrecked between Cape Breton and "Torgnosse" before 18 March. |
| Carisbad | Sweden | The barque was wrecked on Mauritius before 6 March. Her crew were rescued. |
| Catharina | Netherlands | The ship was driven ashore by ice in the Danube before 18 March. She was severely damaged. |
| Diplomat | Greece | The brig was wrecked at Tenedos, Ottoman Empire on 10, 15 or 17 March. She was on a voyage from "Coadvalonea" to Constantinople, Ottoman Empire. |
| Eden | United Kingdom | The ship foundered in The Downs. |
| Emanuel | Grand Duchy of Oldenburg | The galiot foundered in the North Sea. Her crew were rescued. |
| Frey Canellas | Spain | The barque foundered in the Atlantic Ocean. Her crew were rescued. She was on a voyage from Matanzas, Cuba to Liverpool, Lancashire, United Kingdom. |
| Georges | Greece | The brig was wrecked at "Bergas", Ottoman Empire on 10, 15 or 17 March. She was on a voyage from Malta to Constantinople. |
| Halo | United Kingdom | The ship was driven ashore near Drigg, Cumberland. She was on a voyage from Dublin to Maryport, Cumberland. |
| Hannah Eastee | United States | The ship was driven ashore at Plymouth, Massachusetts. She was on a voyage from Plymouth to Dublin. She was refloated on 24 March. |
| H. C. Bowden | United Kingdom | The ship was driven ashore on Holy Isle, in the Firth of Clyde before 26 March. She was refloated. |
| Hebe | United Kingdom | The ship capsized at King's Lynn, Norfolk and was severely damaged. |
| Hector | United Kingdom | The barque ran aground at the mouth of the Rio Grande. She was on a voyage from Bordeaux, Gironde, France to the Rio Grande. She was consequently condemned. |
| Ingolf | Norway | The schooner was driven ashore and wrecked at "Barbiers" on 10, 15 or 17 March. |
| Jim Crow | United Kingdom | The ship ran aground and was wrecked at Rabat, Morocco. Her crew were rescued. She was on a voyage from Rabat to Great Yarmouth, Norfolk. Also reported as running aground and sinking at Great Yarmouth. |
| Kennett Kingsford | United Kingdom | The ship was driven ashore and damaged at Tarifa, Spain before 3 March. |
| Mariana | France | The brig ran aground on the Longsand, in the North Sea off the coast of Essex, United Kingdom. She was refloated with the assistance of the smacks Celerity and Volunteer and a lugger (all United Kingdom). |
| Marika | Sweden | The ship was wrecked on Colonsay, Orkney Islands, United Kingdom. She was on a voyage from Greenock, Renfrewshire, United Kingdom to Gothenburg. |
| Mars | United Kingdom | The brig was driven ashore near "Ottendorf". She was refloated with assistance from the steamship Assecuradeur (Flag unknown) and taken in to Hamburg, where she arrived on 28 March. |
| Mary Kingsland | Confederate States of America | The yacht was wrecked on the coast of Florida. |
| Minstrel Boy | Norway | The ran aground in The Downs. She was on a voyage from South Shields, County Durham, United Kingdom to Cádiz, Spain. She was refloated and put in to Ramsgate, Kent, United Kingdom in a severely leaky condition. |
| Nascomento Feliz | Portugal | The ship was driven ashore at Padstow, Cornwall, United Kingdom. She was of a voyage from Cork, United Kingdom to Lisbon. She was refloated on 14 March and taken in to Padstow. |
| Notre Dame de Scapulaire | France | The ship was driven ashore at Troy, Ottoman Empire. She was on a voyage from Enos, Ottoman Empire to Marseille, Bouches-du-Rhône. She was refloated with assistance from a steamship and towed in to the Dardanelles for repairs. |
| Olivia | United Kingdom | The brigantine was driven ashore in the Danube near Reni, United Principalities between 4 and 9 March. |
| Peace, or Peru | United Kingdom | The ship foundered off Lagos, Portugal before 2 March. Her crew were rescued by the brig Harriet (United Kingdom). The ship was on a voyage from Huelva, Spain to Liverpool. |
| Peter Johansen | Denmark | The schooner foundered off Anholt. |
| Quatre Frères | United Kingdom | The lugger was driven ashore near Dunkirk, Nord. She was refloated and taken in to Havre de Grâce, Seine-Inférieure, where she arrived on 17 March. |
| Queen Victoria | United Kingdom | The steamship was driven ashore at Cremyll, Cornwall. She was refloated on 13 March with assistance from the tugs Confiance (United Kingdom), Princess, Queen and Wellington (all United Kingdom) and taken in to Plymouth Devon. |
| Rika | Netherlands | The galiot was abandoned off Cape St Vincent, Portugal. She was on a voyage from Huelva, Spain to Newcastle upon Tyne, Northumberland, United Kingdom. |
| Rimac | France | The ship was driven ashore at Saint Gilles before 9 March. She was on a voyage from Bordeaux, Gironde to Lima, Peru. She was refloated on 10 March and taken in to Saint Gilles. |
| Roderick Dhu | United Kingdom | The ship was wrecked 7 nautical miles (13 km) south of Cape Palmas, Liberia. Her crew were rescued, but the vessel was plundered by the local inhabitants. She was on a voyage from Liverpool to Old Calabar. |
| Rubenow | Prussia | The barque was driven ashore in the Dardanelles. She was refloated on 20 March. |
| Saint Spiridor | Greece | The brig was wrecked at "Barbiers", Ottoman Empire on 10, 15 or 17 March. She was on a voyage from Patras to Constantinople. |
| Securité | France | The ship was driven ashore near Rabat. Her crew were rescued. She was on a voyage from Tangier to Casablanca, Morocco. |
| Sindbad | France | The full-rigged ship ran aground in the Hooghly River. She was on a voyage from Calcutta, India to Havre de Grâce, Seine-Inférieure. She was refloated and resumed her voyage. |
| St. Cloud | United States | The schooner was lost on Cape Cod. Crew saved. |
| Wilhemina Maira | Hamburg | The ship foundered. She was on a voyage from Iquique, Chile to Hamburg. |
| William Cargill | United Kingdom | The paddle tug was holed by an anchor and sank in the River Tyne. |
