= USS Renshaw (DD-499) =

Fletcher-class destroyer

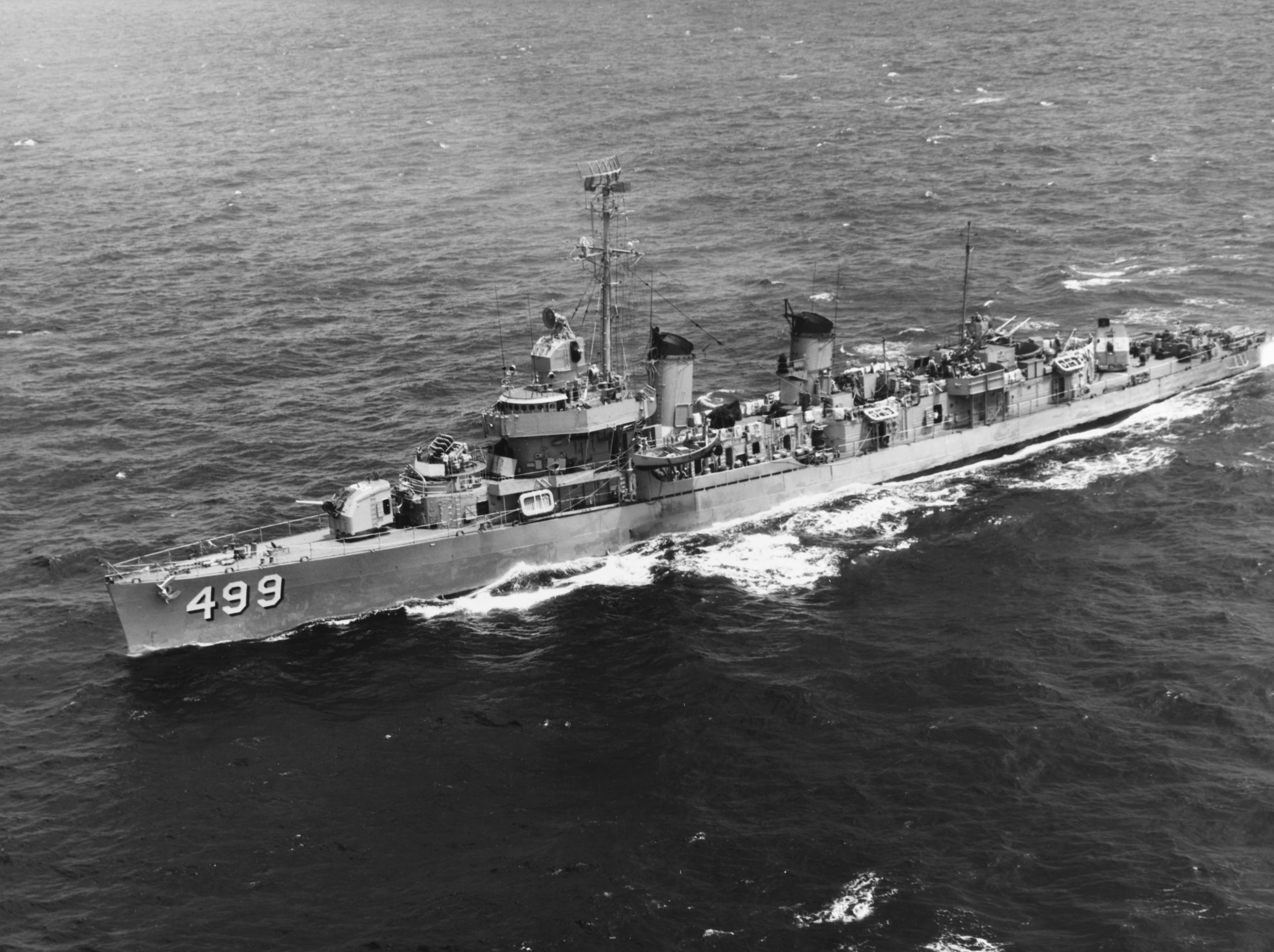
- USS Renshaw (DDE-499), while operating in Korean waters, 27 July 1951.

History

United States
- Namesake: William B. Renshaw
- Builder: Federal Shipbuilding and Drydock Company, Kearny, New Jersey
- Laid down: 7 May 1942
- Launched: 13 October 1942
- Commissioned: 5 December 1942
- Decommissioned: 14 February 1970
- Stricken: 14 February 1970
- Fate: Sold for scrap, October 1970

General characteristics
- Class & type: Fletcher-class destroyer
- Displacement: 2,050 tons
- Length: 376 ft 6 in (114.7 m)
- Beam: 39 ft 8 in (12.1 m)
- Draft: 17 ft 9 in (5.4 m)
- Propulsion: 60,000 shp (45 MW); 2 propellers
- Speed: 35 knots (65 km/h; 40 mph)
- Range: 6,500 nmi. (12,000 km) at 15 kt
- Complement: 336
- Armament: 5 × single Mk 12 5 in (127 mm)/38 guns; 5 × twin 40 mm (1.6 in) Bofors AA guns; 7 × single 20 mm (0.8 in) Oerlikon AA guns; 2 × quintuple 21 in (533 mm) torpedo tubes; 6 × single depth charge throwers; 2 × depth charge racks

USS Renshaw (DD/DDE-499), a Fletcher-class destroyer, was the third ship of the United States Navy of that name, in honor of Commander William B. Renshaw.

Renshaw was laid down 7 May 1942 by the Federal Shipbuilding & Drydock Company in Kearny, New Jersey; launched on 13 October 1942, sponsored by Miss Dorothy Lillian Renshaw; and commissioned on 5 December 1942.

== South Pacific, 1943–1944 ==
Following shakedown, Renshaw reported to the Pacific Fleet in the spring of 1943, and protected transports in the Solomon Islands area. On 2 July 1943, she participated in the bombardment of the Vila Stanmore and Shortland Island areas in Kula Gulf, coming under the fire of enemy shore batteries.

From 21 to 25 November, she pounded East Island in Empress Augusta Bay with 200 rounds of 5 inch ammunition. Sorum and Makatawa on northeast Bougainville next felt her blows, and she then proceeded north of Buka Island for an offensive sweep between Buka and Green Islands. On the morning of 20 January, she retired southward with her task unit to give fire support to the landings on Bougainville Island itself.

During landings in the New Britain-New Ireland area, Renshaw dealt considerable damage to enemy airfield installations while coming under the fire of shore batteries. On 13 March the ship was in the Empress Augusta Bay area where she bombarded enemy positions in the jungles east of the beachhead held by Allied forces.

After a short period of amphibious training at Pearl Harbor, Renshaw led a force of LSTs to the Marianas Islands. At first assigned to the outer destroyer screen, she later closed the Tinian beach to provide star shell illumination and fire support for troops ashore who were undergoing a heavy counterattack.

== Philippines, 1944–1945 ==
In November 1944, while operating with a destroyer division bombarding enemy installations in the Ormoc Bay area and conducting anti-shipping sweeps in the waters westward of Leyte, Renshaw spotted Japanese submarine I-46 on the surface. Renshaw and accompanying destroyers Saufley, Waller, and Pringle immediately commenced fire and, after a brief one-sided duel during which the submarine returned fire with small caliber weapons, the enemy vessel was destroyed.

After a turnaround in San Pedro Bay, Renshaw and other units of her task group made a high-speed run to Ormoc Bay in an effort to intercept enemy transports reported unloading there. However, only a single Japanese vessel, a large wooden barge, was found, which Renshaw took under fire and destroyed while she came under air attack.

On 31 December 1944, Renshaw sortied with a task unit en route to screen a large transport formation assigned to land troops in the Lingayen Gulf area on 9 January 1945. Despite repeated air attacks during the voyage through the Sulu and South China Seas, the powerful invasion armada reached its objective without serious damage.

While in the Mindanao Sea, on 21 February 1945, Renshaw was struck by a torpedo from an enemy submarine, about 10 feet (3 m) below the waterline, flooding the firerooms. The ship lost all power, a large section of the hull was warped by the explosion, and bulkheads and decks were fractured. Even though 19 men were killed and 20 injured, within a matter of minutes, damage control parties had the flooding reduced by half. Through their efforts the main propulsion machinery suffered no damage. She managed to get under way again, and was escorted to San Pedro Bay by Rudderow.

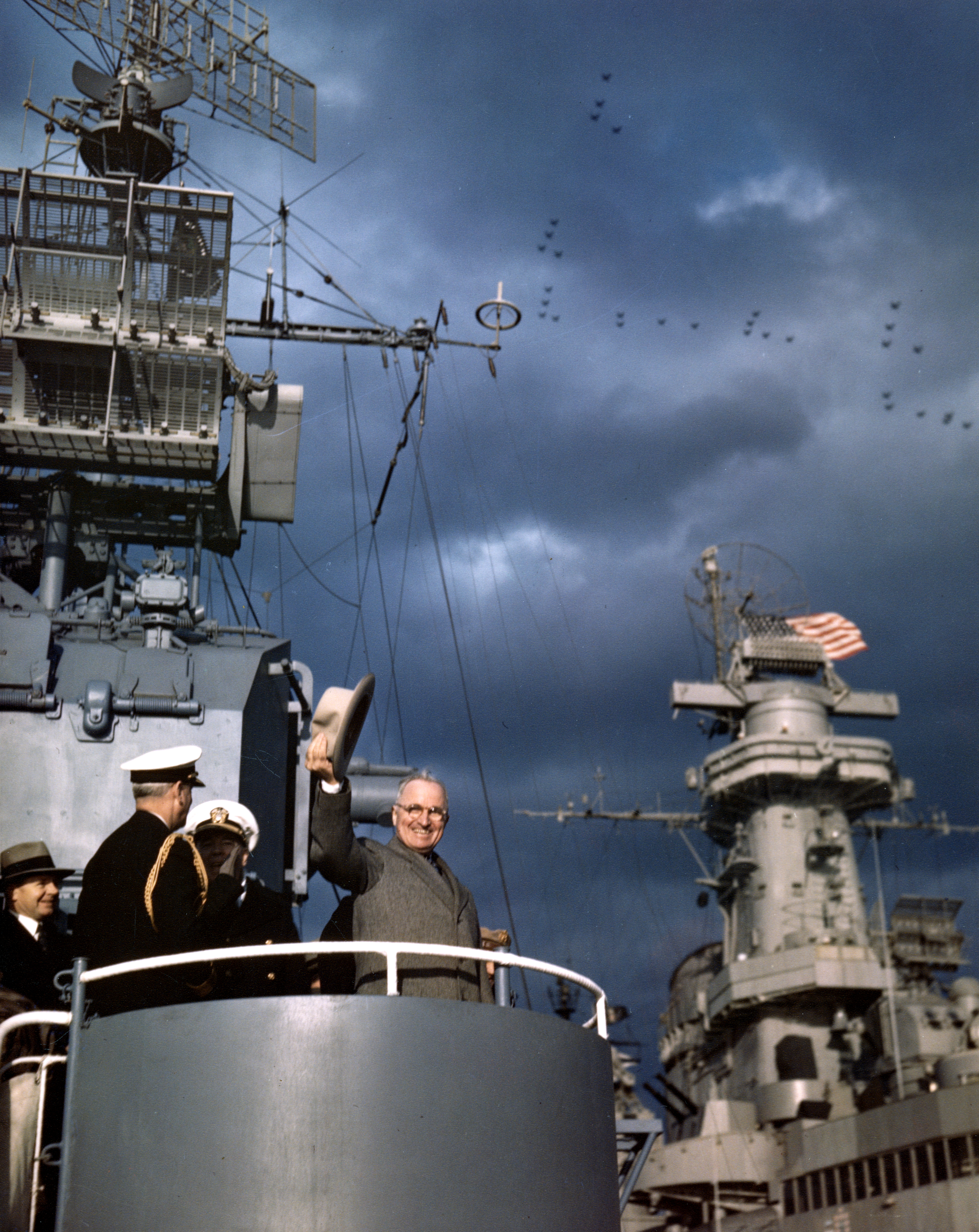
President Harry S. Truman (waving his hat) with his party on board USS Renshaw during the Navy Day Fleet Review in New York Harbor, 27 October 1945.

Temporary repairs were made in April by the ship's crew and men from the destroyer tender Whitney and the repair ship Prometheus. Renshaw then proceeded under her own power from the forward area to the Todd Pacific Shipyard in Tacoma, Washington, where permanent repairs were completed early in October 1945.

On Navy Day, 27 October 1945, in New York Harbor, President Harry S. Truman reviewed the greatest victory parade in naval history from Renshaw.

== 1949–1970 ==
Renshaw decommissioned in February 1947 and was attached to the U.S. Atlantic Reserve Fleet. During 1949 and 1950, she was converted to a specialized antisubmarine vessel and recommissioned in June 1950 as DDE-499.

During the Korean War, Renshaw had two tours of duty in the Far East, May to November 1951 and November 1952 to June 1953, in which she served as an escort, patrol, search and rescue, and bombardment vessel. Subsequently, Renshaw served in the Pacific Proving Grounds, February to May 1954, during Operation Castle, rendering patrol and air control services for Joint Task Force 7.

This was followed by a short tour in the Far East from June to August 1954 where Renshaw rescued a British airman from the sea while acting as plane guard for the Royal Navy carrier HMS Warrior, and also participated in a hunter-killer exercise with a force composed of United States and Canadian ships. On 8 August 1955, Renshaw sailed for her fourth tour in the Far East, spending most of her time in hunter-killer exercises and task force operations. She subsequently made additional Far Eastern deployments from Pearl Harbor, October 1956 to May 1957, December 1957 to May 1958, February 1959 to July 1959, and April 1960 to October 1960.

In 1960, Renshaw received Weapon Alpha, a new anti-submarine weapon, and on 17 December 1961, recovered the nosecone of Discoverer 36. She made a further WestPac deployment in 1962. On 7 August 1962 she was redesignated a destroyer and resumed the hull number, DD-499. On 3 October, Renshaw participated in the recovery of Project Mercury astronaut Commander Walter M. Schirra. Spending most of 1963 operating out of Pearl Harbor, Renshaw deployed to WestPac again in November 1963, returning 6 months later.

In 1964 Renshaw took part in the movie In Harm's Way.

On 3 March 1965, Renshaw, in company with other units of Destroyer Division 252, departed Pearl Harbor on short notice to augment destroyer forces for the rapidly expanding naval commitments in the South China Sea. During April and May, she served in surveillance roles and in support of carrier striking force operations. In June she was on Taiwan patrol, returning to Vietnamese waters in July, where she remained until September before steaming via Japan for Pearl Harbor.

In October and December Renshaw served as an alternate recovery ship in Project Gemini. Her 11th WestPac tour began 5 July 1966. She participated in anti-submarine operations, as an aircraft carrier rescue destroyer, in special operations with Chicago in the Tonkin Gulf, and in special operations and patrol duties in the Taiwan Strait. DesDiv 252 returned to Pearl Harbor 16 December 1966.

Renshaw remained in the Hawaiian area throughout 1967. She departed Pearl Harbor 8 April 1968 for WestPac where she provided escort services for the fast carrier attack forces on Yankee Station in the Tonkin Gulf. In September Renshaw returned to Pearl Harbor. In June 1969 she sailed for WestPac and Yankee Station where she rescued one pilot from the water. In December 1969, she returned from the Far East to Pearl Harbor. Renshaw decommissioned on 14 February 1970 and was struck from the Navy List the same day. She was sold for scrapping in October 1970 to Zidell Explorations, Inc.

Renshaw earned eight battle stars for World War II service; five battle stars for Korean War service; and six battle stars for Vietnam War service. Her Ship's Bell survives, and is at the Portsmouth Naval Shipyard Museum.

== See also ==
See USS Renshaw for other ships of the same name.
