= CSS General Rusk =

History

Confederate States
- Name: General Rusk
- Fate: Destroyed by fire after attempts to refloat the ship failed

General characteristics
- Type: Paddle steamer
- Displacement: 750 t.
- Length: 200 ft (61 m)
- Beam: 31 ft (9.4 m)
- Draft: 5 ft 7 in (1.70 m)
- Depth of hold: 12 ft (3.7 m)
- Propulsion: Steam

CSS General Rusk, built as a merchantman at Wilmington, Del., in 1857, was seized from the Southern Steamship Co., by the State of Texas at Galveston in 1861. She served as reconnaissance and signal boat with the Texas Marine Department in and about the waters of Galveston Harbor during the latter half of 1861, trying unsuccessfully on several occasions to slip past the Federal blockade. In early November 1861 she rendered aid to CS Royal Yacht following that vessel's capture and firing by Union forces from USS Santee, and managed to save her from complete destruction and tow her to safety. In December 1861 she was ordered to take part in the defense of Buffalo Bayou, San Jacinto River.

Her most memorable exploit was the capture on 17 April 1861 off Indianola, Tex., of SS Star of the West, the first Union transport to make news in the Civil War.

In early 1862, General Rusk was placed by General Hebert, commanding Texas Marine Department, under the control of Maj. T. S. Moise, Assistant Quartermaster, who colluded to transfer the steamer to his associates, authorizing them to place her under the British flag and employ her in blockade running. After a single successful round-trip there under the name Blanche, she was bound for Havana in October 1862 when pursued by USS Montgomery, Comdr. C. Hunter, USN. While attempting to escape the steamer was run aground near Marianao, Cuba, and seized by a Montgomery boat crew. Efforts to get her towed off the bar and underway again ended when fire broke out and consumed both ship and cargo. The incident occasioned strong protest from England under whose flag she sailed, and Spain in whose territorial waters she was captured.
