= USS Renshaw (DD-176) =

Wickes-class destroyer

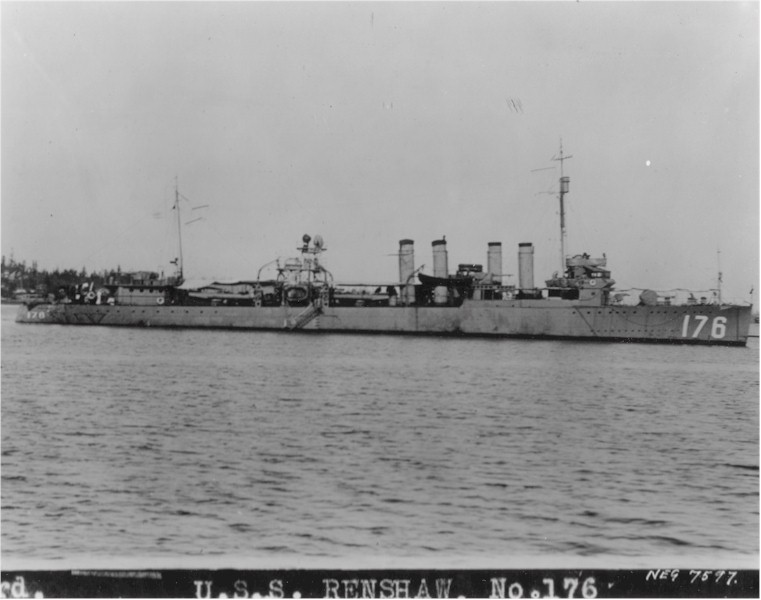

History

United States
- Namesake: William B. Renshaw
- Builder: Union Iron Works, San Francisco, California
- Laid down: 8 May 1918
- Launched: 21 September 1918
- Commissioned: 31 July 1919
- Decommissioned: 27 May 1922
- Stricken: 19 May 1936
- Fate: Sold for scrapping, 29 September 1936

General characteristics
- Class & type: Wickes-class destroyer
- Displacement: 1,284 tons
- Length: 314 ft 4 in (95.81 m)
- Beam: 30 ft 11 in (9.42 m)
- Draft: 9 ft 10 in (3.00 m)
- Speed: 35 knots (65 km/h; 40 mph)
- Complement: 122 officers and enlisted
- Armament: 4 × 4 in (102 mm) guns; 1 × 3 in (76 mm) gun; 4 × 21 inch (533 mm) tt.

The second USS Renshaw (DD–176) was a Wickes-class destroyer in the United States Navy following World War I . She was named for William B. Renshaw.

== History ==
Renshaw was laid down 8 May 1918 by the Union Iron Works, San Francisco, California; launched 21 September 1918; sponsored by Mrs. Frank Johnson; and commissioned 31 July 1919.

Renshaw was assigned to the Destroyer Force, Pacific Fleet. She joined the Fleet in Monterey Bay, and passed in review for the Secretary of the Navy who observed the Fleet from USS Oregon (BB-3). Renshaw departed San Francisco 16 September for her base of operations, San Diego, where she arrived on the 20th. Her brief service was none too active, since small appropriations limited most units of the Fleet to routine target practice and engineering competition. The destroyer participated in exercises off the California coast, performed patrol and dispatch duty, transported prisoners, and made one training cruise with naval reservists out of Portland, Oregon.

Renshaw cruised to Hawaii from 25 March to 28 April 1920, with Destroyer Flotilla 11, to conduct a thorough reconnaissance of the islands with a view toward establishing an operating base for the Fleet. During the period from 16 December 1920 to 4 April 1921, the ship was at the Puget Sound Navy Yard for overhaul, returning to base on 8 April to rejoin the Destroyer Force.

In January 1922 Renshaw calibrated radio compasses for the 12th Naval District. She returned to San Diego 28 January and remained moored, except for a brief trip to San Pedro 20–24 February, until decommissioned 27 May 1922. The destroyer was laid up at San Diego until disposed of in 1936 in accordance with the London Naval Treaty for the limitation and reduction of naval armament. She was struck from the Navy list 19 May 1936, sold 29 September to Schiavone Bonomo Corporation, and reduced to a hulk 2 December 1936.
