= USS Renshaw =

USS Renshaw may refer to the following ships of the United States Navy:

- USS Renshaw (1862), a schooner, captured in 1862 and sold in 1865.
- USS Renshaw (DD-176), a Wickes-class destroyer, launched in 1918 and struck in 1936.
- USS Renshaw (DD-499), a Fletcher-class destroyer, launched in 1942 and struck in 1970.
