= USS Renshaw (1862) =

United States Navy schooner

History

United States
- Name: USS Renshaw
- Acquired: by capture, 10 May 1862
- Fate: Sold, 12 August 1865

General characteristics
- Type: Schooner
- Displacement: 75 long tons (76 t)
- Length: 68 ft (21 m)
- Beam: 20 ft (6.1 m)
- Draft: 6 ft 6 in (1.98 m)
- Depth of hold: 5 ft 4 in (1.63 m)

The first USS Renshaw was a schooner in the United States Navy during the American Civil War.

Renshaw, a new schooner still unrigged, was captured by a boatcrew from USS Louisiana in the Tar River some 5 miles above Washington, North Carolina, on 20 May 1862. The members of the expedition named the prize, taken without papers, for Louisiana's commanding officer, Comdr. Richard T. Renshaw. R. T. Renshaw, soon renamed Renshaw so that she might also honor his brother, the late Comdr. William B. Renshaw, was placed in service as an ordnance hulk and formally purchased by the Navy from the Boston Prize Court on 28 October 1862.

She served in the North Atlantic Blockading Squadron through the remainder of the Civil War and was sold at Norfolk, Virginia on 12 August 1865.

== See also ==
- Blockade runners of the American Civil War
- Blockade mail of the Confederacy
- Union Navy
