= William Renshaw (disambiguation) =

William Renshaw (1861–1904) was a British tennis player.

William Renshaw may also refer to:

- William B. Renshaw (1816–1863), officer in the United States Navy during the American Civil War
- William Robert Renshaw (1845–1923), English industrialist
