= USS William G. Anderson =

Gunboat of the United States Navy

History

United States
- Launched: 1859
- Acquired: 23 August 1861
- Commissioned: 2 October 1861
- Decommissioned: 21 July 1866
- Stricken: 1866 (est.)
- Fate: Sold, 28 August 1866

General characteristics
- Tonnage: 593
- Length: 149 ft 7 in (45.59 m)
- Beam: 30 ft 1 in (9.17 m)
- Depth of hold: 14 ft 3 in (4.34 m)
- Propulsion: sail
- Armament: six 32-pounder guns; one 24-pounder howitzer

USS William G. Anderson was a barque used by the Union Navy during the American Civil War. She was assigned by the Navy to patrol navigable waterways of the Confederacy to prevent the South from trading with other countries.

William G. Anderson—a fast sailing bark built in 1859 at Boston, Massachusetts, by C. F. and H. D. Gardiner—was initially owned by Edmund Boynton of Boston and acquired at Boston by the Navy on 23 August 1861. William G. Anderson was commissioned at the Boston Navy Yard on 2 October 1861, Acting Volunteer Lieutenant William C. Rogers in command.

== Assigned to the West Gulf Blockade ==
Standing out to sea on 11 October, William G. Anderson joined the West Gulf Blockading Squadron, searching for Confederate privateers in the sea lanes of the West Indies. At daybreak on 12 November, lookouts on the bark made out a sail running before the wind in the Bahama channel and tacked to give chase. When within four miles, those in William G. Anderson saw the schooner bear away with the British flag at the main masthead. At 0930, the Union vessel succeeded in bringing the stranger to, and discovered her to be the Confederate privateer Beauregard, seven days out of Charleston, South Carolina. William G. Anderson sent over an officer to board the prize, who found that the crew had gotten drunk and was engaged in spiking the privateer's sole 12-pound pivot gun and cutting her rigging and sails. A prize crew took over the erstwhile privateer, and the Confederate crew was placed in irons on board William G. Anderson.

== Searching for blockade runners in the Gulf and the Caribbean ==
After bringing her prize into Key West, Florida, on 19 November, William G. Anderson set sail a week later. She cruised off Puerto Rico, Cuba, Bermuda, and the Windward Islands into the spring of the following year. She sighted 210 vessels, boarded 66, and had found Confederate privateers, in her commander's words, "rare during that time." She concluded that cruise at the Boston Navy Yard on 16 April 1862.

== Towing away a 60-ton ship while the guards are asleep ==
William G. Anderson departed Boston on 8 May and joined Rear Admiral David G. Farragut's West Gulf Blockading Squadron at Ship Island, Mississippi, off the mouth of the Mississippi River. On 14 June, Acting Master William Bailey and 30 men left the ship under cover of darkness, crossed Mississippi Sound, and sailed about 15 miles up the Jordan River. Penetrating Confederate territory by night, the Union raiders escaped notice by encamped Confederate cavalry and seized the 60-ton Confederate schooner Montebello, a ship used by local forces to transport troops across Mississippi Sound. The raiders managed to tow Montebello out into the sound before they were noticed by the Confederate forces in the vicinity.

== Stopping a ship with 350 kegs of gunpowder hidden in her hold ==
Departing the Ship Island station on 25 June, the bark patrolled the Southwest Pass of the Mississippi River before she took up a blockade station off Galveston, Texas, on 6 July. At the end of August, while on station off Galveston, William G. Anderson bagged her second prize—the English-owned schooner Lilly. The cargo manifest for Lilly showed that she was apparently carrying only salt, drugs, and quinine. Closer investigation, however, revealed 350 kegs of gunpowder and a consignment letter authorizing the British skipper to turn the material over to the first Confederate Army commander he encountered.

William, G. Anderson placed a prize crew of six men, under Acting Master C. W. Harriman, on board Lilly and sent her to Key West, Florida, while the bark resumed her patrols. On 4 September, she intercepted and captured the schooner Theresa, laden with cavalry carbines. Two weeks later, the Union bark bagged another blockade runner, the schooner Reindeer (ex-Jeff Davis) laden with 288 bales of cotton en route to Havana.

== Continued patrols seeking blockade runners ==
William G. Anderson arrived at Pensacola Bay, Florida, on 3 October and remained there on station, protecting the navy yard until the next spring. Underway on 10 April 1863, the bark resumed blockade duties off the coast of Texas soon thereafter. On 15 April, she captured the cotton-laden schooner CS Royal Yacht after a six-hour chase. Seven days later, William G. Anderson teamed with USS Rachel Seaman to capture the schooner Nymph which was attempting to run the Union blockade off Pass Cavallo.

Just eight days later, William G. Anderson spotted a sloop trying to run the blockade and gave chase. About six miles north of the lighthouse at St Joseph's Island, Texas, the sloop ran aground and was deserted by her crew. The rough seas that day made it impossible for the Union ship to send men to board the prize; but, on 3 May, the weather had abated enough to permit an expedition shoreward.

== Union Navy crew ashore attacked by Confederate cavalry ==
William G. Anderson sent in her launch, second cutter, and gig to take off the cotton from the prize. Two of the boats were just in the edge of the breakers as the gig's bow grounded on the beach. At that juncture, Confederate soldiers, under the command of Capt. Edward E. Havvy, CSA, charged down the hill nearby, firing as they advanced. The launch and the second cutter managed to clear the beach although hit several times by rifle fire; but the enemy captured the ship's gig and the five men that had been in it. William G. Anderson fired five shots from her pivot gun in an attempt to drive off the enemy, but the ship was beyond effective range.

== Resuming her Gulf Coast blockade duties ==
Stationed off Pilot Town, Louisiana, between 27 May and 24 June, William G. Anderson subsequently resumed her blockading operations off the Texas coast. On 25 August, she captured the schooner Mack Canfield laden with 133 bales of cotton off the mouth of the Rio Grande. Two days later, the armed Union bark bagged the cotton-laden schooner America; and, although the prize capsized while under tow, William G. Anderson's crew retrieved 40 bales of cotton from the sea.

After cruising off Galveston, Texas, William G. Anderson departed that vicinity on 17 September and took station off New Orleans, Louisiana. She remained there until 30 November, when she sailed back to Galveston and another stint of blockading off the Texas coast. William G. Anderson shifted to Pensacola Bay, Florida, on 19 February 1864 and served there protecting the navy yard until 1 April 1865. Entering Mobile Bay on 3 April 1865, William G. Anderson was there six days later when Lee surrendered at Appomattox Court House, Virginia, assuring the speedy end of the Civil War.

William G. Anderson remained in Mobile Bay into the late summer and was then once more stationed at Pensacola Bay, this time from 13 September to 25 November. Alternating between that port and New Orleans until mid-June 1866, the bark set course north from Pensacola on 15 June 1866, bound for the New York Navy Yard.

== Post-war decommissioning and sale ==
Arriving there on 30 June, William G. Anderson was decommissioned on 21 July 1866. The erstwhile blockade ship was sold at public auction on 28 August 1866 to A. A. Low and Brother; her subsequent fate is unrecorded.
