= USS Louisiana (1861) =

Gunboat of the United States Navy

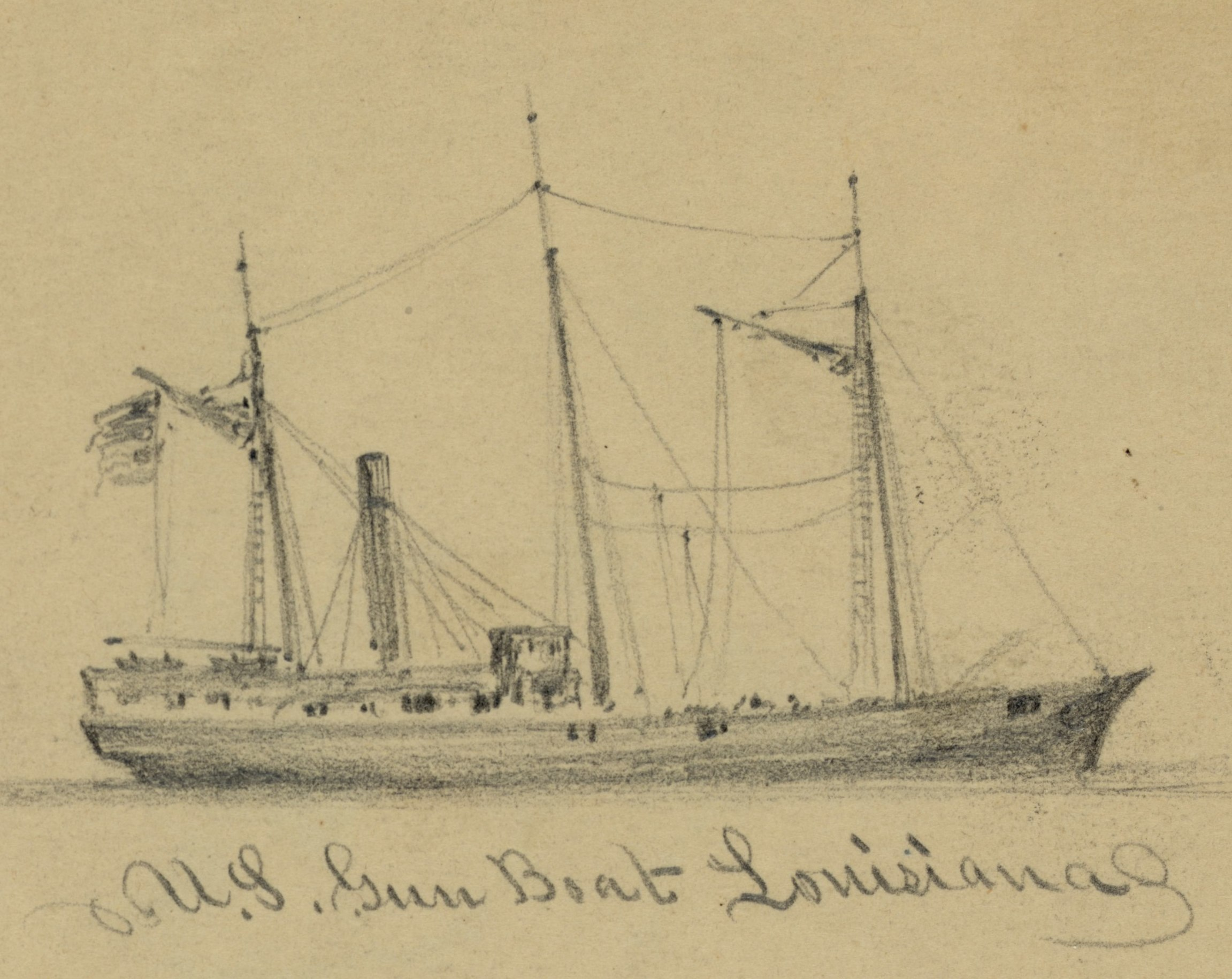
- USS Louisiana

History

United States
- Name: USS Louisiana
- Builder: Harlan and Hollingsworth
- Laid down: 1860
- Acquired: by purchase, 10 July 1861
- Commissioned: August 1861
- Stricken: 1864
- Fate: Destroyed, 24 December 1864

General characteristics
- Type: Steamer
- Displacement: 295 long tons (300 t)
- Length: 143 ft 2 in (43.64 m)
- Beam: 27 ft 3 in (8.31 m)
- Draft: 8 ft 6 in (2.59 m)
- Depth of hold: 8 ft 1 in (2.46 m)
- Propulsion: 1 inverted direct-acting condensing engine; 1 return-flue boiler; 1 four-blade propeller
- Complement: 85 officers and enlisted
- Armament: 1 × 18 pdr smoothbore Dahlgren gun; 1 × 32-pounder gun; 1 × 12-pounder Dahlgren rifle

The second USS Louisiana was a propeller-driven iron-hull steamer in the United States Navy during the American Civil War.

== Steamboat origins ==
Louisiana was built at Wilmington, Delaware, in 1860 by the Harlan & Hollingsworth Iron Shipbuilding Company. Its first owners were S & J.M. Flanagan of Philadelphia, Pennsylvania. It was purchased by the Navy at Philadelphia 10 July 1861; and commissioned in August 1861, Lieutenant Alexander Murray in command.

== Combat service ==
Assigned to the North Atlantic Blockading Squadron, until January 1862 Louisiana operated along the Virginia coast, blocking the passage of Confederate blockade runners, and attacking them at their bases. The Louisiana also participated in operations like the battle for Roanoke Island on 7–8 February 1862 and the Battle of Elizabeth City on 10 February, which denied the use of coastal inlets and seaboard towns to the blockade runners and tied down Confederate troops to guard those bases which could be held. On 13 September 1861, with Savannah, Louisiana engaged CSS Patrick Henry off Newport News, Virginia, but shot from both sides fell short. Two of her boats destroyed a schooner fitting out as a Confederate privateer in the Battle of Cockle Creek near Chincoteague Inlet 5 October, and two days later she captured schooner S. T. Carrison with a cargo of wood near Wallops Island.

Chincoteague Island was lost to the Confederacy as a base when on 14 October Louisiana's Lt. Murray witnessed the administration of the oath of allegiance to the United States to Chincoteague's citizens. Her boats, led by Lt. Alfred Hopkins, surprised and burned three Confederate vessels at Chincoteague Inlet 28 and 29 October.

== Service in North Carolina ==
On 2 January 1862, Louisiana was ordered to Hatteras Inlet to prepare for the invasion of the Carolina Sounds. For the next three years, she patrolled, supported Army troops and made raids along the many miles of the intricate water system whose eventual capture would be a mortal blow to the Confederacy. Typical of such actions was that of 6 September 1862, when she tried to aid Union troops repelling Confederate attacks on Washington, North Carolina. Their commander, Major General John G. Foster, reported that Louisiana "had rendered most efficient aid, throwing her shells with great precision, and clearing the streets, through which her guns had range."

She captured schooner Alice L. Webb at Rose Bay, North Carolina, 5 November 1862, then joined in the Army–Navy expedition which captured Greenville, North Carolina, four days later. On 20 May 1863, one of her boatcrews under Acting Master's Mate Charles W. Fisher, captured a still unrigged schooner in the Tar River north of Washington, N.C. The prize was named for Louisiana's captain, Richard T. Renshaw, and taken into the Navy as an ordnance hulk.

== The "Powder Ship" ==
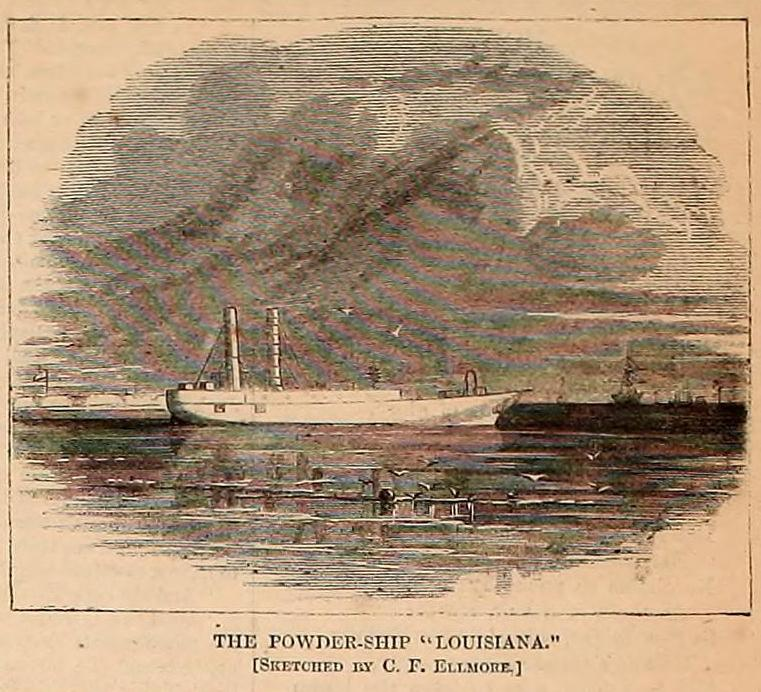
The Powder-Ship Louisiana at Federal Point; Harper's Weekly, 1865

Fort Fisher, guarding Wilmington, North Carolina, was the key to the base which northern commanders foresaw the South employing after the fall of Charleston, and Commodore David Dixon Porter and Maj. Gen. Benjamin Butler, knowing that an assault on so powerful a defense would be long and costly, hoped to reduce it by blowing up an explosive laden ship under its walls. On 26 November 1864 contrary to naval ordnance experts' advice, Louisiana was designated for this assignment, and early in December she proceeded to Hampton Roads to be partially stripped and laden with explosives. She left Hampton Roads 13 December in tow of Sassacus for Beaufort, North Carolina, where the loading of powder was completed, and five days later arrived off Fort Fisher. Here Wilderness took up the tow, and Commander Alexander Rhind with a volunteer crew prepared for the attack. Wilderness and Louisiana continued toward Fort Fisher, but were turned back by the heavy swells which with worsening weather delayed the entire amphibious attack in leaving its base at Beaufort. The final attempt was made on 23 December, when Wilderness brought Louisiana into position under Fort Fisher late in the evening. Rhind and his crew lit the fuses and kindled a fire aft, then escaped in small boats to Wilderness. waiting anxiously for 01:18 24 December, when the fuses were timed to explode. They failed, but the fire set aft worked its way from the stern to the powder and blew Louisiana up as planned, but with little effect. Several weeks later, the massed gunfire of the fleet and amphibious assault reduced the last great bastion of the Carolina Sounds.

== The wreck ==
In 1994 state underwater archaeologists and students from East Carolina University conducted a survey of the area off Fort Fisher. Though many Civil War-era wrecks were mapped, no remains were found that could be associated with that of the Louisiana.
