= George H. Bell =

Sailor for the Union in the American Civil Wan

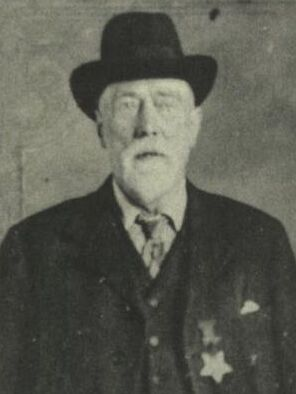
- Bell wearing his Medal of Honor, circa 1900
- Born: March 12, 1839; Sunderland, England
- Died: September 26, 1917 (aged 78)
- Burial place: Newcastle upon Tyne, England
- Military career
- Allegiance: United States
- Branch: United States Navy
- Service years: 1861 – 1865 or 1866
- Rank: Captain of the afterguard
- Unit: USS Santee
- Conflicts: American Civil War
- Awards: Medal of Honor

George H. Bell (March 12, 1839 – September 26, 1917) was a Union Navy sailor in the American Civil War and a recipient of the U.S. military's highest decoration, the Medal of Honor, for his actions during an 1861 engagement.

Born on March 12, 1839, in Sunderland, England, Bell's family moved to Newcastle upon Tyne in the mid-1840s. He began his maritime career at age fourteen and over the next seven years sailed the Atlantic Ocean, Baltic Sea, Black Sea, Caribbean Sea, Indian Ocean, and Mediterranean Sea. While docked in New York City on May 12, 1861, just after the onset of the American Civil War, Bell enlisted in the United States Navy. In July, he joined the USS Santee as an able seaman but was quickly promoted to coxswain due to his sailing experience.

At Galveston Bay, Texas, on November 7, 1861, he distinguished himself during a mission to destroy the Confederate ship Royal Yacht. For this action, he was awarded the Medal of Honor two years later, on July 10, 1863.

Bell's official Medal of Honor citation reads:

Served as pilot of the U.S.S. Santee when that vessel was engaged in cutting out the rebel armed schooner Royal Yacht from Galveston Bay, 7 November 1861, and evinced more coolness, in passing the 4 forts and the rebel steamer General Rusk, than was ever before witnessed by his commanding officer. "Although severely wounded in the encounter, he displayed extraordinary courage under the most painful and trying circumstances."

Bell died on September 26, 1917, at age 78 and was buried in Newcastle upon Tyne, England.
