= Renshaw =

Renshaw may refer to:

- USS Renshaw, several US Navy ships with this name
- Renshaw (surname), people with the surname Renshaw

== See also ==
- Renshaw cell
