= Conflict-class sloop =

- Desperate (centre) parting company with Phoenix (right) and the store ship Diligence (left) off Cape Farewell, 1852

Class overview
- Name: Conflict class
- Builders: Pembroke Dockyard
- Operators: Royal Navy
- Preceded by: HMS Niger
- Succeeded by: HMS Plumper
- Built: 1845—1849
- In service: 1849—1865
- Completed: 2
- Canceled: 2
- Scrapped: 2

General characteristics
- Type: First-class sloop
- Displacement: 1,628 tons
- Tons burthen: 1,03869/94 bm
- Length: 192 ft 6 1/2 in (58.7 m) (gundeck); 172 ft 3 1/2 in (52.5 m) (keel for tonnage)
- Beam: 34 ft 4 in (10.5 m) maximum, 34 ft 4 in (10.5 m) for tonnage
- Draught: 15 ft 9 in (4.8 m) mean
- Depth of hold: 22 ft 8 1/2 in (6.9 m)
- Installed power: 400 nhp; 699–772 ihp (521–576 kW)
- Propulsion: 4-cylinder horizontal single-expansion steam engine; Single screw
- Sail plan: Full-rigged ship
- Complement: 175
- Armament: As built: 2 × 56-pounder (85cwt) solid shot guns; 6 × 8-inch (65cwt) muzzle-loading shell guns; 2 × 32-pounder (25cwt) solid shot guns; 1857: 1 × 68-pounder (95cwt) smoothbore muzzle-loading gun; 6 × 8-inch (65cwt) muzzle-loading shell guns; 1 × 10-inch (85cwt) gun

This group of vessels were originally slated to be built to the Sampson designed steam vessel; however, the Admiralty on 9 May 1845, ordered the first pair (Conflict and Desperate) as First-Class screw sloops to be built from a design of Sir William Symonds, Surveyor of the Navy. This design would become known as the Conflict-class sloop. These would be 10-gun vessels with 400 NHP engines. The second pair of vessels (Enchantress and Falcon) were ordered on 26 March 1846 but after their keels were laid at Pembroke Dockyard, their construction was suspended in September 1846 then cancelled five years later, on 4 April 1851. Both completed ships served in the Baltic during the Crimean war, and Desperate briefly served as a store ship to Edward Augustus Inglefield's Arctic expedition. They had both been broken up by 1865.

Conflict was the fourth named vessel since its introduction for a 12-gun gun brig launched by Dudman at Deptford on 17 April 1801 and wrecked on the French Coast on 24 October 1804.

Desperate was the second named vessel since it was introduced for a 12-gun gun brig launched by White at Broadstairs on 2 January 1802, converted to a mortar brig in 1811 and sold on 15 December 1814.

Enchantress was the second named vessel since it was introduced for a 14-gun sloop purchased in 1804, reduced to Harbour service in June 1813 and listed until August 1818.

Falcon was the twenty-second named vessel since it was introduced for a Ballinger dating from 1342 and sold in 1352.

== Construction and specifications ==
Conflict's keel was laid in July 1845 at Pembroke Dockyard and launched on 5 August 1846 and Desperate's keel was laid in October 1845 and launched on 23 May 1849. Enchantress’s and Falcon’s keels were laid during 1846; however, both were suspended in September 1846 and finally cancelled on 4 April 1851. Under the original design, the gundeck was 185 ft 0 in (56.4 m) with her keel length reported for tonnage calculation of 164 ft 6.75 in (50.2 m). The maximum breadth was 34 ft 4 in (10.5 m) with 33 ft 8 in (10.3 m) reported for tonnage. She had a depth of hold of 22 ft 8.5 in (6.9 m). Her builder's measure tonnage was 992 tons.

To facilitate the installation of the screw propeller, Conflict was towed to Wigram's Yard, Blackwall to be lengthened in early 1848. During the lengthening process the propeller was installed. Desperate was also lengthened prior to launch by Admiralty Order (AO) 13 July 1848. The new dimensions were gundeck 192 ft 6.5 in (58.7 m) with her keel length reported for tonnage calculation of 172 ft 3.5 in (52.5 m). The maximum breadth remained unchanged at 34 ft 4 in (10.5 m) with 33 ft 8 in (10.3 m) reported for tonnage. The depth of hold was unchanged at 22 ft 8.5 in (6.9 m). Her builder's measured tonnage increased to 1,038 tons with a displacement of 1,628 tons.

The machinery was supplied by Maudslay, Sons & Field of Lambeth and Seaward & Capel of Millwall, London. Both vessels would ship two rectangular fire tube boilers. The Seaward horizontal single expansion (HSE) engine installed in Conflict had four cylinders of 45 inches in diameter with a 24-inch stroke. Her screw propeller was 13.5 feet in diameter. The Maudslay HSE engine in Desperate had four cylinders of 55 inches in diameter with a 30-inch stroke. Her screw propeller was only 13 feet in diameter. Both engines were rated at 400 nominal horsepower (NHP).

The armament consisted of a pair of Monk's 1839 56-pounder muzzle loading smooth bore (MLSB) of 87 hundredweight (cwt) 10-foot solid shot gun on pivot mounts, six 8-inch 65 cwt MLSB 9-foot shell guns plus two 32-pounder 25 cwt MLSB solid shot guns on broadside trucks. In 1857 The armament was changed to one 68-pounder 95 cwt MLSB 10-foot solid shot gun and one 10-inch 85 cwt MLSB 9-foot 4-inch shell gun on a pivot mount and six 8-inch 65 cwt MLSB 9-foot shell guns on broadside trucks.

=== Trials ===
During trials Conflict's engine generated 772 ihp (576 kW) indicated horsepower (IHP) for a speed of 9.378 knots. The trial runs for Desperate, her engine generated 699 699 ihp (521 kW) IHP for a speed of 9.432 knots.

Conflict was completed for sea on 20 November 1849 at a cost of: Hull – £20,496; machinery – £21,514; lengthening – £5,410; and fitting – £11,088.

Desperate was completed for sea on 9 May 1853 at a cost of £57,740 (including machinery of £21,007).

== Ships ==
Name	Ship builder	Launched	Fate
Conflict	Pembroke Dockyard	5 August 1846	Sold 1863
Desperate	Pembroke Dockyard	23 May 1849	Broken up at Devonport in August 1865
Encantress	Pembroke Dockyard	-	Suspended in September 1846 and cancelled in April 1851
Falcon	Pembroke Dockyard	-	Suspended in September 1846 and cancelled in April 1851
