= Kate Renshaw =

Australian psychologist and therapist (born 1980)

Kate Renshaw (born 25 July 1980) is an Australian play therapist, filial therapist, teacher, author, speaker, and mental health consultant from Collarenebri, New South Wales. She is best known for designing the Teacher's Optimal Relationship Approach (TORA). TORA is a mental health and well-being program that provides emotional and psychological support in primary schools for students and educators.

== Life and work ==
Renshaw, with expertise in psychology and art therapy, earned a PhD in play therapy from Deakin University in 2022. She created the TORA methodology and is recognized professionally in Australia, the U.S., and Britain.

Since 2012 she has been the founder and director of Play and Filial Therapy, operating a private practice in regional Victoria. She works with families and children and also lectures and supervises at institutions in Australia, the UK, and Ireland.

Renshaw is a researcher in the field of play therapy, with contributions to books such as Infant Play Therapy and Integrating Technology into Modern Therapies. She is an advocate for the importance of play in child development and mental health and has presented at national and international conferences. She has also shared her expertise on various platforms, including ABC Australia, ABC News Radio, The Conversation, and The Big Smoke.
