= Renishaw =

Renishaw may refer to:

- Renishaw plc - a British engineering company
- Renishaw, Derbyshire - a village in Derbyshire, England

- Renishaw Hall - a stately home in the above village.
