= Richard T. Renshaw =

- Born: March 22, 1822
- Died: March 22, 1879 (aged 57)
- Relatives: William B. Renshaw (brother)
- Military career
- Allegiance: United States of America
- Branch: United States Navy
- Service years: 1838–1874
- Rank: Captain
- Commands: USS Louisiana
- Conflicts: American Civil War

Richard T. Renshaw (March 22, 1822 – March 22, 1879) was an officer in the United States Navy during the American Civil War.

== Biography ==
Renshaw entered the Navy as a midshipman on January 26, 1838, and was commissioned acting master September 10, 1851. Resigning June 29, 1852, Renshaw reentered the Navy at the beginning of the Civil War as a lieutenant on May 13, 1861. He served in the North Atlantic Blockading Squadron commanding side-wheel gunboat Louisiana during the war, winning promotion to commander on September 22, 1862.

Renshaw stayed in the Navy following the Civil War. He was promoted to captain on September 20, 1868. He retired December 10, 1874, and died five years later on March 22, 1879.

== Namesake ==
The first USS Renshaw was named for him and his elder brother, William B. Renshaw.
