= Walter Charles Renshaw =

Walter Charles Renshaw, KC (24 September 1840 – 16 July 1922) was a British barrister, archaeologist, and genealogist.

The son of Thomas Charles Renshaw, QC, he was educated at Trinity Hall, Cambridge, before being called to the Bar in 1864. He practiced at the Chancery Bar, and become a prominent Chancery leader. Like his father, he was elected a Bencher of Lincoln's Inn, in 1890.

Outside of the law, Renshaw achieved a certain reputation as an archaeologist. He was a president of the Selden Society, chairman of the Council of the Sussex Archaeological Society and of the Sussex Record Society. He wrote several papers on genealogy.
