= Ramshaw =

Ramshaw may refer to:

== Places ==
- Ramshaw, Bishop Auckland, County Durham, England
- Ramshaw, Consett, County Durham, England
- Ramshaw, Minnesota, United States

== People ==
- Darrin Ramshaw (born 1965), Australian cricketer
- Emily Ramshaw (fl. from 2003), American journalist and news executive
- Graham Ramshaw (1945–2006), Australian rules footballer
- John Ramshaw (fl. from 1983), English footballer
- Keira Ramshaw (born 1994), English footballer
- Terry Ramshaw (1943–2017), English rugby league footballer of the 1960s and 1970s
- Tom Ramshaw (born 1991), Canadian sailor
- Wendy Ramshaw (1939–2018), British ceramicist, jeweller and sculptor

== See also ==
- Mr Ramshaw, an eagle flown by C. W. R. Knight
