= Joseph J. Cook =

American and Confederate military officer

Joseph Jarvis Cook
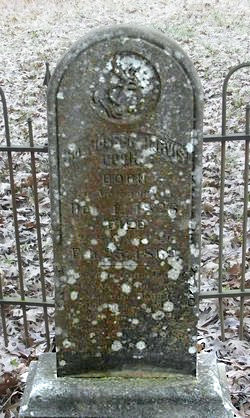
- Cook's Burial at Cook Cemetery
- Born: December 1, 1826; New Bern, North Carolina, U.S.
- Died: January 31, 1869 (aged 42); Alabama, U.S.
- Burial place: Cook Cemetery, Pickensville, Alabama, United States
- Military career
- Allegiance: United States; Confederate States
- Branch: United States Navy; Confederate States Navy
- Service years: 1848–1852; 1861–1865
- Rank: Colonel
- Conflicts: American Civil War: Operations Against Galveston; Battle of Galveston Harbor; Battle of Galveston; Second Battle of Sabine Pass

Joseph Jarvis Cook (December 1, 1826 – January 31, 1869) was a Confederate naval officer during the American Civil War. He was most notable for being the main Confederate commander at the Battle of Galveston Harbor.

== Biography ==
=== Early life ===
Cook was born on New Bern, North Carolina on December 1, 1826, as the son of Major and Mary W. Cook.

He entered military service in 1848 at Annapolis, Maryland and graduated from the United States Naval Academy in the same year but was discharged from the Navy in 1852. Due to this, he moved to Fairfield, Alabama where he would farm at his plantation until the outbreak of the American Civil War. During his life there, he married Melissa Dew in 1851 and had one daughter with her.

=== American Civil War ===
Around 1861, Cook was at Harrisburg, Texas but when the Union blockaded the Texan coast, Cook enlisted as a lieutenant colonel and formed the Active Company of Dixie Grays. This unit would spend time at Fort Herbert at the Galveston area before being merged into the 3rd Texas Artillery Battalion and Cook assuming command of the Battalion. When Union ships arrived at the area in October 1862, Cook participated at the Battle of Galveston Harbor before asking for a negotiation after the Confederate defeat but then assisting the Confederates at the Battle of Galveston at Kuhn's Wharf.

He later participated at the Second Battle of Sabine Pass and repelled the Union advance there. However he later had to get a surgery in 1864, reducing his military career before surrendering on June 2, 1865. He was paroled on August 8 of the same year and returned to Alabama. Cook later died on January 31, 1869, from unknown circumstances and was buried at Cook Cemetery, Pickensville, Alabama.
