= USS Santee =

Three ships of the United States Navy have been named USS Santee, after the Santee River of South Carolina.

- USS Santee (1855) was one of the last sailing frigates of the Navy, started in 1820 but not completed until 1855.
- USS Santee (1905) was a freighter, launched as Arvonian
- USS Santee (CVE-29) was acquired in 1940 as a fleet oiler, converted to an escort carrier in 1942, and in service until 1946.
