= Santee (surname) =

Santee is a surname. Notable people with the surname include:

- Corey Santee (born 1983), American basketball player
- David Santee (born 1957), American figure skater
- James Santee (born 1962), American figure skater
- Milton Santee (1835–1901), American civil engineer, surveyor, miner, real estate developer, and entrepreneur
- Wes Santee (1932–2010), American athlete
