= USS Santee (1855) =

Gunboat of the United States Navy

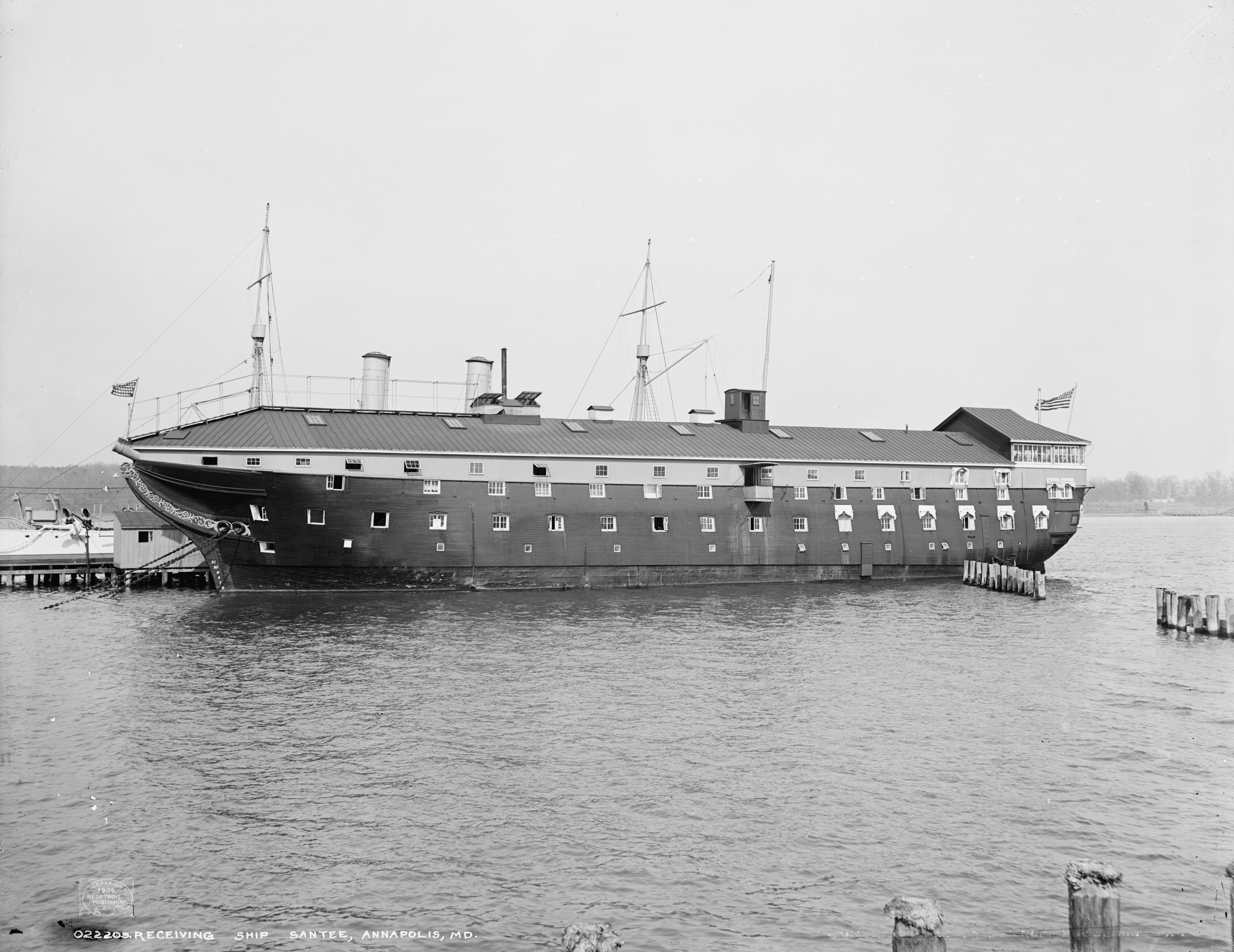
- The USS Santee moored at the United States Naval Academy, 1905 as a Barracks Ship.

History

United States
- Laid down: 1820
- Launched: 16 February 1855
- Commissioned: 9 June 1861
- Fate: sank at moorings 2 April 1912; Sold 2 August 1912; Raised February 1913; Burned 1913

General characteristics
- Tonnage: 1726
- Length: 190 ft (58 m) (between perpendiculars)
- Beam: 45 ft (14 m)
- Depth of hold: 14 ft 5 in (4.39 m)
- Propulsion: sail
- Complement: 480 officers and enlisted
- Armament: 2 × 64 pdr (29 kg) guns; 10 × 8 in (200 mm) shell guns; 20 × 32 pdr (15 kg) guns (.57 cwt); 16 × 32 pdr (15 kg) guns (.33 cwt); 2 × heavy 12 pdr (5.4 kg) guns

USS Santee was a wooden-hulled, three-masted sailing frigate of the United States Navy. She was the first U.S. Navy ship to be so named and was one of its last sailing frigates in service. She was acquired by the Union Navy at the start of the American Civil War, outfitted with heavy guns and a crew of 480, and was assigned as a gunboat in the Union blockade of the Confederate States. She later became a training ship then a barracks ship for the U.S. Naval Academy.

== Service history ==
Rated at 44 guns, she was laid down in 1820 by the Portsmouth Navy Yard, but due to a shortage of funds, she long remained uncompleted on the stocks. She was finally launched on 16 February 1855, but not commissioned until 9 June 1861, Captain Henry Eagle in command. Santee departed Portsmouth, New Hampshire on 20 June 1861, stopped at Hampton Roads, Virginia to load ammunition, and resumed her voyage to the Gulf of Mexico on 10 July. On 8 August, the frigate captured the schooner C. P. Knapp in the gulf some 350 miles south of Pensacola and escorted the blockade runner to that port. On 27 October, Santee took her second prize, Delta, off Galveston; the hermaphrodite brig had attempted to slip into Galveston with a cargo of salt from Liverpool.

Shortly before midnight on 7 November, boats left the frigate and entered Galveston Bay hoping to capture and burn the Confederate armed steamer, General Rusk. However, in attempting to avoid detection, the boats ran aground. Since he had lost the advantage of surprise, the expedition's commander, Lt. James Edward Jouett, cancelled his plans to attack General Rusk and turned his attention to the chartered Confederate lookout vessel, CS Royal Yacht. After a desperate hand-to-hand fight, he captured Royal Yacht's crew, set the armed schooner afire, and retired to Santee with about a dozen prisoners. During the action, one man from the frigate was killed and two of her officers and six of her men were wounded, one mortally. A young 15-year-old sailor named James Henry Carpenter was wounded in the thigh and mentioned in dispatches due to his actions. Carpenter would become Santee's acting Master's mate and would serve again on Santee when she served as a school ship for the United States Naval Academy. Another of Santee's sailors, George H. Bell, was awarded the Medal of Honor for his part in the action.

On 30 December, after a five or six-mile chase on boats from Santee, they captured 14-ton Confederate schooner, Garonne. Captain Eagle stripped the prize for use as a lighter. In January 1862, when the Union naval force in the Gulf of Mexico was divided into two squadrons, Santee was assigned to Flag Officer David Farragut's new West Gulf Blockading Squadron. Under the new organization, Santee continued to blockade the Texas coast, primarily off Galveston, until summer. Then, because scurvy had weakened the frigate's crew and the enlistments of many of her sailors had expired, the ship sailed north. She reached Boston, Massachusetts on 22 August and was decommissioned on 4 September.

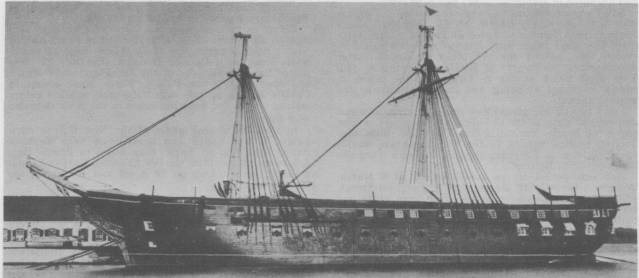
The former USS Santee being used as a training ship, classroom and barracks ship about 1875 at the US Naval Academy.

Refitted at the Boston Navy Yard, the ship was recommissioned there exactly a month later and sailed for Newport, Rhode Island, to serve as a school ship at the Naval Academy, which had been moved there from Annapolis, Maryland, for security during the Civil War. At Newport, midshipmen lived, studied, and attended classes in frigates Santee and Constitution as they prepared for positions of leadership in the Union Navy. After the close of the Civil War, the Naval Academy returned to Annapolis, Maryland, and Santee, carrying midshipmen, sailed for that port and moored near Fort Severn on 2 August 1865. There, she continued her duty as school ship which she had performed at Newport.

=== Post-war career ===
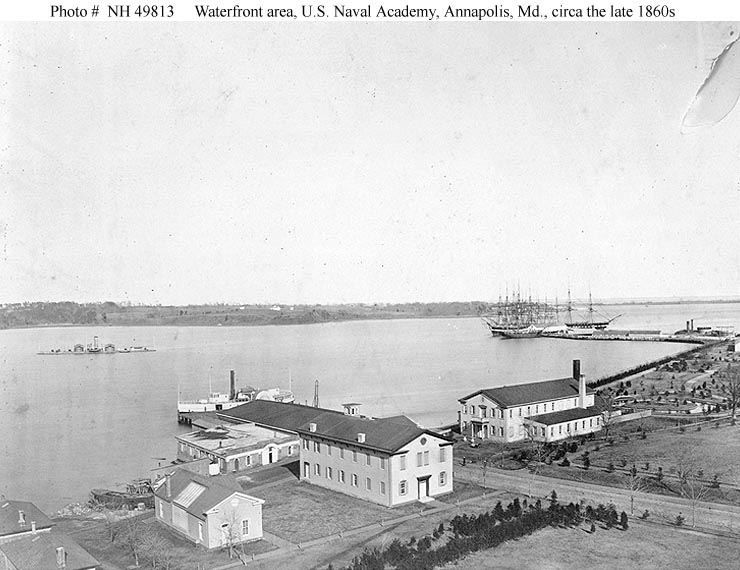
US Naval Academy waterfront in the late 1860s with the barrack/school ships USS Constitution and Santee tied up in the background. Other ships not identified.

In 1866, she became a gunnery ship and was used by midshipmen to master the art of naval gunnery. About the same time, the frigate began to be used as a barracks ship for midshipmen being punished and for new fourthclassmen receiving their first taste of Navy life.

Before dawn on 2 April 1912, after a half a century of duty as an educator, Santee sank at her mooring. Efforts to refloat the frigate proved unsuccessful. She was sold to Henry A. Hitner's Sons Company, of Philadelphia, Pennsylvania, on 2 August 1912, the anniversary of her arrival at Annapolis. After six months of effort, she was finally raised; and, on 8 May 1913, Santee departed the Severn River under tow and proceeded to Boston, where she was burned for the copper and brass in her hull.

== See also ==
- List of sailing frigates of the United States Navy
