= William B. Renshaw =

American Civil War naval officer

William Bainbridge Renshaw
- Born: October 11, 1816; Brooklyn, New York U.S.
- Died: January 1, 1863 (aged 46); Galveston, Texas Confederate States
- Relatives: Richard T. Renshaw (brother)
- Military career
- Allegiance: United States of America
- Branch: United States Navy
- Service years: 1831–1863
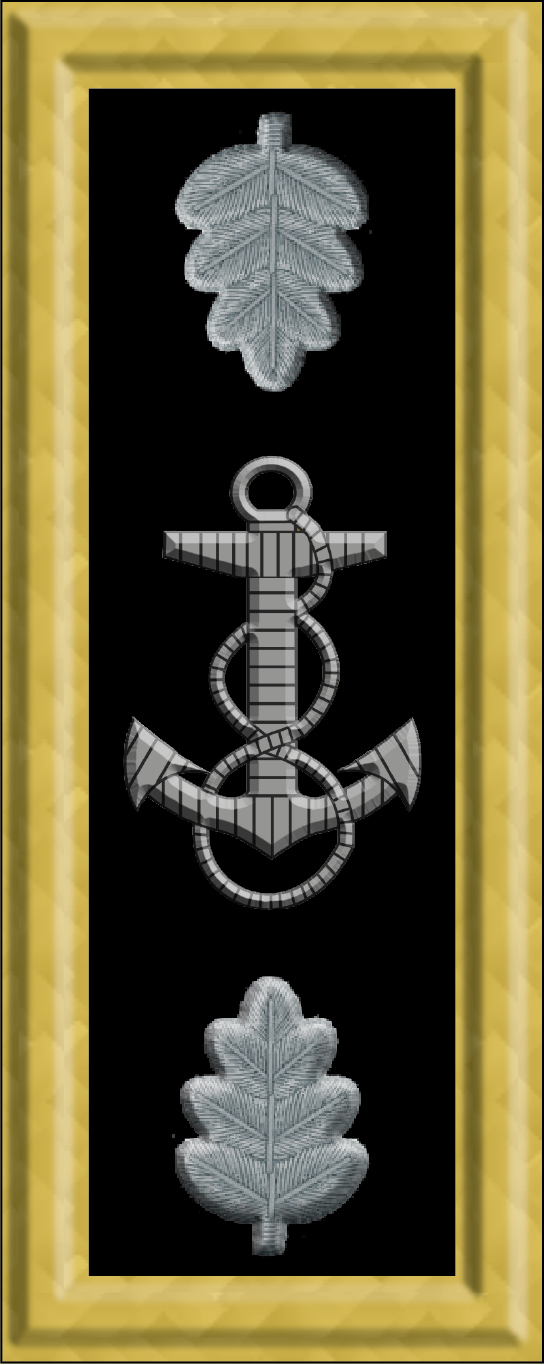
- Rank: Commander
- Commands: Westfield
- Conflicts: American Civil War: First Battle of Galveston; Second Battle of Galveston †

William Bainbridge Renshaw (October 11, 1816 – January 1, 1863) was an officer in the United States Navy during the American Civil War. He was killed during the Second Battle of Galveston.

== Biography ==
Renshaw was born in Brooklyn, New York, to a naval family. His father, Commodore James Renshaw, had served with William Bainbridge, and subsequently named his son for the naval hero. Renshaw followed his father into the U.S. Navy and was appointed as a midshipman in November 1831. He served on a variety of sailing ships and outposts for the next twenty years.

He was appointed commander on April 26, 1861, during the early days of the Civil War. Renshaw was attached to Admiral David Farragut's squadron for most of the war and was commended for the "handsome manner in which he managed his vessel", Westfield, during Mortar Flotilla operations on the Mississippi River in 1862.

He was in charge of the Union fleet blockading the port of Galveston, Texas, toward the end of the year, and fought in the First Battle of Galveston. On January 1, 1863, during the Second Battle of Galveston, Renshaw refused to surrender his flagship. He set fire to her to keep her out of Confederate hands, but died in the ensuing explosion. His failure to intercept the cotton ships cost the Union the battle.

== Namesakes ==
Three later U.S. Navy ships have been named USS Renshaw. The first was jointly named for him and his younger brother, Richard T. Renshaw. The later two were solely for William Renshaw.
