= HMS Desperate (1849) =

Sloop of the Royal Navy

- Desperate (centre) parting company with Phoenix (right) and the store ship Diligence (left) off Cape Farewell, 1852

History

United Kingdom
- Name: Desperate
- Ordered: 9 May 1845
- Builder: Pembroke Dockyard
- Laid down: October 1845
- Launched: 23 May 1849
- Commissioned: 12 April 1852
- Honours and awards: Baltic 1854 - 55, Crimea, Black Sea 1855
- Fate: Broken at Devonport Dockyard August 1865

General characteristics
- Type: First-class sloop
- Displacement: 1,628 tons
- Tons burthen: 1,03869/94 bm
- Length: 192 ft 6 1/2 in (58.7 m) (gundeck); 172 ft 3 1/2 in (52.5 m) (keel for tonnage)
- Beam: 34 ft 4 in (10.5 m) maximum, 34 ft 4 in (10.5 m) for tonnage
- Draught: 15 ft 9 in (4.8 m) mean
- Depth of hold: 22 ft 8 1/2 in (6.9 m)
- Installed power: 400 nhp; 699–772 ihp (521–576 kW)
- Propulsion: 4-cylinder horizontal single-expansion steam engine; Single screw
- Sail plan: Full-rigged ship
- Complement: 175
- Armament: As built: 2 × 56-pounder (85 cwt) solid shot guns; 6 × 8-inch (65 cwt) muzzle-loading shell guns; 2 × 32-pounder (25cwt) solid shot guns; 1857: 1 × 68-pounder (95 cwt) smoothbore muzzle-loading gun; 6 × 8-inch (65 cwt) muzzle-loading shell guns; 1 × 10-inch (85cwt) gun

HMS Desperate was originally slated to be built to the Sampson designed steam vessel rated as a Steam Vessel First Class (SV1); however, the Admiralty, first rerated the vessels as First Class Sloops on 19 April 1845 then on the 9 May 1845, she was ordered as First-Class screw sloops to be built from a design of Sir William Symonds, Surveyor of the Navy. She would be a 10-gun vessel with 400 NHP engines. She served in the Baltic during the Crimean War, and as a store ship to Edward Augustus Inglefield's Arctic expedition. She was broken up by 1865.

Desperate was the second named vessel since it was introduced for a 12-gun gun brig launched by White at Broadstairs on 2 January 1802, converted to a mortar brig in 1811 and sold on 15 December 1814.

== Construction ==
Desperate's keel was laid in October 1845 at Pembroke dockyard and launched, after lengthening for the installation of her propeller, on 23 May 1849. She was completed for sea on 9 May 1853. The trial runs for Desperate, her engine generated 699 699 ihp (521 kW) IHP for a speed of 9.432 knots. Desperate was completed for sea on 9 May 1853 at a cost of £57,740 (including machinery of £21,007).

== Commissioned service ==
=== First commission ===
Her first commission was on 12 April 1852 under Lieutenant Frederick H. Stevens, RN to accompany as far as the ice, Sir Edward Belcher's squadron to search for the lost Franklin Expedition in its search for the Northwest Passage. She recommissioned on 18 December 1852 at Plymouth, under Captain William W. Chambers, RN to accompany Phoenix. She accompanied Phoenix as far as Cape Farewell, Greenland for Edward Augustus Inglefield's Arctic expedition bringing supplies to Edward Belcher's search for Franklin's lost expedition. In October 1853 she sailed for Lisbon, Portugal. She returned to Home Waters for a change of commanders. On 29 March 1854 under Captain Ewin C.T. d'Enycourt, RN she saw service in the Baltic during the Russian War. She returned to Home Waters on 20 September 1854 to avoid the winter freeze up in the Baltic. The squadron returned to the Baltic on 17 April 1855. On 6 January 1855 she received a new commander in Commander Richard D. White, RN. On 10 May with her new commander, Commander George M. Jackson, RN she was transferred to the Mediterranean. She received a new commander on 11 November 1857 as Commander Robert G. Craigie, RN. She paid off at Plymouth on 1 January 1859.

=== Second commission ===
Her second Commission commenced on 19 October 1860 under the command of Commander John F. Ross at Devonport, then for service on the North America and West Indies Station. On 14 May 1861 she was proceeding to Plymouth with HMS St George to embark Prince Alfred prior to proceeding to the North America and West Indies Station. She served off Mexico, occupying Vera Cruz, after the Mexicans had postponed the payment of indemnities to Britons who had suffered in recent revolutions. On 31 July 1862 Commander Arthur T. Thrupp took command. In mid 1863 she returned to Home Waters paying off at Plymouth on 7 November 1863.

== Disposition ==
She was broken at Devonport Dockyard in August 1865.
