= Texas Marine Department =

The Texas Marine Department (1861–1865) (alt Marine Department of Military District of Texas, New Mexico, and Arizona, Trans-Mississippi Marine Department) was formed in the State of Texas shortly after Texas came under blockade from the Union Navy in 1861. It operated under the control of the Confederate Navy during the Civil War.

"The Texas Marine Department, an organization unique in the Confederacy, combined the roles of a conventional navy, revenue service, and military logistics command."

The ships in the Marine Department mainly consisted of small vessels, improvised cottonclad warships, and some captured US Navy ships.

The Department was instrumental in the liberation of Galveston, occupied by the Union, and winning the Battle of Galveston on January 1, 1863. It was disbanded at the end of the war.

== Commanders ==
- Commander William W. Hunter: from 1861 until December 1862. Hunter was a regular Confederate States Navy's commander (later in the war promoted to Captain, commanded the Savannah squadron).
- Leon Smith: December 1862 - August 1864. Smith was variously described as lieutenant, captain, major, colonel, and commodore, but was a volunteer not actually commissioned in either the Confederate army or navy, despite General John B. Magruder's repeated attempts to secure a commission for him.
- Lieutenant Joseph Nicholson Barney: regular Confederate States Navy officer sent to take control of operation, however following discussions with Magruder who was not willing to relinquish controls of the cottonclads, Barney conceded the appointment, and in a letter to Confederate naval secretary Stephen Mallory recommended that the navy relinquish control. Barney later explained that he made his recommendation since he considered that the presence of two separate marine forces with independent commanders would lead to discord and confusion.
- Captain Henry S. Lubbock: August 1864 - end of war. Not commissioned in Confederate States Navy, captain probably due to being ship's captain.

== Ships ==
- A. S. Ruthven, side-wheel steamer - transport
- CS Bayou City, steamer - cottonclad gunboat
- CSS Clifton, side-wheel steamer - gunboat (Ex-USS Clifton): Burned March 21, 1864
- Colonel Stell, side-wheel steamer - transport: Surrendered
- Corpus Christi - gunboat
- CSS Diana, steamer - transport, cottonclad and ironclad gunboat ram
- Dime, steamer - transport and tender
- Era No. 3, steamer - patrol ship and transport
- CSS Fanny Morgan, yacht - guard boat, dispatch boat
- Florilda, steamer - transport
- General Rusk, side-wheel steamer - picket boat, signal boat, tow boat, blockade runner: Captured
- George Buckhart, schooner - gunboat, guard boat: Captured March 17, 1865
- Grand Bay, stern-wheel steamer - transport
- Island City, side-wheel steamer - supply boat
- Jeff Davis, steamer - transport
- John F. Carr, steamer - transport and cottonclad gunboat
- Josiah A. Bell, side-wheel steamer - cottonclad gunboat
- Lone Star, side-wheel steamer - transport
- Lucy Gwin, stern-wheel steamer - transport
- Mary Hill, side-wheel steamer - gunboat, transport, picket ship, guard ship
- CS Neptune, steamer - gunboat, tugboat, picket boat, transport: Sunk 1863
- Roebuck, side-wheel steamer - unarmed cottonclad transport
- Sachem (1863), screw steamer - gunboat (Ex-USS Sachem) (1863-1864); blockade runner (1864)
- Sunflower, steamer - cottonclad transport
- CSS Uncle Ben, steamer - cottonclad gunboat

== See also ==
- Battle of Galveston
- USRC Harriet Lane (1857)
- List of ships of the Confederate States Navy
- Confederate States Army
- American Civil War

== Bibliography ==
- Hall, Andrew W. (2012). "Chapter 5: The Texas Marine Department". The Galveston-Houston packet : steamboats on Buffalo Bayou. Charleston, SC: History Press. ISBN 9781609495916. OCLC 812531247.
- Marmion, Bob (1985). A Texas soldier & marine during the Civil War, 1861-65: A short biography of Captain James R. Marmion's service in the Confederate States Army and the Texas Marine Department. Melbourne, Australia: n.a. OCLC 12741684.
- Bullard, Thomas R. (1988). Civil War Naval Squadrons. n.a. OCLC 19608916.
