= PS Denbigh =

Paddle steamer and blockade runner, 1860–1865

History
- Name: Denbigh
- Owner: Robert Gardner
- Route: Liverpool-Rhyl
- Builder: John Laird, Son, and Company
- Cost: £10,150
- Launched: 1860
- Fate: run aground and destroyed by gunfire

General characteristics
- Type: paddle steamer

The Denbigh was a paddle steamer built in 1860 by John Laird, Son, and Company at Birkenhead. She initially sailed between Liverpool and Rhyl, north Wales but was later sold and used as a blockade runner before being destroyed in 1865.

== History ==
Denbigh was constructed in 1860 at the shipyard of John Laird, Son, and Company at Birkenhead, England, at a cost of £10,150. She was a fast ship for her time, recording 13.7 knots (25.4 km/h) in her proving trials. She was delivered to her owner, Robert Gardner of Manchester, on 26 September 1860, after which she operated the route between Liverpool and Rhyl, north Wales, for the next three years.

In September 1863 the Denbigh was purchased by the European Trading Company – a partnership between the H.O. Brewer Company, a trading company of Mobile, Alabama, Confederate States of America, Emile Erlanger & Co., bankers from Paris, France, and J. H. Schröder & Co., bankers of Manchester. The company bought ships to run the United States' naval blockade of Southern ports.

The United States Consul in Liverpool, Thomas Dudley, immediately noted the Denbigh and sent a report to the State Department which included the description:

Schooner rigged, side wheel steamer "Denbigh" of Liverpool -- 162 tons. Captain McNevin Carriers -- Northe Dock for Bermuda & Havannah. Mose & Co. Cosignees. The following is her present description, subject to alteration:

Built of Iron. Marked draft of water -- 7 feet (2.1 m) fore & aft. Hull painted black. Artificial quarter galleries. Elliptic stern. Straight stem. Name at the bows gilt, on a blue ground. Wheel; binnacle. House with skylight on top. Boat painted white in iron swing davits on port quarter. Boats painted white, abreast of mainmast. House athwartships between paddle boxes, with binacle on top. Funnell or smokestack painted black, with bright copper steam pipe after part of same. Side houses. Hurricane deck; foremast, through same. Masts bright; mast heads, top caps, crosstrees, bowsprit and gaff painted white. Inside of bulwarks & c. painted cream color. On her trial trip she attained the speed of 10½ knots.

Her crew consisted of Captain, two mates, two engineers, six seamen, seven firemen, cook and steward.

Sailed Monday Oct. 19, 1863

After almost two years of blockade running and 13 successful trips, Denbigh ran aground on Bird Key, off Galveston, where she was destroyed by Union naval vessels on 24 May 1865.

== Some members of Denbighs' crew ==
=== Francis McNevin ===
Although it has been widely believed that Edmund McNevin was the captain of the Denbigh, according to the Agreement and Account of Crew when the Denbigh sailed/steamed to Bermuda and Havana in October 1863, the master and captain was actually Francis McNevin. The master's certificate number shown on that document was 11250 and according to Index of Captains Registers of Lloyds of London had been issued to Francis McNevin, b. 1829, St. Helier, Jersey.

=== Robert Railton ===
Railton was engineer of the Denbigh. He was born in Manchester on 11 December 1830. He emigrated to the United States in the 1840s, working in many factories including the Hinkly Locomotive Works in Boston, Massachusetts, the principal railway works in the US. In 1848 he moved to Galveston, Texas, to work in Hiram Close's foundry, the only foundry in the town, until the outbreak of the Civil War. On New Year's Day 1863, at the Battle of Galveston the Union gunboat Westfield was blown up by her own crew to prevent her falling into Confederate hands; Railton was responsible for superintending the recovery of the paddle wheel shafts and reboring them as 5.70 guns. He joined the Denbigh in August 1864 on her first voyage into Galveston. The engineer received between $1000 and $2000 in gold for each successful trip. After the Civil War he married Emma Juliff in Galveston in 1868. He was killed in an unfortunate accident—on 27 December 1898 an argument broke out between workers on Galveston quay, and one started shooting. Railton was hit in the back by a stray shot and died the next day.

=== Robert A. Horlock ===
Horlock was a cabin boy on the Denbigh. Born in 1849, he joined the Denbigh at Galveston when he was fifteen years old. It appears that he obtained his position through his father, who knew Captain Godfrey. A cabin boy's job was similar to a naval midshipman, learning the work of a ship's officer. Robert Horlock died in 1926.

=== William Young ===
A guard on the Denbigh, he was a member of Company B, First Texas Heavy Artillery, before transferring to the Texas Marine Department, and joined the Denbigh on 30 August 1864. He died on 1 May 1901.

=== William Fairweather ===
Occupation unknown, he was 34 years old when he drowned on 7 September 1864.
