= Joseph Nicolson =

Joseph Nicolson may refer to:

- Joseph Nicolson (antiquarian) (fl. 1777), co-author with Richard Burn of The History and Antiquities of the Counties of Westmorland and Cumberland
- Sir Joseph Nicolson, 5th Baronet (1800-c. 1839) of the Nicolson baronets
- Colonel Joseph Nicolson, see Battle of North Point

== See also ==
- Joseph Nicholson (disambiguation)
