= Joseph Nicholson =

Joseph Nicholson may refer to:

- Joseph Nicholson (public official), Maryland politician
- Joseph Hopper Nicholson (1770–1817), early Maryland attorney
- Joseph Shield Nicholson (1850–1927), English economist
- Joe Nicholson (1898–1974), English footballer

== See also ==
- Joseph Nicholson Barney (1818–1899), United States Navy officer
- Joseph Nicolson (disambiguation)
- Nicholson (name)
