= CSS Jamestown =

Steamboat

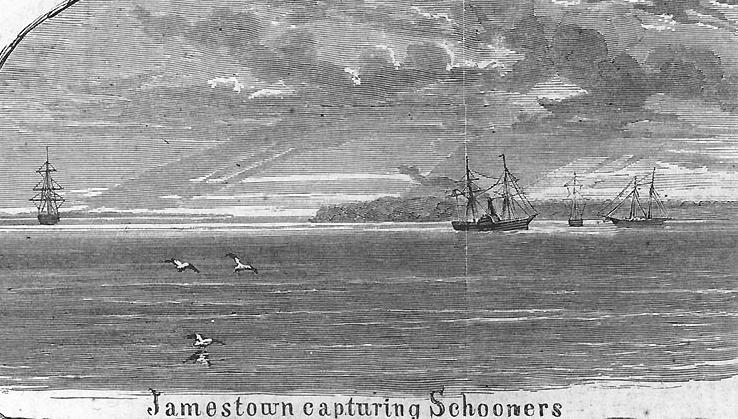
- CSS Jamestown moving in to capture merchant schooners in Hampton Roads, April 11, 1862. (Line engraving originally published in Harper's Weekly in 1862.)

History

Confederate States
- Name: Jamestown
- Namesake: Jamestown, Virginia
- Launched: 1853
- Commissioned: July 1861
- Decommissioned: May 15, 1862
- Fate: Sunk to obstruct James River

General characteristics
- Displacement: 1300 tons
- Length: 250 ft (76 m)
- Beam: 34 ft (10 m)
- Draft: 17 ft (5.2 m)
- Propulsion: Steam engine
- Armament: 2 guns

CSS Jamestown, originally a side-wheel, passenger steamer, was built at New York City in 1853, and seized at Richmond, Virginia in 1861 for the Virginia Navy during the early days of the American Civil War. She was commissioned by the Confederate States Navy (CSN) the following July (after the Virginia Navy was transferred to the CSN), and renamed CSS Thomas Jefferson but was generally referred to as Jamestown, after Jamestown, Virginia.

Brigantine-rigged Jamestown was designed and constructed by the well-known shipbuilder William H. Webb for the New York and Old Dominion Line as a sister to Yorktown, which became CSS Patrick Henry.

== Career ==
With Lt. Joseph Nicholson Barney, CSN, in command, she was actively employed until the end of her career in May 1862. Her service was highlighted by the Battle of Hampton Roads on March 8–9 1862, during which she assisted CSS Virginia in attacking USS Congress and USS Cumberland and stood by during the battle between USS Monitor and Virginia. The Confederate Congress tendered special thanks to the officers and crew of Jamestown for their "gallant conduct and bearing" in combat.

Some 4 weeks later, on April 11, 1862, Jamestown, Virginia and five other Confederate ships sailed from Norfolk, Virginia, into Hampton Roads in full view of the Union squadron there. When it became clear that the Federal ships were not going to attack, Jamestown, covered by Virginia and the others, moved in, captured three merchant ships, and helped by CSS Raleigh, towed them to Norfolk. The merchant ships were the brigs Marcus of Stockton, NJ and Sabout of Providence, RI and the schooner Catherine T. Dix of Accomac County, VA. Their flags were hoisted "Union-side down" to taunt the Federals into fighting. Later that month Jamestown was despatched from Norfolk to cooperate with Major General John B. Magruder, CSA, in the James River, and early in May she was used to transport army sick and wounded to Richmond, Virginia.

1865 picture of Wreckage of CSS Jamestown in the James River. (Photograph by Mathew Brady)

On the night of May 5, Jamestown and Patrick Henry proceeded to Norfolk and returned the following night with CSS Richmond, CSS Hampton and ordnance store boats, passing the Federal battery at Newport News, Virginia unobserved on both occasions. A second attempt to return to Norfolk met with failure. On May 8, Jamestown was ordered to notify Stephen Mallory, Secretary of the Confederate States Navy, of the continuing engagement of two Federal gunboats and ironclad USS Galena with the Confederate batteries at Day's Point. Unable to carry out her assignment, Jamestown retired up the James River as far as Drewry's Bluff, where on May 15, 1862, she was sunk to obstruct the channel.

== Commanders ==
The commanders of the CSS Jamestown were:

- Lt. Joseph Nicholson Barney (1861–1862)
- Lt. George W. Harrison (May 1862, temporarily)

== See also ==
- List of ships of the Confederate States Navy
- Steamships
- Bibliography of American Civil War naval history
- James River Squadron
- Union Navy

== Bibliography ==
- Coski, John M. (1996). Capital Navy: The Men, Ships and Operations of the James River Squadron. Savas Woodbury Publishers, Campbell, CA. p. 344. ISBN 9781882810031.
- Heidler, David Stephen (2004). Encyclopedia of the War of 1812. Naval Institute Press, Annapolis, Md., 2004. p. 636. ISBN 1-59114-362-4.
