= Joseph Nicholson Barney =

United States and Confederate Army naval officer (fl. 1839–1852)

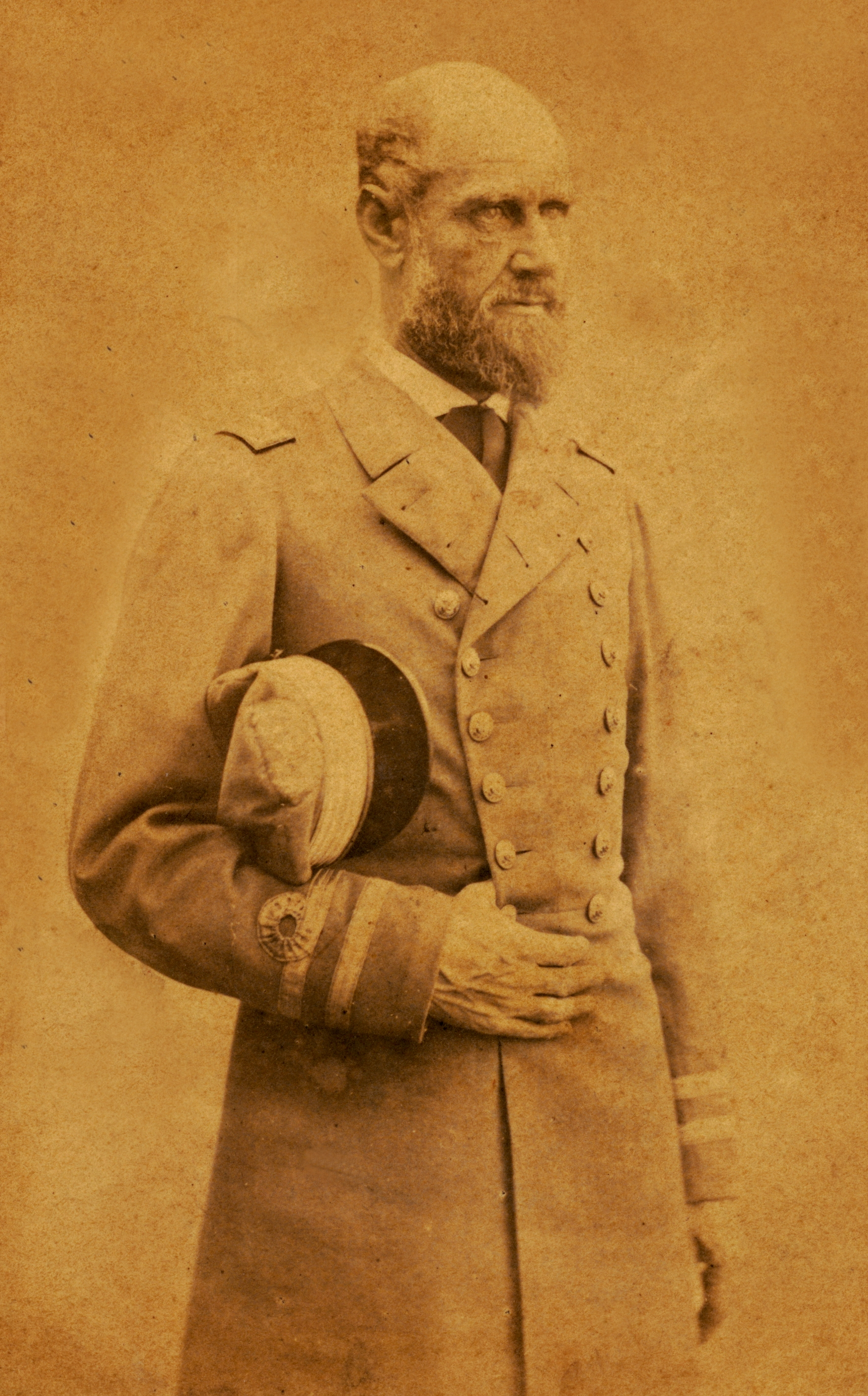
- Commander Joseph Nicholson Barney. Picture appeared as part of a composite of CSS Florida with crew members.
- Born: c. 1818; Baltimore, Maryland, U.S.
- Died: 16 June 1899 (aged 80–81); Fredericksburg, Virginia, U.S.
- Military career
- Allegiance: United States; Confederate States
- Branch: United States Navy; Confederate States Navy
- Rank: Lieutenant (U.S. Navy); Commander (C.S. Navy) (Note: Some post-war sources (as well as his gravestone) refer to him as captain. However his actual Confederate rank was commander, as listed in the January 1864 Confederate naval register, with sources covering wartime service stating he held that rank from 1863.)
- Commands: CSS Jamestown (1861–1862); CSS Harriet Lane (1863); CSS Florida (September 1863)
- Conflicts: Battle of Hampton Roads, March 8–9, 1862; Drewry's Bluff (May 15, 1862)

Joseph Nicholson Barney (c. 1818 – June 16, 1899) was a career United States Navy officer (1835–1861) who served in the Confederate States Navy in the American Civil War (1861–1865).

== Personal life and family ==
Barney was born in Baltimore in about 1818, the son of U.S. Congressman John Barney and Elizabeth Nicholson Hindman and the grandson of United States Navy Commodore Joshua Barney. He married Eliza Jacobs Rogers on June 9, 1846, in New Castle County, Delaware, with whom he had one daughter before her death in 1848. He married a second time in 1858 to Anne (Nannie) Seddon Dornin, daughter of Thomas Aloysius Dornin, with whom he had eight children. He died at his home in Fredericksburg, Virginia, aged 81, on June 16, 1899, after a month-long illness. His second wife died on October 11, 1913.

His grandson Thomas Holcomb was Commandant of the United States Marine Corps (1936–1943) and first Marine to achieve the rank of general.

== United States Navy ==
He entered a naval academy in 1832 (Note: This is incorrectly stated by many sources as the United States Naval Academy in Annapolis. However, the Naval Academy was founded in 1845.) and received a warrant in the United States Navy as a midshipman in 1835, (Note: At the time, the United States Navy was using ranks similar to early 19th century Royal Navy ranks.) was promoted to passed midshipman in 1841, the first of 22 passed by the board of examination. (Note: Some later sources state this as his naval academy graduation date and entry to service, a mistake which probably arises from the evolution of the term midshipman in the later 19th century to a naval academy cadet. Passed midshipman, at the time, was an actual United States Navy rank.) By 1843, he was acting master of the USS Vincennes. He was promoted to lieutenant in 1847.

His postings included the USS Potomac, USS Columbia, USS Vincennes, USS Cyane, the Norfolk Naval Shipyard, and USS Susquehanna. In 1861, at the beginning of the American Civil War, he held the position of first lieutenant on the USS Susquehanna in the Mediterranean Sea. Upon returning to the United States on June 6, he resigned his commission the same day.

== Confederate States Navy ==
Barney was appointed a lieutenant in the Confederate States Navy on July 2, 1861. He commanded the CSS Jamestown during the Battle of Hampton Roads, the famous battle with the USS Monitor, during which he captured two brigs and an Accomac schooner off Newport News Point while the CSS Virginia held the Union Navy's attention. After the Confederate evacuation of Norfolk, the Jamestown was scuttled to block the James River at Drewry's Bluff. In the subsequent Battle of Drewry's Bluff, in which Confederate shore batteries drove off a Union Navy force heading towards Richmond, the Jamestown's guns were considered the main factor in repulsing the enemy ships. Following the battle, he received praise from the Confederate Congress and was promoted to commander.

In early 1863, Barney was briefly assigned command of naval operations in Galveston, including the revenue cutter Harriet Lane, captured in the Battle of Galveston. However the ship was already under command of Leon Smith, (Note: Leon Smith is variously referred to as lieutenant, captain, major, colonel, and commodore by different sources. While referred to by Magruder as a commissioned officer and recommended for a formal commission, Smith never actually entered navy or army service. De facto, as "Commander, Marine Department of Texas", he was in charge of all or most marine operations in the area of Texas under General Magruder's control, commanding several vessels.) an army volunteer and steamboat captain, who had played a role in capturing the ship, having been placed in command of the ship by Major General John B. Magruder and in control of additional ships improvised as a "cottonclad fleet". The ship was also considered by the navy to be too slow and inefficient to become a blockade runner, though it was later used in this capacity. Following discussions with Magruder, who was not willing to relinquish controls of the cottonclads, Barney conceded the appointment, and in a letter to Confederate Naval Secretary Stephen Mallory, recommended that the navy relinquish control. Barney later explained that he made his recommendation since he considered that the presence of two separate marine forces with independent commanders would lead to discord and confusion.

Barney was sent to Europe in spring 1863. He assumed command of the Confederate raider CSS Florida in September 1863, relieving the ailing John Newland Maffitt, and oversaw her refit at Brest, France, but had to be detached due to ill health before the Florida put to sea. From 1864 to 1865, he was a Confederate naval agent in Europe.

He returned to the United States following the war, and took the Oath of Allegiance to the U.S. Constitution in September 1865.

== Later life ==
After the Civil War ended, Barney retired to Powhatan County, Virginia, before moving to Fredericksburg in 1874. Barney was active in the insurance business there until retiring in 1895. He was also an elder in the Presbyterian Church.

Barney and his wife were active in activities promoting the memory of the Confederacy. His wife played a role in fundraising for a Confederate memorial in Fredericksburg as secretary of the city's Ladies' Memorial Association, which funded the monument. Joseph and Bradley T. Johnson led the unveiling ceremony of the monument in 1891.

== See also ==
- Letterbook of Joseph Nicholson Barney, Special Collections Branch, United States Naval Academy
- Joseph Nicholson Barney Log and Diary, 1839–1852, Southern Historical Collection
- Register of Officers of the Confederate States Navy. Office of Naval Records and Library United States Navy Department. Mattituck, NY: J.M. Carroll & Company. 1983. ISBN 0-8488-0011-7.
