= John B. Magruder =

American and Confederate military officer

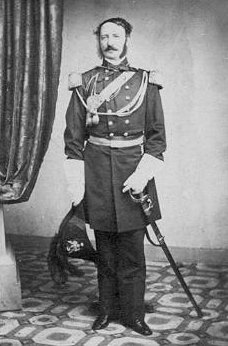
- Born: John Bankhead Magruder; May 1, 1807; Port Royal, Virginia, US
- Died: February 18, 1871 (aged 63); Houston, Texas, US
- Burial place: Episcopal Cemetery, Galveston, Texas, U.S.
- Military career
- Allegiance: United States; Confederate States; Second Mexican Empire
- Branch: United States Army; Confederate States Army
- Service years: 1830–1861 (U.S. Army); 1861–1865 (Confederate Army)
- Rank: Captain; Bvt. Lieutenant Colonel (USA); Major General (CSA)
- Nickname: "Prince John"
- Commands: Army of the Peninsula; Magruder's Division; District of Texas, New Mexico, and Arizona; Department of Arkansas
- Conflicts: Second Seminole War; Mexican–American War; American Civil War: Peninsula Campaign; Siege of Yorktown; Seven Days Battles; Battle of Galveston
- Other work: Lawyer; lecturer

John Bankhead Magruder (May 1, 1807 (Note: Magruder and his father both stated that he was born on May 1, 1807, but the Dictionary of American Biography erroneously stated, and Douglas Southall Freeman repeated, that he was born on August 15, 1810.) – February 18, 1871) often referred to as "Prince John Magruder", was an American and Confederate military officer. A graduate of West Point, Magruder served with distinction during the Mexican–American War (1846–1848) and was a prominent Confederate Army general during the American Civil War (1861–1865). As a major general, he received recognition for delaying the advance of Maj. Gen. George B. McClellan's Army of the Potomac, during the 1862 Peninsula Campaign, as well as recapturing Galveston, Texas the following year.

When the Civil War began in 1861, Magruder left the Union Army to accept a commission in the Confederacy. As commander of the Army of the Peninsula, he fortified the Virginia Peninsula and won the Battle of Big Bethel. In the Peninsula Campaign, he stalled McClellan's Army of the Potomac outside Yorktown, allowing Maj. Gen. Joseph E. Johnston to arrive with reinforcements, organize a retreat, and defend the Confederate capital, Richmond. Magruder was criticized for his leadership in battles at Savage's Station and Malvern Hill during the Seven Days Battles. He spent the remainder of the war administering the District of Texas, New Mexico, and Arizona and the Department of Arkansas; in his tenure, Magruder lifted the naval blockade over Galveston and recaptured the city in 1863.

After surrendering the Trans-Mississippi Department in June 1865, Magruder fled to Mexico. He worked in an administrative role under Emperor Maximillian I before returning to the United States in 1867. In 1869, he embarked on a lecture tour, speaking on the Mexican monarchy. Magruder died in Houston in 1871.

== Early life and career ==
Magruder was born on May 1, 1807, in Port Royal, Virginia. He was the fifth child of ten, eight of whom lived past infancy. Magruder's father, Thomas, was from a family of Scottish plantation owners; on June 22, 1797, he married Elizabeth Bankhead, the eldest daughter of "noted millers" in Albemarle County. Thomas Magruder was an attorney and practiced in the Chancery Court of Fredericksburg, but he was negligent in his duties and a constant debtor. By 1820, he lost ownership of all his slaves, and his homestead was sold at public auction five years later. Thomas was eventually reduced to living on Elizabeth's property in Aberfoyle with his daughter Isabella, while his wife lived with their son Allan in Albemarle County.

John Magruder was not interested in the law but loved the idea of soldiering. His uncle James Bankhead, a military officer during the War of 1812, is assumed to have instilled in Magruder a fascination with combat, in large part because of the war stories that he and Colonel James Bankhead – Magruder's American Revolutionary War veteran grandfather – told. In 1825, on letters of recommendation from his father, uncle, and Virginian congressman Robert S. Garnett, Magruder was notified of his appointment to West Point where he was to report a year later. He spent one semester at the University of Virginia in the interim.

At West Point, Magruder was a hyperactive and ambitious cadet who was often at odds with superintendent Sylvanus Thayer's regulations. His closest friends were William N. Pendleton and Alexander J. Swift; the former was later a Confederate officer and the latter distinguished himself as top of Magruder's class. He graduated in 1830, fifteenth in his class of 42 cadets, and was commissioned as a brevet second lieutenant in the 7th Infantry Regiment.

Magruder spent most of his furlough in the company of 20 year-old Henrietta von Kapff (March 27, 1810 – January 1, 1884), the wealthy daughter of businessman Johann von Kapff.

Magruder's family occasionally traveled with Magruder during his various assignments but, because of the unfavorable conditions in the various remote locales, Henrietta found it more practical to live in Baltimore where she could raise their children and stay close to her business interests. Thereafter, Magruder infrequently spent time with his family; he last saw them as he tended to Isabella during an illness that led to her death in 1869. Despite his absences, close family friends noted that Henrietta remained "in love with [her husband] to an uncommon degree".

=== U.S. Army career ===
On a request to the United States Department of War, Magruder arranged a transfer to the 1st Artillery with Albert Miller Lea, a correspondent from West Point, to stay close to Henrietta. Biographer Thomas M. Settles described the lieutenant as a great favorite among his men—‌"always charming, frivolous at times, but intelligent and obviously well read". Known as "Prince John", a resplendently uniformed man with a theatrical manner, Magruder attained a reputation for his social grace and etiquette.

The 1830s for Magruder, however, were largely regulated to garrison duty in North Carolina, Maryland, and Florida; the uneventful aspects of these assignments granted him time to study law and pass the bar examination. By 1844, Magruder, working as a recruitment officer, was dissatisfied with military service. The adverse northern climate found at his latest post, the Hancock Barracks in Maine, contributed to a bronchial infection, he had seen no military action, and felt slighted by the lack of recognition for organizing crucial supplies during the Second Seminole War.

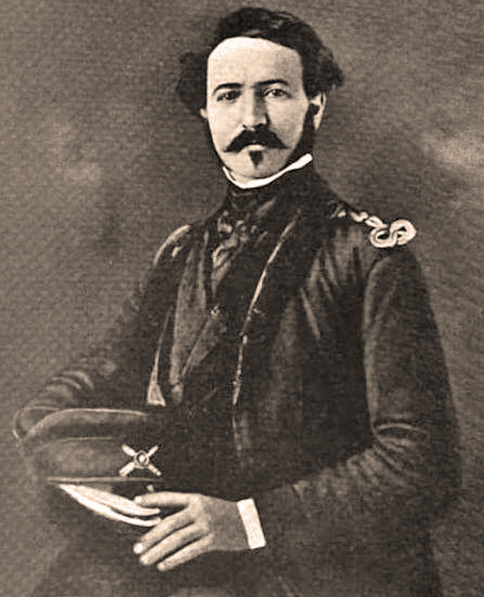
Magruder in an 1848 painting

In August 1845, Magruder volunteered for assignment in Corpus Christi, Texas, to join General Zachary Taylor's army there, occupying the former republic; the US was on the verge of war with Mexico over the question of annexation. After hostilities opened on April 25, 1846, Magruder first saw combat at the Battle of Palo Alto, 14 days later. On April 18, 1847, Magruder served with "zeal and ability", in General Winfield Scott's expedition, under heavy fire and turned Mexican artillery against them at Cerro Gordo, for which he was praised by his superiors and brevetted to major.

By September 12, US forces had begun targeting Chapultepec, in one of a series of engagements in the Battle of Mexico City. Magruder, lightly wounded, ordered the first shots in the early morning on the 13th and offered pursuit, despite superior Mexican numbers, to capture the Anzures, Veronica, and Belen intersection—a crucial crossroads that would block efforts by General Santa Anna to relieve the palace.

From the conflict in Mexico, Magruder learned the value of deceiving and flanking forces outnumbering his own. He also saw the war as demonstrating "the science of artillery is continually advancing", and submitted a detailed plan for separating the light artillery from "ordnance, field, and sea coast artillery"—in theory, "resulting in an enlightened division of labor" and specialization; however, in a post-war cost-cutting decision, the War Department rejected the proposal and ordered Magruder's men to serve as foot soldiers.

In 1850, Magruder was assigned to command the post in San Diego, California, where for a time he was also "a land speculator, lawyer, saloon owner, railroad president, and one of California's most celebrated duelists". In the late 1850s Magruder took Rancho Jamacha from Apolinaria Lorenzana. Years later in May 1857, while stationed at Fort Adams, his company was remounted as a light artillery battery. Historian Edward A. Pollard noted that Magruder was recognized as one of the lead artillerists in the army: "It was in the rapid and effective management of field-pieces, and the combinations with which they were applied to accomplish immediate and important results, that his genius shone"; Magruder's experience helped him convince the War Department in 1860 to accept a revised version of his logistics plan, and fund an expedition to observe European artillery tactics.

== Civil War ==
At the onset of the Civil War Magruder was posted in Washington, D.C. on the side of the Union. However, Magruder, whose loyalties were with his home state of Virginia, resigned his commission in the army four days after the state seceded on April 17, 1861, to join the Confederate States of America (CSA); subsequently, Governor John Letcher appointed him to colonel in the Confederate Army. His superiors—perhaps impressed by his detailed inventory of Richmond's defenses—placed Magruder in command of forces, soon officially termed the Army of the Peninsula, on the Virginia Peninsula, east of Richmond where the city seemed most vulnerable to Union attack.

Immediately after establishing his headquarters at Yorktown, Magruder surveyed the region and found the circumstances favorable: the marshy terrain, dense undergrowth, and watercourses led him to surmise that a successful defense of the Peninsula was plausible. He ordered the construction of three fortified lines to counter mounting Union forces under the command of Maj. Gen. Benjamin Franklin Butler at Fort Monroe.

On May 27, Butler sent a force 8 miles (13 km) north to occupy the lightly defended town of Newport News and expanded Camp Hamilton, established in the adjacent town of Hampton. Magruder, seeking to delay his opponent while awaiting men and supplies, prepared a well-defended advanced outpost at Big and Little Bethel just 8 miles (13 km) from Union camp at Newport News to goad Butler into a premature attack; Butler complied and suffered a defeat in the Battle of Big Bethel on June 10. Civilian intelligence reports and a friendly fire incident during the night exposed the position of Butler's troops whose initial advance and subsequent thrusts were thwarted despite a Confederate disadvantage of manpower.

The praise for Magruder following Big Bethel far superseded its tactical importance but it nonetheless had a profound psychological impact. His victory reaffirmed the belief of many southerners in the Confederate cause, and Civil War historian Douglas Southall Freeman wrote Magruder was one of its earliest heroes—"second only to Beauregard in the esteem of the Confederacy" prior to the Seven Days Battles. By August 1861, he rose to the rank of major general.

=== Peninsula Campaign ===
==== Defending the peninsula ====
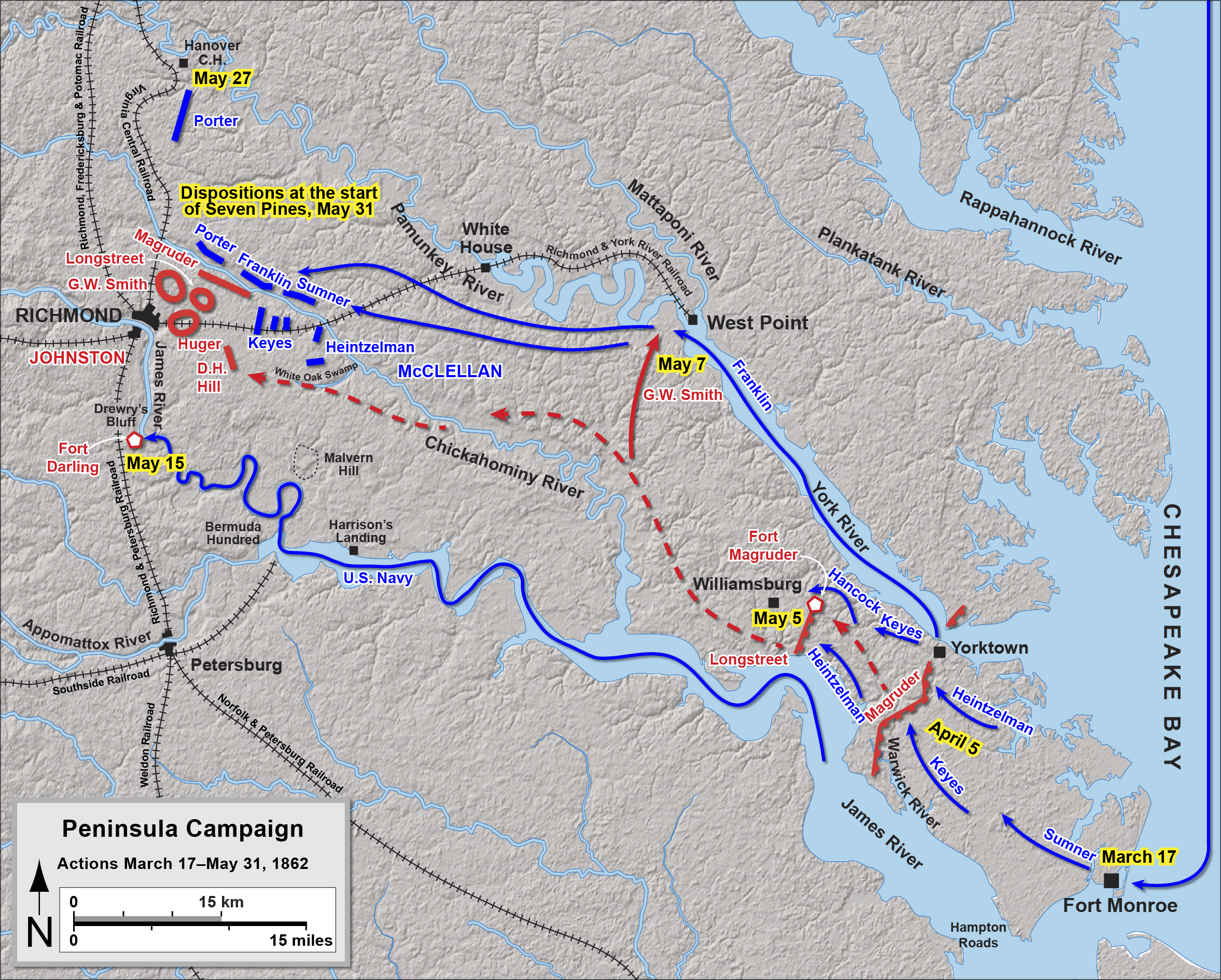
A map of events up to the Battle of Seven Pines. Magruder held the Warwick Line until General Johnston's arrival on April 17, 1862. Confederate Union

The victory of the Confederates at the First Battle of Bull Run on July 21, 1861, had paralyzed Union forces there for the remainder of the year, and presented the Confederate government time to consolidate its manpower. With the new year, preparations for the Union campaign of 1862 were urged forward by the Federal government, impatient for an advance on Richmond. Following the withdrawal of the Army of Northern Virginia, under Maj. Gen. Joseph E. Johnston, south of the Rappahannock River, Maj. Gen. George B. McClellan revised plans for the spring offensive. As part of his Peninsula Campaign, McClellan ordered his army—the Army of the Potomac—to disembark for Fort Monroe from Alexandria, Virginia, and Annapolis, Maryland, on March 17, 1862. McClellan sought to turn on Johnston's position and advance toward Richmond before the Confederates could readily defend their capital.

As McClellan's plans were gradually revealed to the Confederates, the mass of Johnston's army was ordered to the Peninsula by early April. Magruder's Army of the Peninsula—about 13,600 men—was tasked with delaying McClellan's 121,500-man force. Finding that his advanced line required more force than was at his command, Magruder fell back behind the Warwick River to his secondary position, the Warwick Line. He described his position:

Yorktown and redoubts Nos. 4 and 5, united by long curtains and flanked by rifle-pits, form the left of the line, until at the commencement of the military road it reaches the Warwick River, here a sluggish and boggy stream, twenty or thirty yards wide, and running a dense wood fringes by swamps. Along this river are five dams–one at Wynne's Mill, one at Lee's Mill, and three constructed by myself. The effect of these dams is to back up the water along the course of the river, so that for nearly three fourths of its distance its passage is impractical.

Two garrisons, amounting to 6,000 men, were stationed at Gloucester Point and Mulberry Island with heavy artillery to block Union passage of the York and James Rivers.

The Army of the Potomac marched forward with four divisions and cavalry—about 58,000 men—in two columns under Brigadier Generals Samuel Heintzelman and Erasmus Keyes on April 4. The following day, downpours bogged down the march. As Union forces emerged from patches of woods on Magruder's right flank and towards Lee's Mill, artillery and rifle fire erupted to repel Keyes's advance. Heintzelman was also brought to a halt by Yorktown's defensive works. Magruder's tactics—the constant marching of his forces and sporadic artillery barrages—created the illusion of a much larger military presence and persuaded McClellan to call for a siege of Yorktown. His only attempt to break Magruder's line, at Dam No. One on April 16, was repelled after the 3rd Vermont Infantry briefly held rifle-pits on the West side of the Warwick.

A day later, Johnston arrived and superseded Magruder in command; reinforcements increased the Confederates' presence on the Peninsula to 56,600 men. By April 27, Johnston learned that the Union's batteries would be prepared in five or six days, and he therefore elected to withdraw for Richmond, much to Magruder's disappointment. The retreat on the night of May 3 came at a high cost—Johnston was forced to leave behind artillery pieces and ammunition.

==== Williamsburg and Seven Pines ====
Magruder led his 17,300-man division in retreat on Lee's Mill Road toward Williamsburg. On arrival, he received a leave of absence from Johnston to seek medical treatment at Westover; Maj. Gen. David Rumph Jones replaced Magruder in command. At Magruder's instruction, an earthen redoubt—pridefully named Fort Magruder—was constructed in the winter of 1861 to defend the junction of the Yorktown and Lee's Mill roads in front of Williamsburg. Thirteen smaller redoubts also extended from Queen's Creek to the north and College Creek in the south. The Union artillerist Charles S. Wainwright termed the location a "very ugly place to attack", a sentiment shared by many officers.

In his memoirs, President Jefferson Davis wrote Magruder's absence from the Battle of Williamsburg on May 5 was regrettable, "as it appears that the positions of the redoubts he had constructed were not all known to the commanding General [Johnston], and some of them being unoccupied were seized by the enemy". Nonetheless, the results of the engagement were advantageous to the Confederates. By checking the Union's pursuit at Williamsburg, Johnston's retreat from the Peninsula continued without molestation.

Magruder rejoined his men at Bottom's Bridge, 12 miles east of Richmond, on May 9 and reassumed command from Jones. His division, as well as others in the Army of Northern Virginia, was ordered to retreat on May 15 southwest across the Chickahominy River in preparation for the defense of Richmond. On May 31, Johnston massed the divisions of Major Generals James Longstreet, D. H. Hill, and Benjamin Huger as part of a bold offensive toward Seven Pines, which aimed at isolating two Union corps south of the Chickahominy and overwhelming them. Magruder's men, held in reserve, guarded the main force's left flank yet saw no action during the two-day battle. Despite inflicting heavy casualties in the first day, "the opportunity was lost by hesitation and disjointed action", resulting in another inconclusive battle.

==== The Seven Days ====
After Johnston suffered a chest wound on May 31, the command of the Army of Northern Virginia fell to Maj. Gen. G. W. Smith. A day later, Smith too was relieved of the position by President Davis who then appointed General Robert E. Lee. Lee hastened forward his plans for an attack on McClellan's right flank, finding his left heavily fortified following Seven Pines and "injudicious, if not impracticable" for an assault. Lee's objectives—by assuming the offensive—were to avoid allowing Richmond to fall under siege and to turn on Brig. Gen. Fitz John Porter's Fifth Corps near Mechanicsville, forcing McClellan to defend his supply lines and communications. Simultaneously, Magruder and Huger guarded the capital from Union forces south of the Chickahominy.

Though McClellan's subordinates urged for reinforcements north of the Chickahominy following the Battle of Mechanicsville, McClellan was alarmed by threatening troop movements organized by Magruder, who revived the tactics that deceived Union forces at Yorktown. On June 27, while the Battle of Gaines's Mill was occurring north of the Chickahominy, Magruder directed the brigade of Brig. Gen. Robert Toombs to conduct reconnaissance at James Garnett farm. A minor skirmish, on Toombs's orders, resulted at dusk with Brig. Gen. Winfield Scott Hancock's forces. In consequence of confusion of commands, only two regiments engaged, and Magruder countermanded the attack as soon as he was informed.

Lee, having ascertained by the night of June 28 that McClellan was in retreat, ordered Magruder the next day in immediate pursuit along the Williamsburg Road and York River Railroad. Magruder played a passive role, having been informed by Lee that Jackson would help "push the pursuit vigorously". Without Jackson or reinforcements from Huger, Magruder cautiously engaged at Savage's Station with the Union's rear guard, "satisfied just to maintain the fight and position" against a force that outnumbered his own nearly 2-to-1, and concluded fighting with no significant outcome. Late that evening Lee reprimanded him: "I regret very much that you made so little progress today in the pursuit of the enemy. In order to reap the benefits of our victory the pursuit should be most vigorous. I must urge you then to press on his rear rapidly and steadily".

As the Confederates continued their pursuit on June 30, poor coordination and miscommunication cost Magruder valuable time while McClellan repositioned his troops. Magruder's division was held in reserve at Glendale. By the afternoon, he was ordered to unite with Maj. Gen. Theophilus H. Holmes who was engaging the enemy at Malvern Hill. He arrived too late—‌the belated orders kept Magruder out of action and exhausted his troops. In the Battle of Malvern Hill on July 1, Lee resumed the offensive and assigned Magruder, Jackson, and Huger to lead the attack. Though Jackson and Huger's forces arrived by midday, "poor guides and poorer maps" set Magruder marching in the wrong direction and delayed his arrival by three hours. He rode ahead of his forces, confused to the situation. Lee gave new orders for Magruder and his aide A. G. Dickinson took note of them: "General Lee expects you to advance rapidly. He says it is reported the enemy is getting off. Press forward your whole line ...". Thus, Magruder led charges on Malvern Hill, initially with brigades under Huger's command; he impatiently rushed his straggling men into the battle as they arrived to the field, failing to break through the Union's defensive works.

As accounts of Malvern Hill accumulated, Magruder was charged with being "under the intoxicating influence of ardent spirits", but Settles calls this claim "unsubstantiated" and "simultaneously the most damaging" to Magruder's reputation. Lee never lent support to charges of intoxication or incompetency, dispelling the threat of Magruder's recall; President Davis reassigned Magruder to command the District of Texas, New Mexico, and Arizona on October 10.

=== District of Texas, New Mexico, and Arizona ===
Magruder's predecessor, Paul Octave Hébert, surrendered Galveston, Texas on October 9 in the face of a Union blockade under Captain William B. Renshaw. Shortly after his arrival Magruder drew up plans with naval captain Leon Smith to recapture the city against forces that enjoyed advantages in manpower and naval superiority. On December 31, Confederate men and artillery positioned themselves to fire at enemy vessels. An artillery duel ensued and Smith's two improvised cottonclad warships— the CS Bayou City and CS Neptune—arrived at daybreak on January 1, 1863, to open a second front on the Union fleet. The Bayou City rammed and captured the USS Harriet Lane, prompting a three-hour truce to allow Renshaw to agree to terms of surrender. Renshaw, however, died while scuttling his flagship, the USS Westfield, and the remainder of the fleet fled from the harbor. The unlikely victory lifted the blockade and captured two Union barques and a schooner at the cost of only 26 casualties.

With Galveston in Confederate hands, Magruder retired to his headquarters in Houston on February 13 to attend to administrative duties. He attempted unsuccessfully to revise the cotton contract system, and soldiers of the Trans-Mississippi Department suffered from lack of provisions. Magruder strenuously enforced the draft, commanders in subdistricts held dictatorial powers, and he occasionally suspended habeas corpus; commander of the Trans-Mississippi Department Edmund Kirby Smith opined that Magruder had an "utter disregard for the law".

During his tenure, east Texas was under constant threat from Union forces under Maj. Gen. Nathaniel P. Banks; Banks' failed invasion of Red River Valley in 1864 prompted an order from his superior, Ulysses S. Grant, to abandon efforts to attack the Gulf Coast. In September 1864, Magruder led the Department of Arkansas until he returned to his previous position in March 1865.

Despite Lee's surrender at Appomattox on April 9, Magruder and Smith urged their men to continue the struggle. Having exhausted all options, on June 2 the two generals signed the Canby-Buckner Convention aboard the USS Fort Jackson.

== Later years ==
Though Confederate officers were not under threat of detainment, Magruder joined the Confederate exodus to Mexico. Magruder stayed in the country for 17 months, from July 1865 to November 1866. In 1866, Napoleon III's troop withdrawal from Mexico crippled the emperorship of Maximilian I of Mexico. Before fleeing to Havana, he appealed to Maximillian to escape the country; the Emperor refused to abandon his followers, fell under siege in Querétaro, and was executed on June 19, 1867.

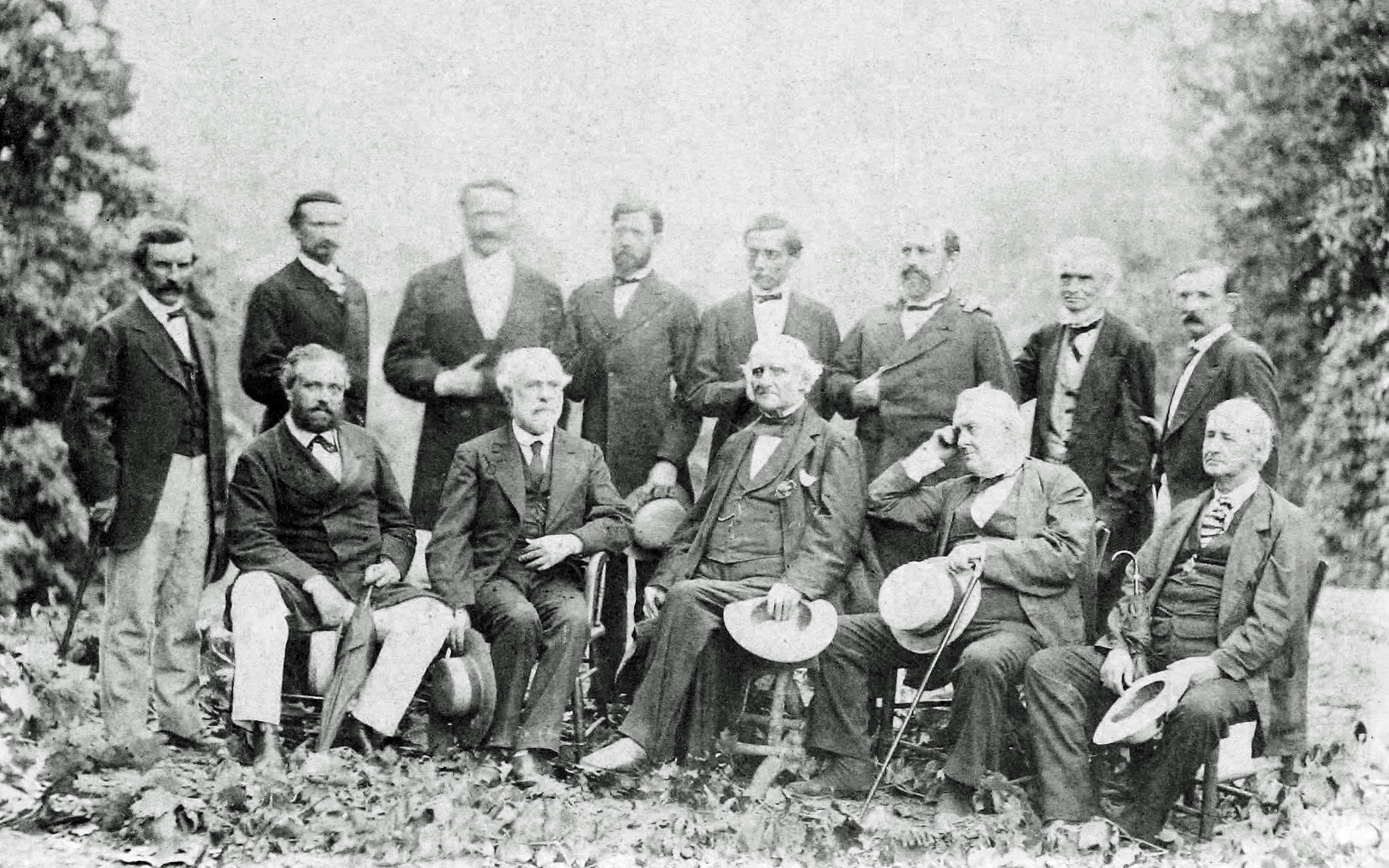
Magruder—standing top row, third from left—with Robert E. Lee and other Confederate officers in 1869

In early 1867, Magruder returned to the United States with little money and no prospects for employment. He arrived in New York City to establish a law practice, yet he was constantly on the move in the final years of his life.

In 1869, Magruder was invited to lecture in New Orleans on Mexican politics, speaking "kindly of the well-intentioned emperor [Maximillian I] and his ambitious wife and judged that they were genuinely concerned about the welfare of Mexico". A "natural at the podium", Magruder's lectures were well-attended in New Orleans, Baltimore, Galveston, and elsewhere. After a group of wealthy Texan admirers pledged to purchase him a plantation, Magruder traveled to Galveston in April 1870—to his disappointment, the offer never materialized.

Weakened by failing health, Magruder moved into the Hutchins House, a luxurious hotel in Houston.

On February 18, 1871, "Magruder, having been unwell for several days, suffering from disease of the heart, breathed his last about 3 o'clock Saturday morning at the Hutchins House". He was buried in Houston's Episcopal cemetery. Soon after his death, the citizens of Galveston formed a committee to have Magruder's remains moved to the island. On January 10, 1876, his body was reinterred in Galveston's Episcopal cemetery and a monument was erected there in 1894.

== Legacy ==
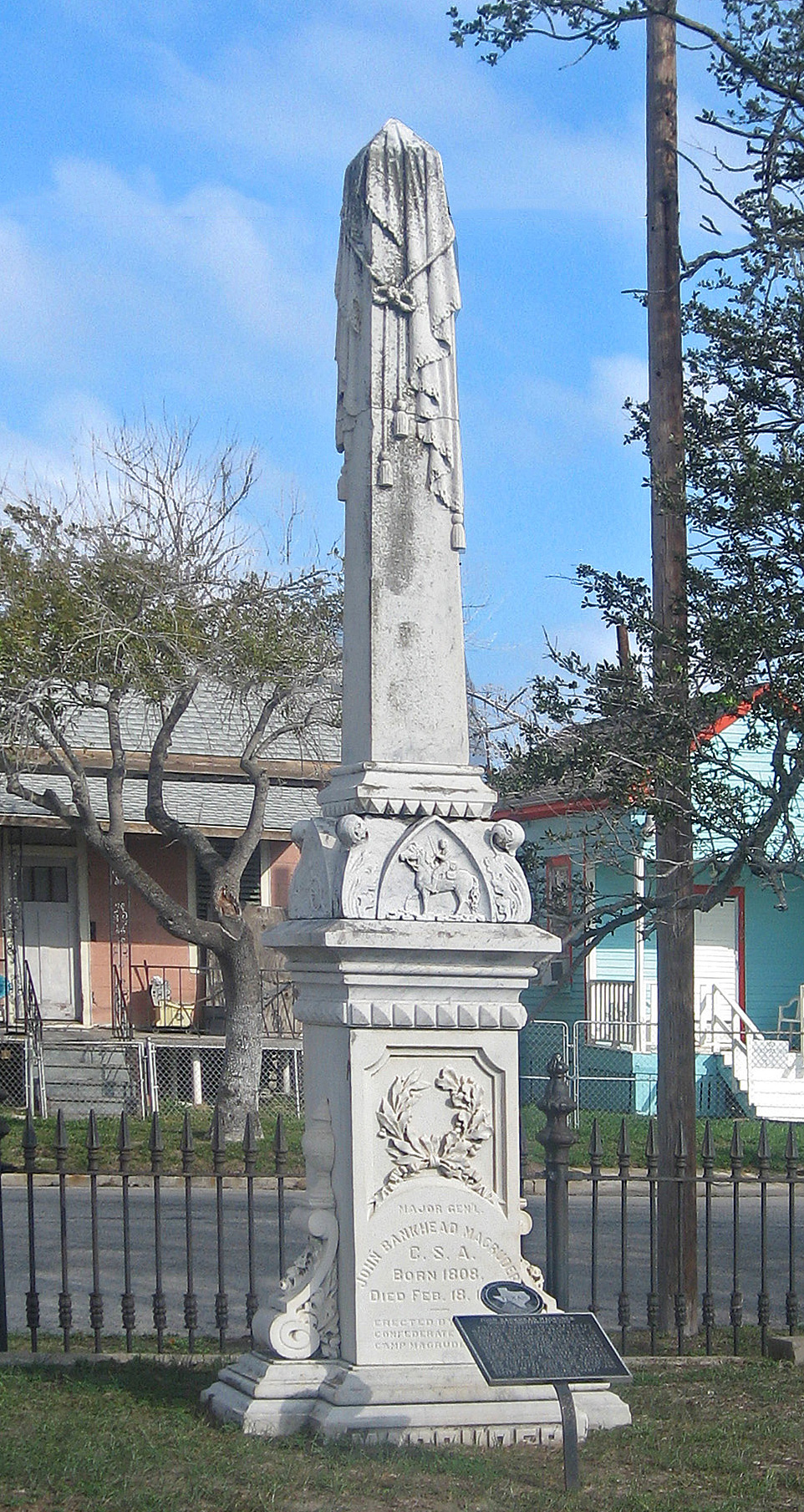
John Bankhead Magruder Monument

The third highest-ranking officer in the Army of the Northern Virginia, Magruder never published any memoirs. He cultivated a flamboyant, distinctive image and personality in the belief that it would inspire his troops. His affinity for pomp and showmanship often became a topic of discussion among his men and wings of the officer corps. Likewise, his extravagant social life led to many, largely unfounded, rumors of drunkenness on duty. As a leader, Magruder was an "experienced artillery officer of shrewd intelligence", developed an ability to deliver charismatic speeches, and was quick to credit his men for his successes.

At a time when Richmond was vulnerable to attack, Magruder's command of the Army of the Peninsula in April and May 1862 was, according to Settles, his "greatest contribution to the Confederacy". Later, as he reflected in his 1874 book Narrative of Military Operations, Johnston wrote Magruder's efforts on the Virginia Peninsula "saved Richmond and gave the Confederate government time to swell that officer's handful to an army".

In nineteenth century assessments of Confederate leadership, it was frequently asserted that Magruder's poor field command during the Seven Days campaign cost the Confederacy a decisive victory—particularly at Malvern Hill—or even that Magruder's judgement allowed McClellan's army to escape. According to historian Stephen W. Sears, however, Magruder's "peculiar talent for accomplishing what he did in the trench lines at Yorktown"—a talent which "probably none other army's generals had"—contributed greatly to delivering Richmond from siege.
