= USS Westfield =

Gunboat of the United States Navy

History

United States
- Name: USS Westfield
- Acquired: by purchase, 22 November 1861
- Commissioned: January 1862
- Fate: Destroyed to prevent capture, 1 January 1863

General characteristics
- Type: Steam gunboat
- Displacement: 822 long tons (835 t)
- Length: 215 ft (66 m)
- Beam: 35 ft (11 m)
- Draft: 13 ft 6 in (4.11 m)
- Propulsion: Steam engine
- Armament: 1 × 100-pounder Parrott rifle; 1 × 9 in (230 mm) Dahlgren smoothbore gun; 4 × 8 in (200 mm) Dahlgren smoothbore guns

USS Westfield was a sidewheel steam ferryboat in the United States Navy during the American Civil War.

Westfield was purchased by the Navy from Cornelius Vanderbilt on 22 November 1861; outfitted at Jeremiah Simonson's shipyard in Brooklyn, New York City; and commissioned in January 1862, Commander William B. Renshaw in command.

== Service history ==
Westfield departed New York on 22 February 1862, bound for Key West, Florida, to join Comdr. David Dixon Porter's Mortar Flotilla. That unit, however, departed Key West on 3 March before Westfield's arrival. She, therefore, did not join the flotilla until her arrival at the Passes of the Mississippi River on 18 March. For the next three weeks, she assisted Mississippi and Pensacola in their efforts to cross the bar at Pass an Outre and enter the Mississippi River.

That mission finally succeeded on 8 April 1862, and Westfield began duty covering a coastal survey party developing more precise maps of the lower Mississippi for the assault on Forts Jackson and St. Philip. On 13 April 1862, she received orders to proceed upriver and engage two Confederate gunboats. After two shots from her Parrott rifle, the two Confederate ships retired to the protection of the guns of Fort Jackson where they joined six other Confederate gunboats. Undaunted, Westfield closed the range and opened fire once more. That brief cannonade broke the shaft of CSS Defiance and damaged her so severely that her crew later had to abandon and sink her.

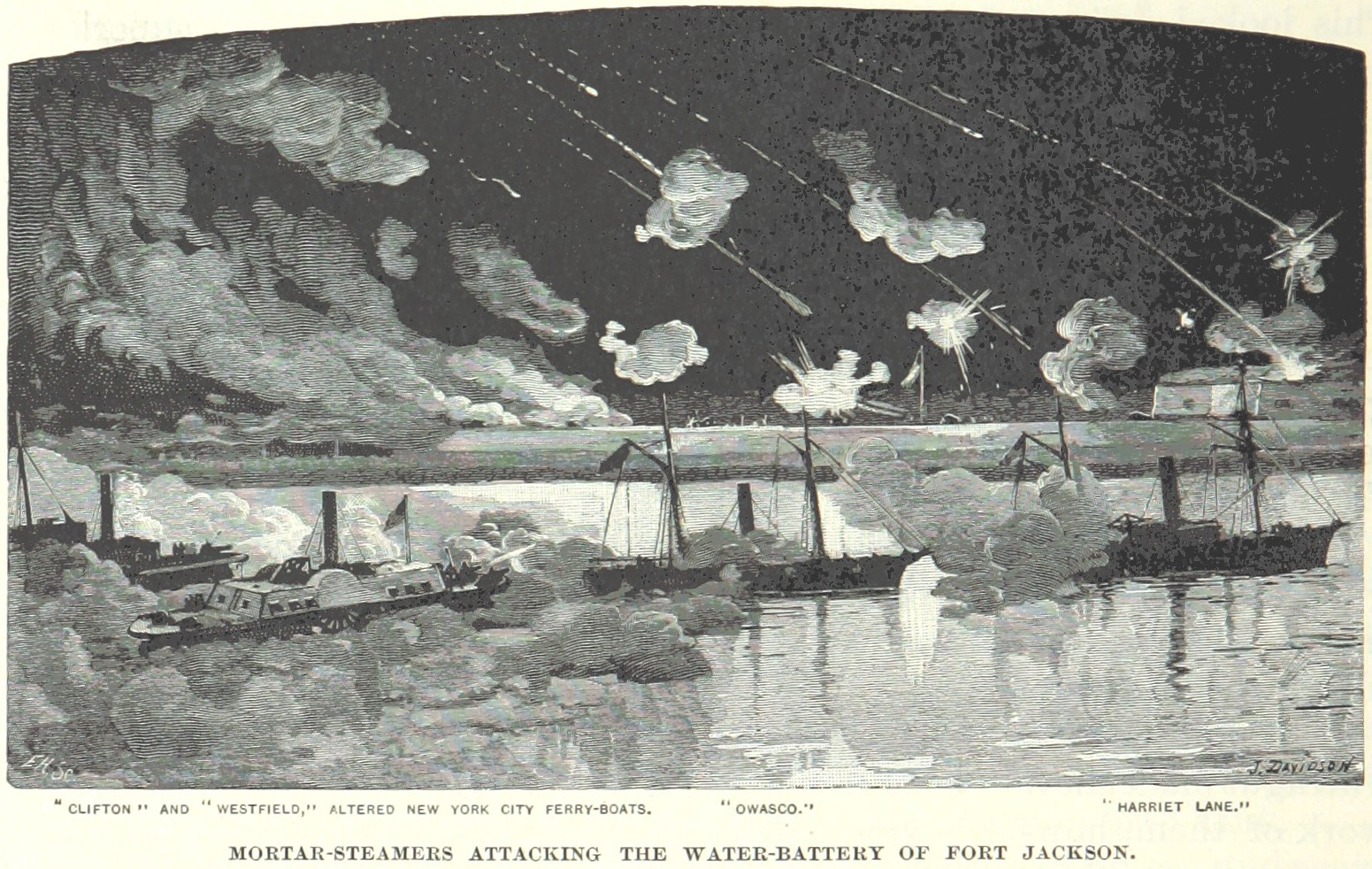
Westfield (second from left) bombards Fort Jackson with the other mortar steamers

Between 14 April and 24 April 1862, she supported Porter's Mortar Flotilla during the bombardment of the two Confederate forts in preparation for Flag Officer David Farragut's run between them to New Orleans, Louisiana. That event occurred on 24 April 1862, but Westfield did not participate directly. Rather, she remained with the mortar boats and continued to support them and supply ammunition. Early in the summer of 1862, Westfield moved upriver with the Mortar Flotilla – to a point just below Vicksburg, Mississippi. There she resumed her duties in support of the mortars during the first campaign against the Confederate stronghold.

Late in July and early in August 1862, the ship made her way back down the Mississippi via Baton Rouge and New Orleans to the Gulf of Mexico. She then took up duty blockading the coast of Texas as a unit of the West Gulf Blockading Squadron. On 4 October 1862, Westfield led a unit composed of Harriet Lane, Owasco, Clifton, and Henry Janes in a successful assault on the city of Galveston, Texas, which capitulated formally on 9 October 1862. She remained at Galveston until 1 January 1863 and was flagship of the six-ship U.S. Navy force there when, during the successful Confederate liberation of the city in the Battle of Galveston, she ran aground on a sandbar in Galveston Harbor while the Union ships were under attack by two Confederate States Army warships, the tugboat CS Neptune and the gunboat CS Bayou City. She was blown up to forestall her almost certain capture by Confederate forces. Her commanding officer, Commander William B. Renshaw (1816–1863), who also was the commander of the U.S. Navy force off Galveston, and a boat crew died when the explosives detonated sooner than expected.

As of 2007, no other ship in the United States Navy has been named Westfield.

On 18 November 2009 the U.S. Army Corps of Engineers began several weeks of recovery operations to retrieve artifacts. Items recovered are destined for study at the Conservation Research Lab at Texas A&M University. Westfield's largest cannon, the 9-inch Dahlgren, was recovered along with five cannonballs from a depth of 47 ft near the merge point of the Texas City Ship Channel and the Houston Ship Channel. The Dahlgren cannon is said to be the centerpiece of the recovered artifacts, which were brought to College Station and will be kept at the Conservation Research Lab on Texas A&M's Riverside Campus. The cannon was placed in an electrolysis bath for up to two years to remove chlorides and preserve the metal, according to Donny Hamilton, head of the Texas A&M anthropology department. The cannon was moved to the Texas City Museum, where it will be housed for the foreseeable future. The Museum dedicated the USS Westfield Exhibit 2 March 2017.

Once the archaeology project completes, the US Army Corps of Engineers begins a $71 million dredging effort of the waterway.

== See also ==
- Union Navy
- Union Blockade
