= Army of the Peninsula =

- Active: May 26, 1861–April 26, 1862
- Disbanded: Incorporated into Army of Northern Virginia April 26, 1862
- Country: Confederate States of America
- Branch: Confederate States Army
- Type: Field army
- Garrison/HQ: Yorktown, Virginia
- Nickname: Magruder's Army
- Engagements: Battle of Big Bethel

Commanders
- Notable commanders: John B. Magruder

The Army of the Peninsula or Magruder's Army was a Confederate army early in the American Civil War.

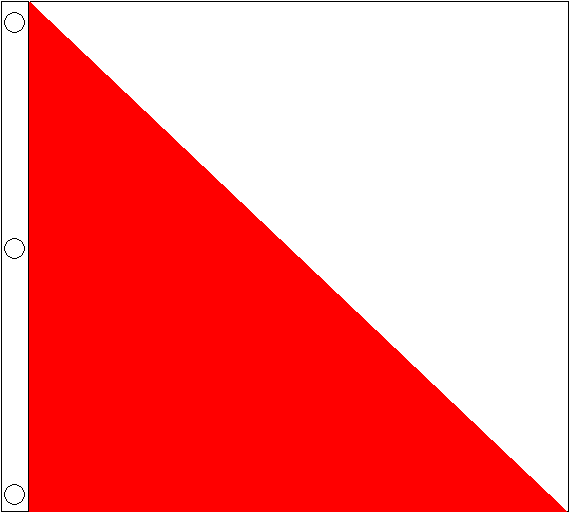
Flag of the Army of the Peninsula

In May 1861, Colonel John B. Magruder was assigned to command operations on the lower Virginia Peninsula with Yorktown as headquarters. The Confederate secretary of war LeRoy Pope Walker ordered the Department of the Peninsula into existence on May 26, and the military force was named for the department. Magruder fought a portion of his command to good effect at Big Bethel, an early Confederate victory.

By year's end, the force had swollen to 13,000 men, still commanded by Magruder, now major general. In April 1862 Magruder's army was incorporated into the right wing of the larger army of Joseph E. Johnston, preparing defenses against an expected attack by George B. McClellan in what would become the Peninsula campaign. While the army designation ceased to exist, Magruder's army's independence and initiative was instrumental in preventing McClellan from rapidly advancing on Richmond.
