= Joseph Nicholson (public official) =

18th century Maryland public official

Joseph Nicholson Jr. (died 1786) was a public official from Maryland during the American Revolution.

== Background ==
Nicholson Jr. was born to Colonel Joseph Nicholson in Kent County, Maryland. He studied law and later was elected Sheriff of Queen Anne's County from 1760-1763.

From 1776 to 1777 he served in the Council of Safety for the Eastern Shore. He was elected to the Second Continental Congress in 1777 but did not attend. He served as a member of the Maryland State Senate representing the Eastern Shore from 1776-1781.

On July 28, 1757, Nicholson married Elizabeth Hopper. They would have five children, including Joseph Hopper Nicholson, a U.S. congressman.

Nicholson died in 1786 in Queen Anne's County.
