= Richard Burn =

English legal writer

Richard Burn (1709 – 12 November 1785) was an English legal writer.

== Education and career ==
Burn was born in Winton, Kirkby Stephen, Westmorland. He matriculated at The Queen's College, Oxford in 1729. He was not awarded his B.A. until 1735, three years after he left the university to accept a position as schoolmaster at Kirkby Stephen in Westmorland. Burn then entered the Church of England, and in 1736 became vicar of Orton in Westmorland. He was a justice of the peace for the counties of Westmorland and Cumberland, and devoted himself to the study of law. In 1762, after Burn had attained notoriety as a legal scholar, the University of Oxford awarded him an honorary LL.D. He was appointed chancellor of the diocese of Carlisle in 1765, an office which he held until his death. He died, aged 86, in Orton.

== Writings ==
Burn's Justice of the Peace and Parish Officer, first published in 1755, was for many years the standard authority on the law relating to justices of the peace. It has passed through some 30 editions, half of which appeared after Burn's death. His Ecclesiastical Law (1760), a work of much research, was the foundation upon which were built many modern commentaries on ecclesiastical law.

Burn's other publications include: Digest of the Militia Laws (1760), History of the Poor Laws: with observations (1764), and A New Law Dictionary (2 vols., 1792). The last-named work, published after the author's death by his son, was an update of William Blackstone's Commentaries on the Laws of England.

Burn was a noted antiquarian. He collaborated with Joseph Nicolson to compile The History and Antiquities of the Counties of Westmorland and Cumberland, published in 1777. The two-volume work relates information concerning the families, customs, architecture, and political and religious history of the two counties, and continues to be of great interest to family and local historians.

== Personal life ==
In July 1736 Burn married 1736 Eleanor Nelson (d. October 1739) four days after the death of her father, who preceded Burn as incumbent of Orton. In August 1740 he married Anne (d. 1772), widow of John Kitchen of Cowper House, near Kendal. Their son John, born in 1744, published his father's New Law Dictionary 'continued to the present time' in 1792 and the 18th edition of The Justice of the Peace and Parish Officer (1797–1801).
