= Cottonclad warship =

American Civil War era vessels

Cottonclads were a classification of steam-powered warships where a wooden ship was protected from enemy fire by bales of cotton lining its sides. Cottonclads were prevalent during the American Civil War, particularly in the Confederate States Navy for riverine and coastal service, such as in the battles of Memphis, Galveston, and Sabine Pass. Confederate tactics generally had cottonclads, which were outgunned by Union warships, steam at full speed towards enemy vessels, relying on the cotton to absorb fire. Once they were within firing range, they would open fire, and, if possible, ram or board the enemy.

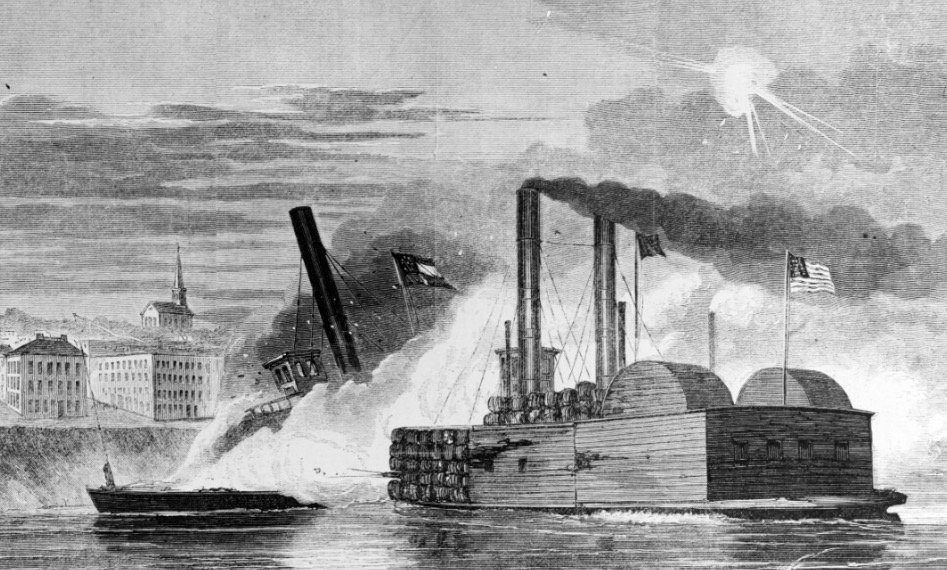
The Union Queen of the West, converted into a cottonclad via the placement of cotton bales as artillery-resistant armor, ramming the Confederate Vicksburg.

== Conversion ==
Around 1863, Confederate Commander John B. Magruder realized that Texas did not possess the funding and resources, such as iron mills, to produce impressive and potent vessels such as the ironclad CSS Virginia, thus inspiring the development of a new type of warship, later classified as a cottonclad warship. Cottonclads were various kinds of steamboats transformed into warships in places such as Buffalo Bayou near Houston. In this process, the upper deck, called the Texas deck, was removed. As a result, many of these ships developed "the rakish look of an ironclad ram, if not the potency."

Five-hundred-pound cotton bales were placed, on their sides, three bales high, with another row of bales lying flat behind the first row; these bales served as platforms for sharpshooters. The bales would be held with iron straps fastened to the bulwarks. To provide additional protection for the sharpshooters, heavy 14 x 14” timbers were fastened to the floor in the ship's hold; these extended through the boiler deck to form a breastwork. A typical sharpshooter force on a cottonclad would consist of about 100 men arranged behind their bales of cotton. A refurbished thirty-two-pound cannon was mounted on the bow. Gangplanks were then suspended from their upper decks; they could be dropped onto the decks of nearby ships for boarding by teams of soldiers called "horse marines" - they were usually cavalrymen whose horses had been left ashore.

Once protected by layers of both wood and cotton, the ships needed some way to fight back; they needed weapons. However, finding any heavy guns to place on the new cottonclads proved to be a difficult task. A motley of guns had to be scavenged for and affixed to the steamers, as no standard armament could be found. However, a lack of ammunition often forced these guns to be used purely as morale boosters for the men on board. The brunt of the offense had to be shifted over to the sharpshooters and rams on the tips of the ships. These rams would be built onto many of the newly converted cottonclads and consist of a 4-inch oak sheath covering a 1-inch layer of iron plating. The rams would be affixed to the ship's bow, extending below the water level. The cottonclad would steam at full power towards an enemy ship, and the ram would collide with the ship's hull, sinking or at least severely impairing the boat. The cotton bales would be compressed into the space between the double pine bulwarks.

Some of the vessels that were converted into cottonclads included the former mail packet Neptune, and others such as John F. Carr, Lucy Gwinn, Josiah Bell, Uncle Ben, Bayou City, Governor Moore, Stonewall Jackson, General Sterling Price, Little Rebel, General Bragg, and the General Beauregard.

Although retrofitting these ships into cottonclads took time, at the end of the work, what were once dainty river steamers were now turned into what one observer deemed as "savage looking gunboats."

== Cottonclads in battle ==
The cottonclads were now ready to deploy at Galveston after being converted into these makeshift battleships. Their mission was to retake the city from the Union forces, which now possessed several warships, including the USS Harriet Lane, USS Owasco, USS Corypheus, and USS Sachem, all anchored in Galveston Harbor.

Cottonclads fought larger, better-armed/armored Federal gunships by steaming directly at them, subsequently using their various offensive measures to take down the ship. The Federal ship would engage the cottonclad as soon as it was spotted, but the dense cotton bales absorbed most of the fire. Meanwhile, the cottonclad's smaller caliber cannon would begin firing at the Federal ship as soon as it was within the cannon's range, which was fairly limited. At an even closer range, sharpshooters behind the bales would produce a steady stream of fire at any enemies on the deck. Often, the sharpshooters' fire was so effective that the Federal crewmen, especially gun crews, ran for cover below the deck.

Once the more maneuverable cottonclad rammed or entangled the Federal warship, the ropes suspending the cottonclad's gangplanks above the enemy deck would be cut. The gangplanks would fall onto the enemy deck, and the awaiting "horse marines" would board the Federal ship, proceeding to kill or capture its crew. If possible, the captured ship would be towed back into shallow waters, where the cottonclad's crew would scavenge its cannons, weapons, and other provisions. If the captured ship could not be towed to safety, its prisoners were transferred to the cottonclad and the captured ship was burned to prevent it from being recaptured by the Federals.

Two cottonclads, CS Bayou City and CS Neptune, played key roles in the Confederate strategy at the Battle of Galveston, in which Confederate forces demanded the surrender of the important Texas port. Major General John Magruder equipped the two cottonclads with weapons and officers, appointing Capt. Leon Smith to utilize these ships in seizing the wharf. The cottonclads attacked from the rear of the Union squadron, resulting in the sinking of the CS Neptune as it attempted to ram the Union ship Harriet Lane. However, the Bayou City managed to board the Union vessel despite the immense damage it had taken during the battle, leading to the retreat of the remaining Union forces and the successful acquisition of Galveston for the Confederates.

However, in the end, every single one of the cottonclad warships was either sunk, burned, or captured by Union forces.

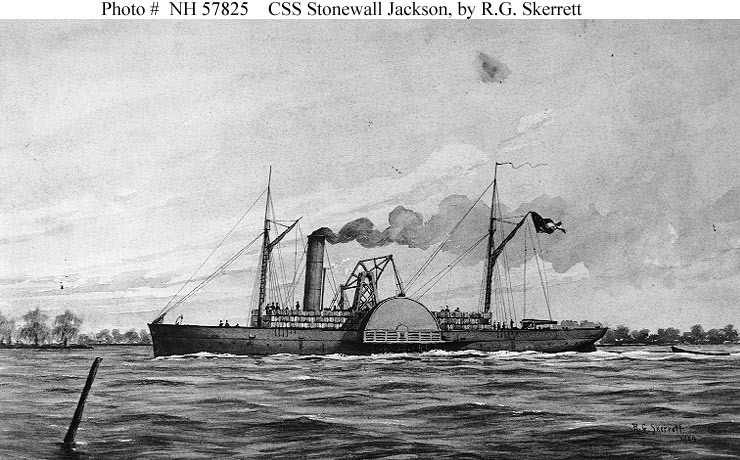
CSS Stonewall Jackson

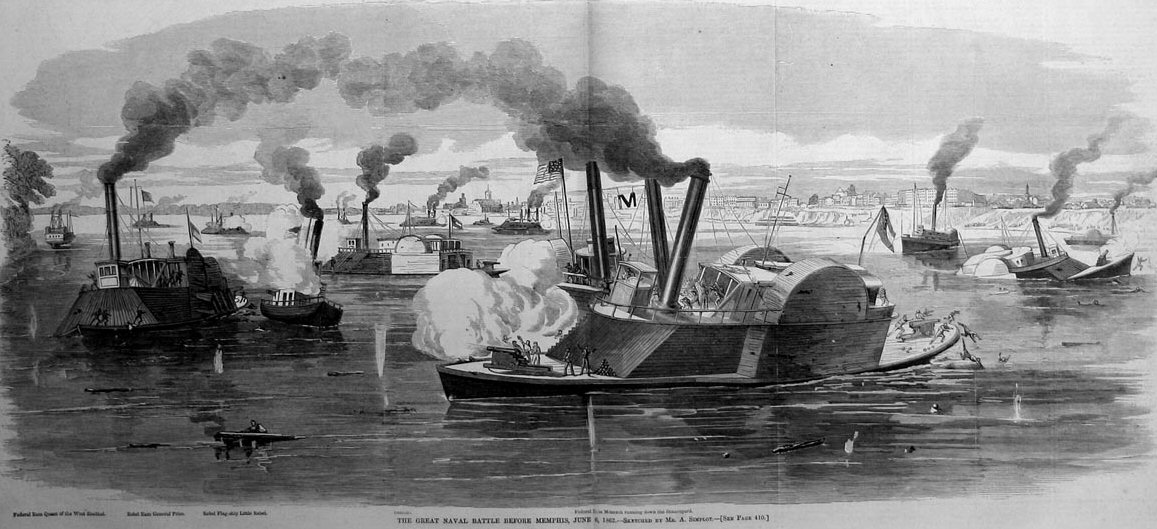
2nd from left CSS General Sterling Price; 3rd from left CSS Little Rebel; Center foreground USS Monarch ramming CSS Beauregard

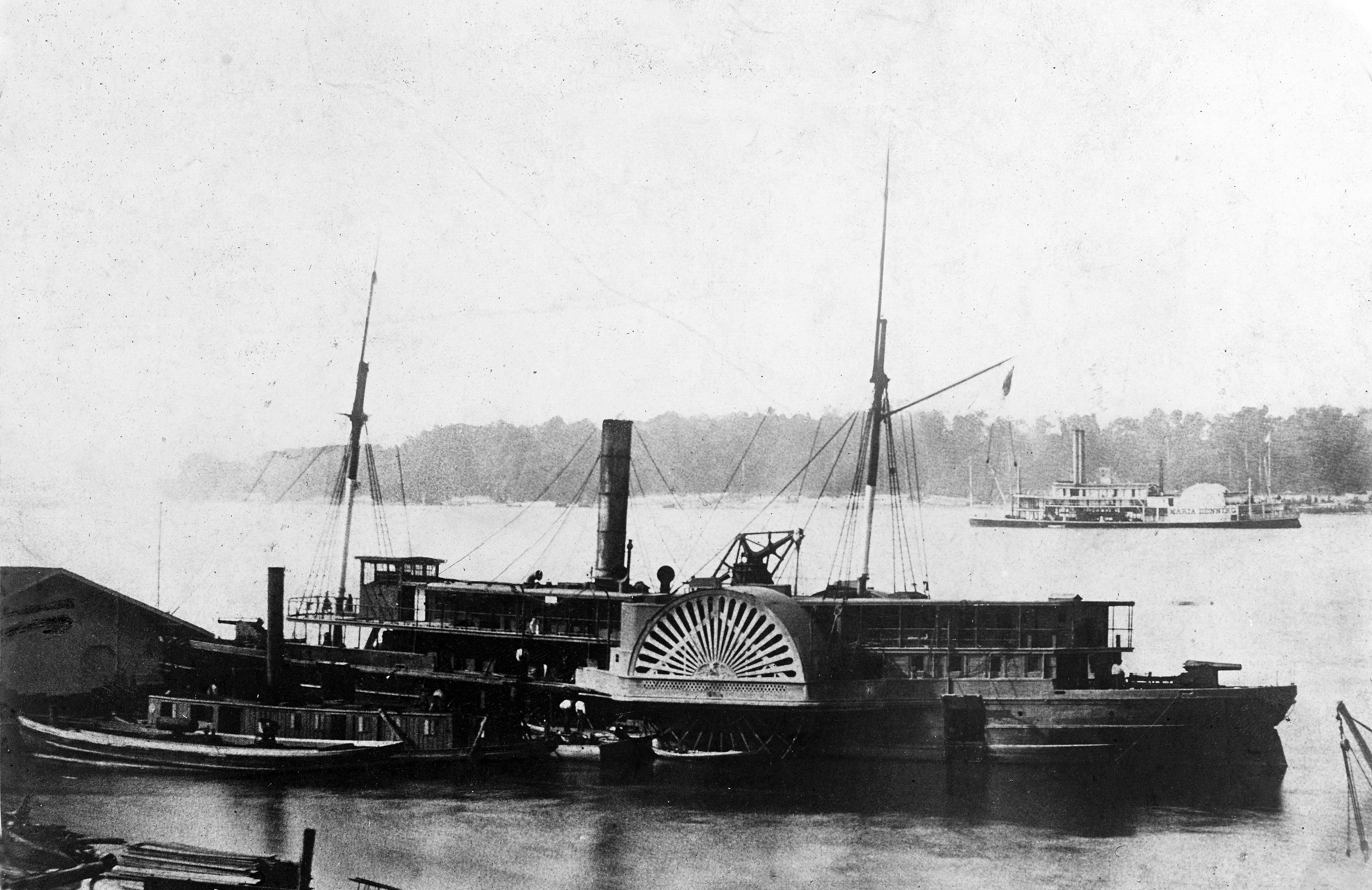
(Ex CSS) USS General Bragg, probably photographed at Cairo or Mound City, Illinois, circa 1862–63.

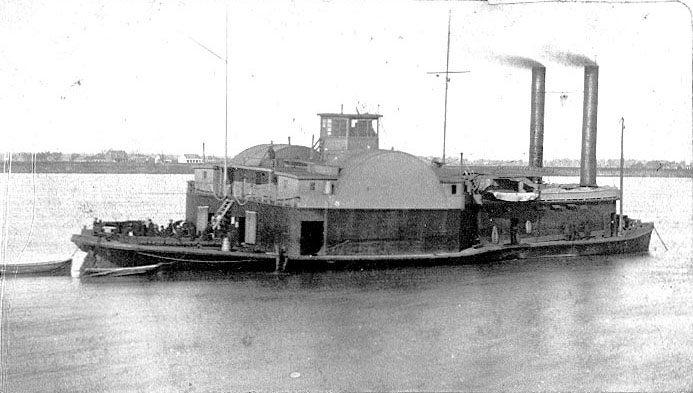
(Ex CSS) USS General Price off Baton Rouge, Louisiana, January 18, 1864

== See also ==
- Timberclad warship
- Ironclad warship
