= Battle of Galveston =

Battle of the American Civil War

Coordinates: 29.339536°N 94.767036°W

- Part of the Trans-Mississippi Theater of the American Civil War
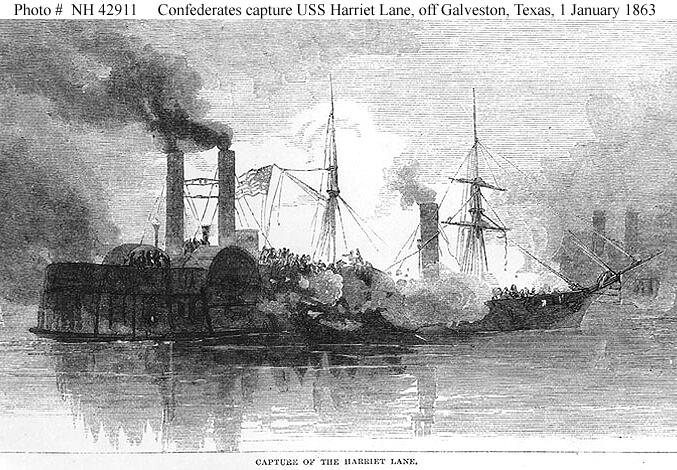
- CS Bayou City captures USS Harriet Lane during the Battle of Galveston
Date	January 1, 1863
Location	Galveston, Texas
Result	Confederate victory

Belligerents
United States	(Confederate States of America) Confederate States

Commanders and leaders
Isaac S. Burrell; William B. Renshaw †	John B. Magruder; Leon Smith

Units involved
West Gulf Blockading Squadron; 42nd Massachusetts Infantry	Department of Texas, New Mexico and Arizona; Texas Marine Department

Strength
6 gunboats Unknown infantry	2 cottonclad gunboats Unknown infantry

Casualties and losses
c. 420 captured 1 gunboat captured 1 gunboat destroyed	26 killed, 117 wounded

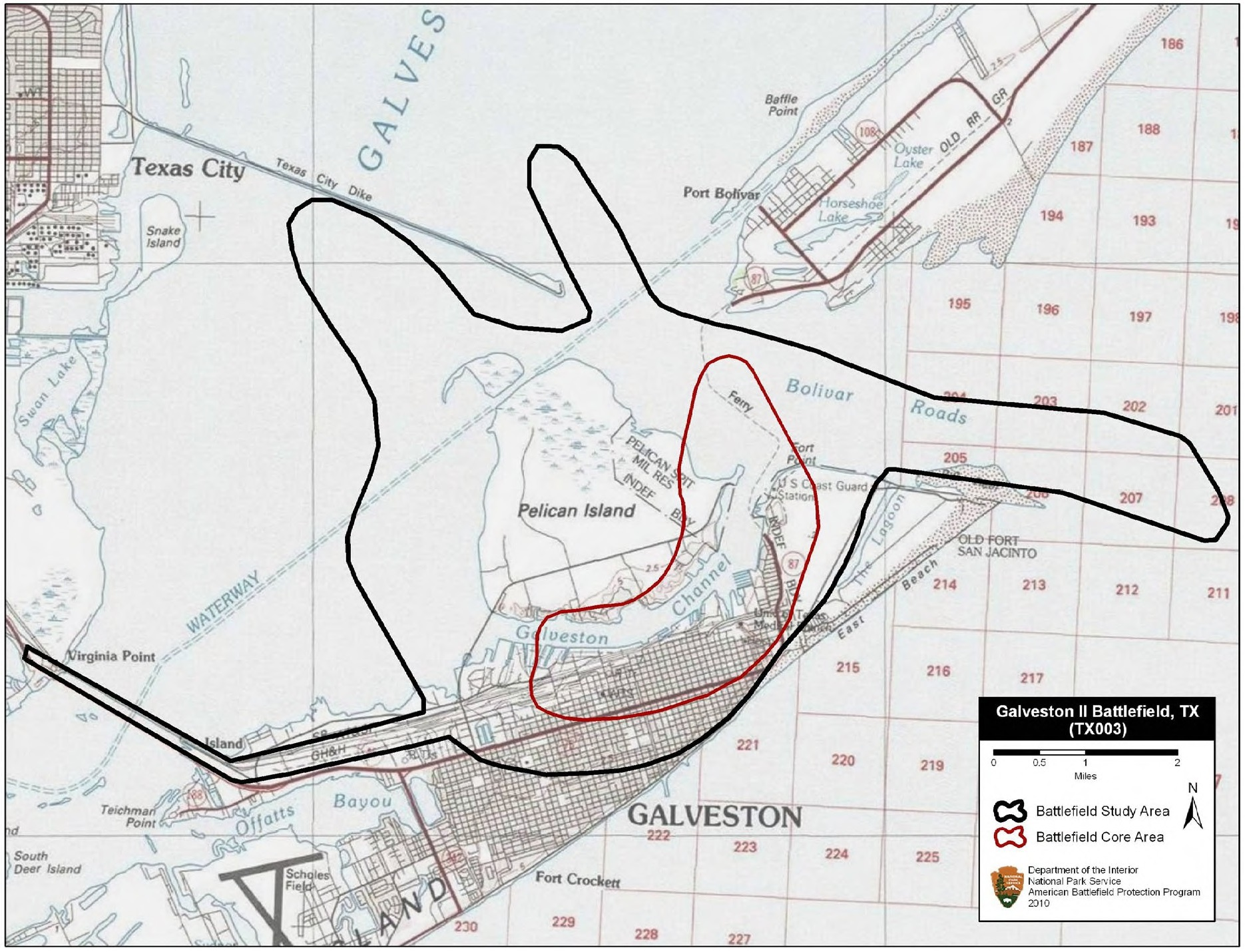
Map of Galveston Battlefield core and study areas by the American Battlefield Protection Program.

The Battle of Galveston was a naval and land battle of the American Civil War, when Confederate forces under Major Gen. John B. Magruder expelled occupying Union troops from the city of Galveston, Texas on January 1, 1863.

After the loss of the cutter Harriet Lane, the Union Fleet Commander William B. Renshaw blew up the stranded vessel USS Westfield to save it from falling into enemy hands. Union troops on shore thought the fleet was surrendering, and laid down their arms. The battle is sometimes called the Second Battle of Galveston, as the Battle of Galveston Harbor in October of 1862 is sometimes called the First Battle of Galveston.

== Battle ==
Two Confederate cottonclads, CS Bayou City and the CS Neptune commanded by Leon Smith, sailed from Houston to Galveston in an effort to engage the Union Fleet in Galveston Harbor, which consisted of USS Clifton, USS Harriet Lane, USS Westfield, USS Owasco, USS Corypheus and USS Sachem. Outnumbered six to two by the Northern ships, Neptune was severely damaged by the Union Fleet and eventually sank. While Neptune was quickly disabled, Bayou City succeeded in capturing USS Harriet Lane.

During this time, USS Westfield was grounded on a sandbar. A temporary truce between the two opposing sides was established, and despite still being outnumbered, the Confederate forces sent over an officer to negotiate terms of surrender of the Union fleet. Their proposal included the surrender of all Union ships present, save one which would be permitted to leave the Harbor with the crew of all other vessels. However, Union Fleet Commander William B. Renshaw rejected the Confederate offer, and attempted to destroy the grounded Westfield with explosives rather than let it fall into enemy hands.

Renshaw and several Union troops were subsequently killed when the explosives were set off too early. Union troops on shore were convinced that their own ships were surrendering and, therefore, laid down their arms. The remaining U.S. ships did not surrender and succeeded in retreating to Union-controlled New Orleans.

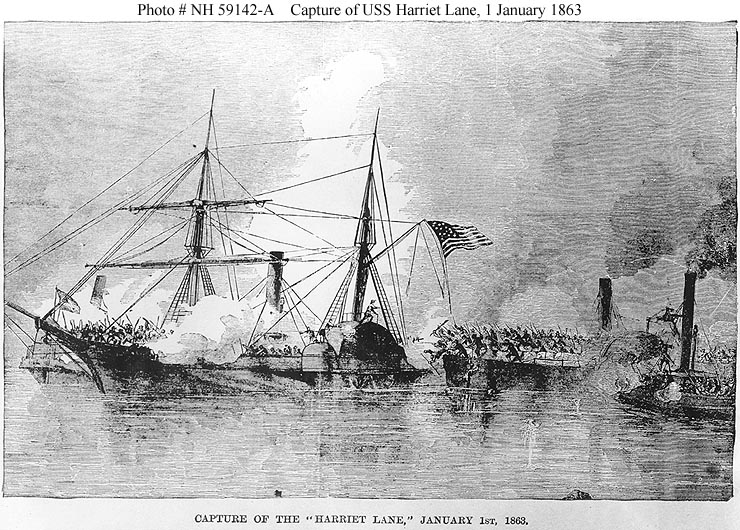
Artist's depiction of the capture of USS Harriet Lane.

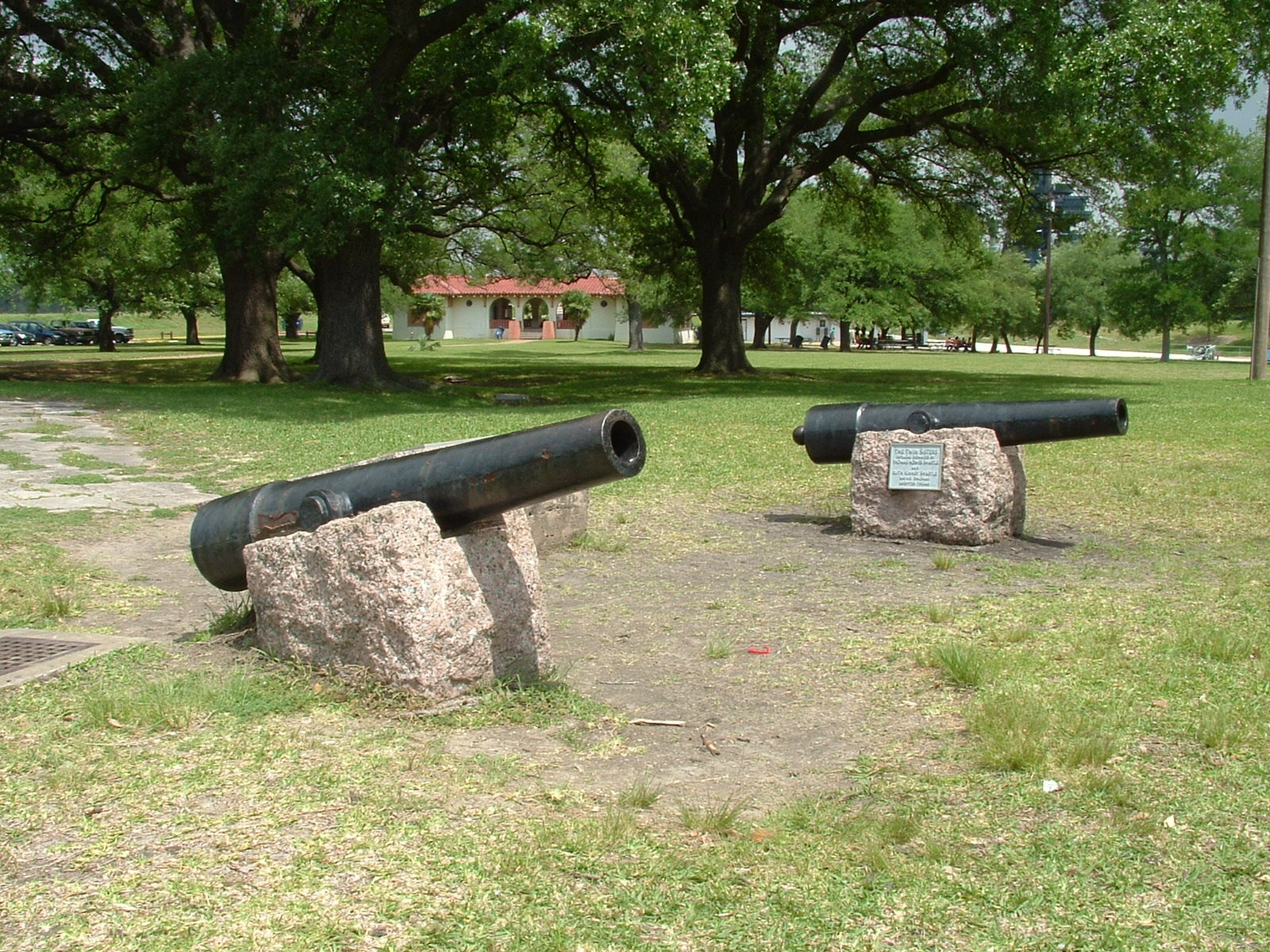
Replicas of the "Twin Sisters", which were used in the 1836 Battle of San Jacinto and the 1863 Battle of Galveston.

== Aftermath ==
The Union blockade around the city of Galveston was lifted temporarily for four days, and Galveston remained the only major port that remained in Confederate hands at the end of the war. The Confederate Congress stated this on the successful recapture of Galveston:

The bold, intrepid, and gallant conduct of Maj. Gen. J. Bankhead Magruder, Col. Thomas Green, Maj. Leon Smith and other officers, and of the Texan Rangers and soldiers engaged in the attack on, and victory achieved over, the land and naval forces of the enemy at Galveston, on January 1, 1863, eminently entitle them to the thanks of Congress and the country... This brilliant achievement, resulting, under the providence of God, in the capture of the war steamer Harriet Lane and the defeat and ignominious flight of the hostile fleet from the harbor, the recapture of the city and the raising of the blockade of the port of Galveston, signally evinces that superior force may be overcome by skillful conception and daring courage.

== See also ==
- Jonathan Mayhew Wainwright II, killed in action during the battle.
