= Joseph Nicolson (antiquarian) =

English antiquarian

Joseph Nicolson (1706 – 1777) was an English antiquarian.

== Life ==
Nicolson was the youngest son of John Nicolson (d. 1727) the diocesan registrar and chapter clerk at Carlisle and a nephew of bishop William Nicolson. His father acquired an estate at Hawksdale in Dalston through his marriage to Mary Miller (d. 1763) with whom he had three daughters and three sons. In 1728 he became proctor to the Consistory Court at Carlisle and in the subsequent year was appointed joint diocesan registrar for life. By 1735 both his elder brothers had died, leaving Joseph to inherit his father's and mother's estates.

Nicolson became a member of an ecclesiastical elite centered on Carlisle and was active in support of the political interests of the Howards of Naworth Castle in the area from the early 1730s. His published correspondence during the period of the Jacobite rising of 1745 shows his active involvement in local politics. By 1768 Nicolson was acting as the agent of William Cavendish-Bentinck, 3rd Duke of Portland in Carlisle.

Nicholson had acquired his uncle's antiquarian collections and these formed the basis of the two volume History and Antiquities of the Counties of Westmorland and Cumberland, which he compiled with Richard Burn. He died shortly before the work was published. He had no children by his wife Elizabeth (d. 1755) and his estate was inherited by his nephew John.
