= CS Bayou City =

American Civil War-era gunboat

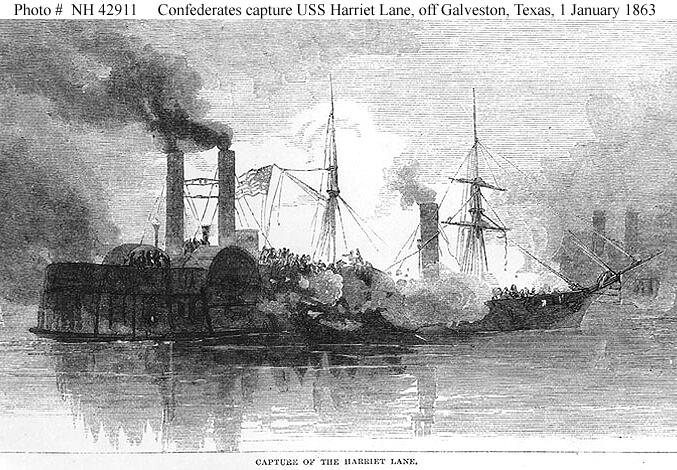
C.S. Bayou City captures the USS Harriet Lane during the Battle of Galveston.

C.S. Army Gunboat Bayou City (1861–1865) was a 165-foot side-wheel steamboat built for commercial use at Jeffersonville, Indiana, in 1859.

Serving as a mail boat between Galveston and Houston, Texas, the ship was chartered on 26 September 1861 by Comdr. W. Hunter, CSN, commanding the Texas Marine Department, from the Houston Navigation Co.

== Military use ==
The Bayou City was clad with pressed cotton for protection, armed with artillery and operated by the State of Texas as a gunboat in the Galveston area. Just over a year after its charter, in October 1862, she was taken over by the Confederate States Army.

== The Battle of Galveston ==
On 1 January 1863, in what would come to be known as the Battle of Galveston, the improvised cotton-clad Bayou City, captained by Henry S. Lubbock the brother of Texas governor Francis Lubbock, served as the flagship of a small fleet under the command of Major Leon Smith which also consisted of the tugboat Neptune and two smaller tenders, who succeeded in an operation to drive superior Union warships out of Galveston Bay.

After a brief contest at sea, the USS Harriet Lane sank the Neptune, and one-half of the two-vessel Confederate fleet was lying on the bottom of the harbor. As the lone surviving Rebel steamer, the Bayou City was outnumbered six-to-one among the armed vessels in the harbor.

However, the Bayou City circled around and made a second run on the USS Harriet Lane. This time, the Confederates hit their target. In short order, the crew of the Bayou City succeeded in storming and overpowering the crew of the Lane. The men from the Bayou City boarded and seized the federal vessel despite the explosion of their own heavy cannon. Ultimately, the attack was a success, with the Harriet Lane captured and another Union vessel, the USS Westfield destroyed.

== Continued service ==
Following the Battle of Galveston, Bayou City served the Confederacy in Texas waters until the conclusion of the American Civil War.

== Fate of the Steamer ==
An advertisement for an Auction Sale in Flake's Daily Galveston Bulletin (Galveston, Galveston Co., TX), Sun., 24 Jun 1866, p. 5, c. 5 - "Sale of Government Property - Will be sold on Tuesday, the 12th July, at 10 o'clock a.m. at the corner of Strand and Tremont streets, in the city of Galveston, the following property: Stm'r Bayou City, near Lagrange, Neches river. The engines, machinery of these boats are said to be good and can be recovered at little cost. Terms, Cash in U.S. Treasury Notes. By order of Geo. W. Dent, Supervising Agent, Treas. Dept., Alex'r N. Shipley, Government Auctioneer."
