= USRC Harriet Lane =

U.S Revenue-Marine cutter

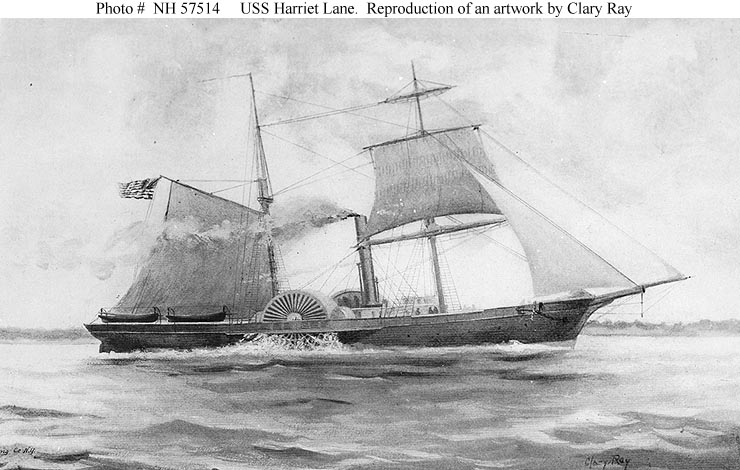
- Artist's rendition of USS Harriet Lane

History

→ United States → Confederate States
- Laid down: 1857
- Launched: 20 November 1857
- Commissioned: U.S. Revenue-Marine, 28 February 1858
- Recommissioned: U.S. Navy, 10 September 1861
- Captured: Confederate States Navy, renamed Lavinia, 1 January 1863
- Fate: Converted to a barque and renamed Elliot Ritchie after the Civil War. Sank off Pernambuco, Brazil in 1884

General characteristics
- Type: Brigantine
- Displacement: 730 tons
- Tons burthen: 639 (bm)
- Length: 180 ft (55 m)
- Beam: 30 ft (9.1 m)
- Draft: 13 ft (4.0 m)
- Propulsion: A double-right-angled marine engine with two side paddles
- Speed: 13 knots (24 km/h; 15 mph)
- Complement: 95 officers and men
- Armament: 1 × 4" gun; 1 × 9" gun; 2 × 8" guns; 2 × 24 lb brass howitzers (1862)

Harriet Lane was a revenue cutter of the United States Revenue Cutter Service and, on the outbreak of the American Civil War, a ship of the United States Navy and later Confederate States Navy. The craft was named after the niece of senator and later United States President, James Buchanan; during his presidency, she acted as First Lady. The cutter was christened and entered the water for the Revenue Service in 1859 out of New York City, and saw action during the Civil War at Fort Sumter, New Orleans, Galveston, Texas, and Virginia Point. The Confederates captured her in 1863, whereupon she was converted to mercantile service. Union forces recaptured her at the end of war. The U.S. Navy declared her unfit for service and sold her. New owners out of Philadelphia renamed her Elliot Ritchie. Her crew abandoned her at sea in 1881.

== Layout of the ship ==
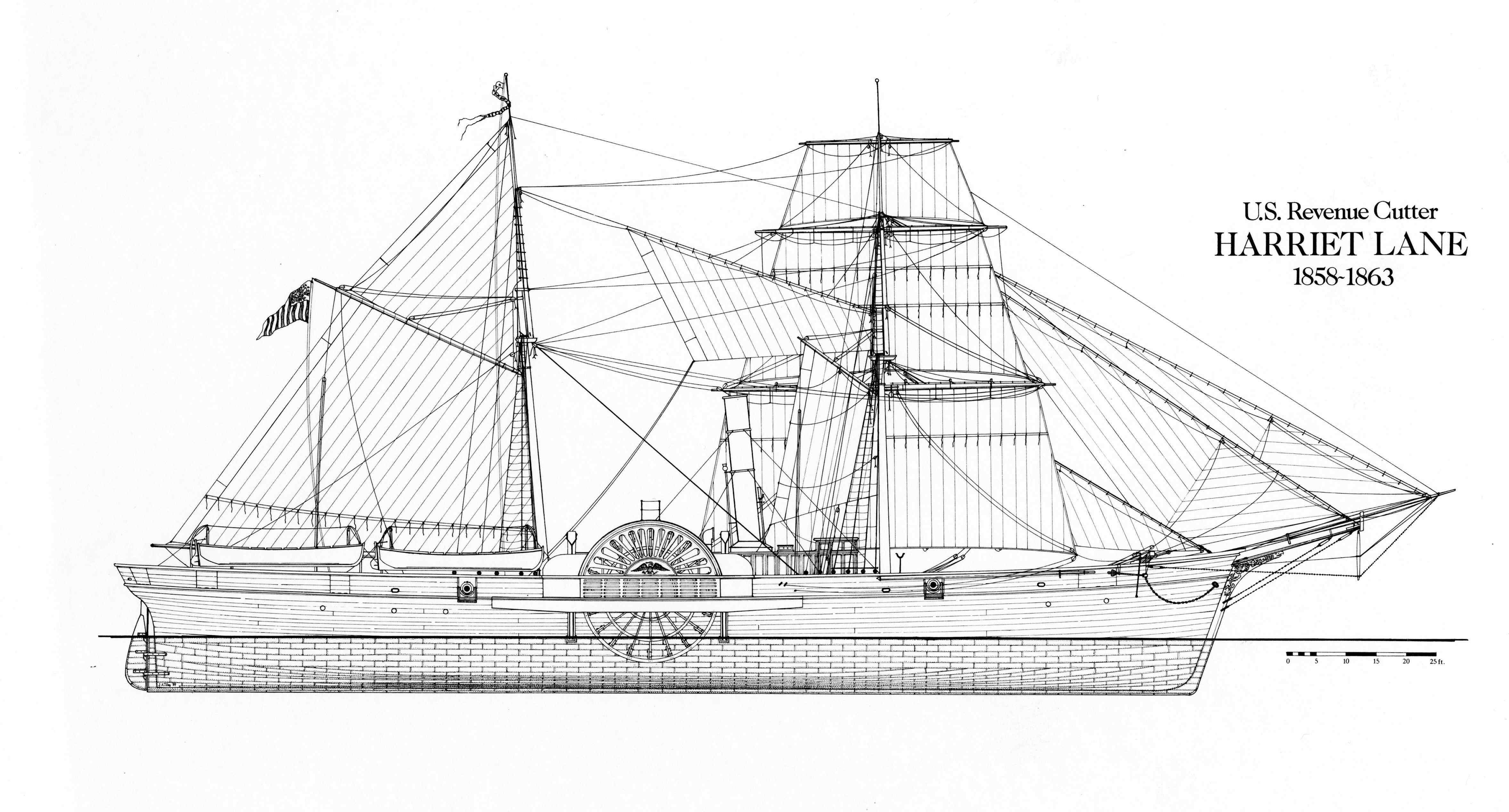
Plans of Harriet Lane

Harriet Lane measured 180 feet long, 30 feet wide and 12 feet from the bottom of the hull to the main deck. Her propulsion was a double-right-angled marine engine with two side paddles, supported by two masts; the entire ship was sheathed and fastened with copper. From stern to bow, the captain's cabin and stateroom sat above an aft magazine, forward of which was a second magazine with the officer quarters above. Forward of this, in the midships was the engine machinery and coal supply, and beyond this the quarters and galley for the non-commissioned ranks which sat above a third magazine. Her initial armaments were described as "light guns", however after joining the West Gulf Squadron her firepower was upgraded somewhat: one four-inch rifled Parrott gun to the forecastle, one nine-inch Dahlgren gun before the first mast, two eight-inch Dahlgren Columbiads and two twenty-four-pound brass howitzers. Her crew of 95 were also issued small arms.

== Career ==
=== With the Union ===
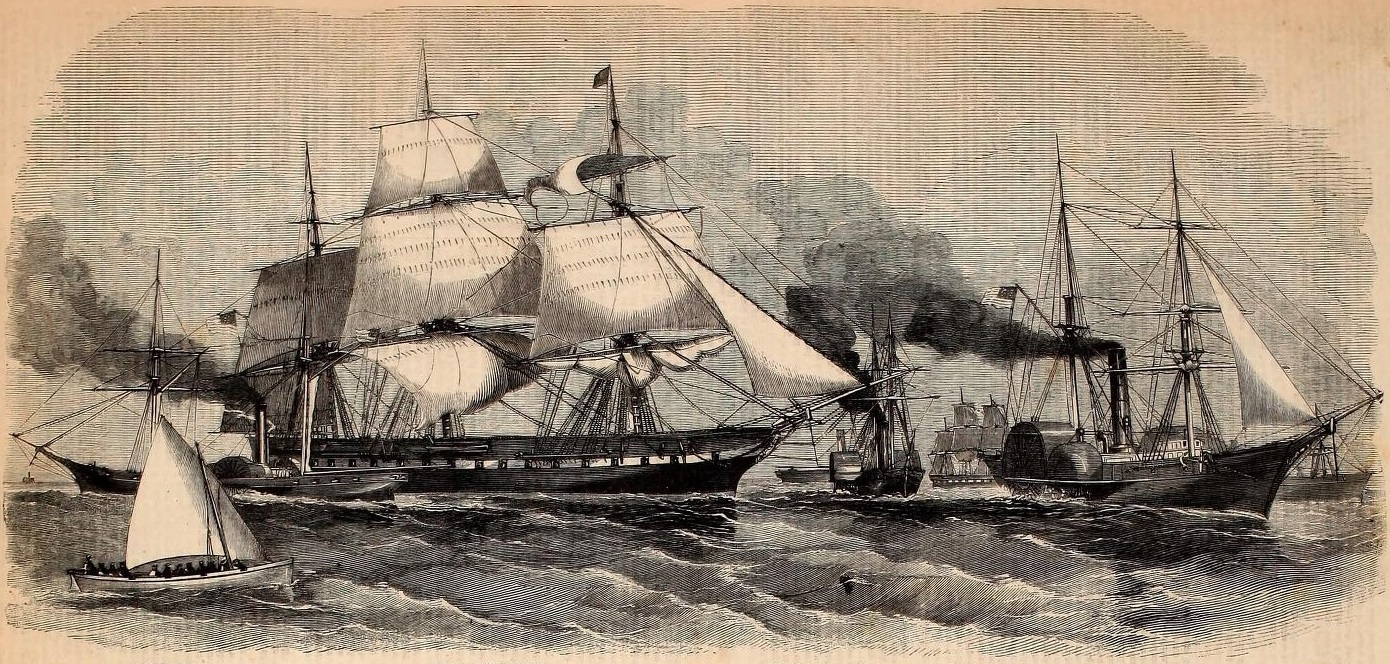
The Paraguay Squadron (Harper's Weekly, New York, October 16, 1858).

Harriet Lane, built for the Treasury Department by William H. Webb, was launched in New York City, in November 1857. She was a copper-plated steamer that could make speeds of up to eleven knots. Her battery consisted of three thirty-two-pounders and four twenty-four-pound howitzers. She served as a revenue cutter until temporarily transferred to the Navy late in 1858. Her new assignment took her to Paraguay with a squadron ordered to support the discussions of U.S. Special Commissioner James B. Bowlin with Dictator Carlos Antonio López concerning reparations for damages incurred during an attack on Water Witch by a Paraguayan fort, February 1, 1855. This display of sea power quickly won the United States a prompt and respectful hearing which four years of diplomacy had failed to obtain. Paraguay paid a modest indemnity to compensate the family of an American seaman killed during the fight. In his report, Flag Officer William B. Shubrick singled out Harriet Lane for special commendation on the invaluable service she rendered in extricating his other ships that repeatedly ran aground in the treacherous waters of the Paraná River.

Returning to the United States, Harriet Lane resumed her former duties as a revenue cutter. Captain John A. Faunce, USRCS was commanding officer. In September 1860 she embarked Edward Albert, Prince of Wales, the first member of the British Royal Family to visit the United States, for passage to Mount Vernon, where he planted a tree and placed a wreath on the tomb of George Washington.

USRC Harriet Lane again transferred to the Navy on March 30, 1861, for service in the expedition sent to Charleston, South Carolina, to supply the Fort Sumter garrison after the outbreak of the American Civil War. She departed New York April 8 and arrived off Charleston April 11. On the evening of the 11th, Harriet Lane fired on the civilian steamship Nashville when that merchantman appeared with no colors flying. Nashville avoided further attack by promptly hoisting the United States ensign. When Major Robert Anderson surrendered Fort Sumter 13 April, Harriet Lane withdrew with the other Union ships. According to Coast Guard historian Captain Commandant Horatio Davis Smith, USRCS, Ret; Second Lieutenant Daniel Thompkins fired the first naval shot of the Civil War with the thirty-two pounder he commanded on the deck of the Harriet Lane at the mail steamer Nashville when she failed to show her colors.

On 5 June 1861 Harriet Lane, commanded by Captain John Faunce, USRCS; engaged Confederate forces in the Battle of Pig Point Virginia.

Her next important service came the following summer when a task force was sent against Fort Clark and Fort Hatteras on the outer banks of North Carolina to check blockade running in the area. The ships sailed from Hampton Roads on August 26, 1861, for the Battle of Hatteras Inlet Batteries, the war's first important combined amphibious operation. The next morning, Harriet Lane, Monticello, and Pawnee slipped close inshore to directly support the landings, while heavier ships pounded the forts from deeper water. The last resistance was snuffed out the following afternoon, giving a badly needed boost to morale in the North, which had been disheartened a month before by defeat in the First Battle of Bull Run. Of greater importance was that this combined operation opened the inland waterways to Union ships and gave the North Atlantic Blockading Squadron a base deep in Southern waters.

Harriet Lane ran aground while attempting to enter Pamlico Sound through Hatteras Inlet on August 29 and suffered severe damage while fast on the shoal. She was refloated at the cost of her armament, rigging, stores, provisions, and everything else on board that could be heaved over the side to lighten ship. Temporary repairs completed on September 3, she proceeded to Hampton Roads, arriving September 8, 1861.

Harriet Lane sailed February 10, 1862, to join Commander David Dixon Porter's Mortar Flotilla at Key West, where units were assembling for an attack on Confederate forts in the Mississippi River Delta below New Orleans. Comdr. Porter embarked at Washington. During her passage to Hampton Roads, Harriet Lane was taken under fire by the Confederate battery at Shipping Point, Virginia, which inflicted such damage to her port wheel that her departure for Key West was delayed another two days. On February 24 she captured the Confederate schooner Joanna Ward off Florida.

Harriet Lane then targeted the Confederate fleets in Louisiana and Texas as part of the West Gulf Squadron under the command of Commodore Farragut, a duty for which her firepower was upgraded as mentioned above. Commanded by Commander Jonathan M. Wainwright and Lieutenant Commander Edward Lea at this point, she was used as Farragut's flagship until he transferred to the Hartford on January 20. She was then ordered to join a fleet under the command of Captain David D. Porter at the mouth of the Mississippi River. On March 4, 1862, this fleet moved to attack Confederate forts south of New Orleans in the Battle of Forts Jackson and St. Philip, advancing up the river and engaging Fort Jackson on April 18 and passing it on April 24, with New Orleans falling the next day. Harriet Lane was sent on June 29, 1862, to attack the Vicksburg batteries.

Farragut ordered the Mortar Flotilla to Ship Island May 1, and Harriet Lane continued to Pensacola, Florida, where she transported Brigadier General Lewis G. Arnold's troops from Fort Pickens to the other side of the bay, where they occupied Forts Barrancas and McRee, Barancas Barracks, and the Navy Yard which had been abandoned by the Confederates. Back at Ship Island for repairs May 30, Harriet Lane prepared to ascend the Mississippi with Porter's mortar boats to engage enemy batteries on the cliffs of Vicksburg, Mississippi, while Farragut ran past this river stronghold to join Flag Officer Charles Henry Davis in an effort to clear the entire Mississippi Valley of obstructions to Union shipping. However, sufficient ground forces to take Vicksburg were not made available, nullifying the value of his operation, and after a frustrating encounter with the new Confederate ironclad ram Arkansas, Farragut ran back down past Vicksburg while Harriet Lane and her fellow Union vessels in the Mortar Flotilla again covered the dash by bombarding the Confederate batteries 15 July.

In September, she was sent to Galveston, Texas as part of a blockade fleet under the command of Commodore Eagle, whose flagship was too large to enter the river and was subsequently relieved of command on October 1. On October 4, Harriet Lane advanced into Galveston Harbor and participated in a small exchange with the rebel Fort Point and shore batteries, known as the First Battle of Galveston Harbor. On October 9 Union marines landed to raise the United States flag, and the key to the city was given to the captain of Harriet Lane, Captain Wainright. Union forces from the ships occupied the town, but fell back to the docks every night as Confederate cavalry entered the town every evening. The ships bombarded the town at regular intervals.

In the early morning of January 1, 1863, with almost all ships, including Harriet Lane, anchored in the channel, an alarm was raised reporting Confederate forces approaching. With only the Westfield ready to maneuver, she sailed upriver in an attempt to engage the approaching Confederate vessels. The Westfield grounded, but the attack was reckoned to be merely a retreat by Confederate ships, and the alarm was cancelled. There was, however, a Confederate land force under the command of General John B. Magruder that was approaching Galveston. At four o'clock that morning, in what would come to be known as the Battle of Galveston, the reoccupied Confederate forts opened fire on the Union fleet while ground troops attempted to board the anchored ships. The late arrival of a Confederate fleet enabled the troops to board the Harriet Lane, which was raked by gunfire and rammed, leaving Wainright dead and Lea mortally wounded. In one of the war's most poignant incidents, when Lea was mortally wounded, his father, Confederate Major Albert M. Lea was serving ashore in Galveston. He came aboard the Harriet Lane only to realize his son was near death.

=== With the Confederacy ===
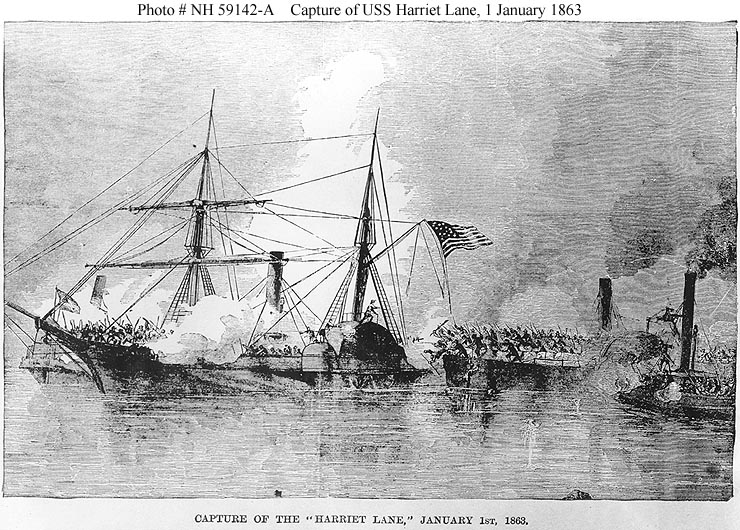
Artist's rendering of the capture of Harriet Lane by CS Bayou City, January 1, 1863

During the Battle of Galveston, Harriet Lane sank the Rebel tugboat Neptune, leaving one-half of the two-vessel Confederate fleet lying on the bottom of the harbor. However, the Confederate gunboat CS Bayou City circled and made a second run on Harriet Lane. At daybreak, Harriet Lane was listing steeply, and a boat was dispatched from her side to the remaining Union ships to negotiate a surrender. During the negotiations, Harriet Lane was further damaged by fire from the Union Owasco under a flag of truce in an attempt to explode her magazine. The flagship Westfield was later exploded, and the remaining Union ships fled to New Orleans, leaving Harriet Lane, along with a copy of the United States signal service code book in her cabin, in Confederate hands.

The capture of Harriet Lane was an interesting episode of the Civil War, as it possibly involved the youngest combatant of the American Civil War. According to an account by a captured member of the Confederate boarding party:

Amongst the first men struck down were the gallant Captain Wainwright and Lieutenant Lee, who both fought with desperation and valor.

One young son of Captain Wainwright, just ten years old, stood at the cabin door with a revolver in each hand and never ceased firing until he had expended every shot.

The capture of the Harriet Lane involved also possibly the oldest active combatant of the Civil War. Captain Levi C. Harby of the Texas Maritime Service, 69 years old, was in command of the Neptune, and was the last to leave that vessel after ramming the Harriet Lane portside. The Neptune was hit by Federal gunners and sank, but the water was shallow enough that Harby and his men could continue firing their guns from her deck. This distraction enabled the Bayou City to carry out the successful starboard attack that captured the Harriet Lane.

After a week of repairs, Harriet Lane was placed under the command of Captain Thomas C. Saunders and dispatched to fight the Union vessels at sea, despite lengthy legal discussions regarding the capture of the prize which had not yet drawn to a close. As a result, the ship was taken farther upriver and stripped of weapons to lighten her load. Lieutenant Joseph Nicholson Barney of the Confederate States Navy was dispatched to command her and additional vessels in Galveston, however the ship was already under command of Leon Smith, (Note: Leon Smith is variously referred to as lieutenant, captain, major, colonel, and commodore by different sources. While referred to by Magruder as a commissioned officer and recommended for formal commission Smith never actually entered navy or army service. De facto, as "Commander, Marine Department of Texas", he was in charge of all or most marine operations in the area of Texas under general Magruder's control, commanding several vessels.) an army volunteer and steamboat captain, who had played a role in capturing the ship, having been placed in command of the ship by Major General John B. Magruder and in control of additional ships improvised as a "cottonclad fleet". The ship was also considered by the navy to be too slow and inefficient to become a blockade runner. Barney conceded the appointment, and in a letter to Confederate naval secretary Stephen Mallory recommended that the navy relinquish control. Barney later explained that he made his recommendation since he considered that the presence of two separate marine forces with independent commanders would lead to discord and confusion.

In the 30th of April 1864 She was dispatched past the Union blockade to Cuba, loaded with a cargo of cotton. At Havana she was entered into the British naval registry and named Lavinia. At the end of the war she was interned at Havana and was recovered by the U.S. government.

== Recapture and sale ==
Harriet Lane was declared unfit for naval service. She was refitted to an unarmed sailing bark and renamed Elliot Ritchie, and operated out of Philadelphia, transporting coal and merchandise. In 1884 a fire broke out in her cargo hold and she was abandoned at sea.

== See also ==
- Battle of Galveston
- CS Bayou City
- CS Neptune
- USCGC Harriet Lane, a modern cutter named for Harriet Lane
