= USS Clifton (1861) =

Gunboat of the United States Navy

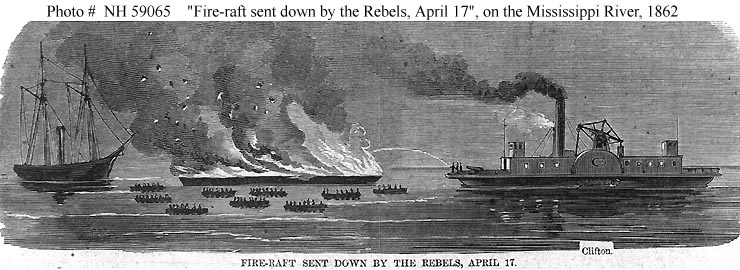
- USS Clifton playing a fire hose on a Confederate fire raft on the lower Mississippi River, 17 April 1862

History
- Operator: Union Navy; Texas Marine Department (1863)
- Launched: 1861
- Acquired: 1861
- Commissioned: 1862
- Fate: Burned to prevent capture, 1864

General characteristics
- Displacement: 892 tons
- Propulsion: Walking beam steam engine; side paddle wheels

USS Clifton was a shallow-draft side-wheel paddle steamer, built in 1861 at Brooklyn, as a civilian ferry. The Union Navy bought her early that December, and commissioned her after having her converted into a gunboat. In 1863 she ran aground, was captured and commissioned into the Texas Marine Department. Her career ended in 1864 when she ran aground and her Confederate crew burned her to prevent her recapture.

== US Navy service ==
Clifton steamed from New York to the Gulf of Mexico in February–March 1862. In April she towed mortar schooners into the Mississippi River and supported them as they bombarded the Confederate fortifications below New Orleans. Following the fall of the forts and city later in the month, she operated with Rear Admiral David Farragut's squadron during its drive up the river to Vicksburg, Mississippi. There, on 28 June 1862 Clifton was damaged by enemy gunfire.

Clifton participated in the Battle of Baton Rouge on 5 August 1862.

In October 1862, Clifton took part in the capture of Galveston, Texas. She helped seize Fort Burton, at Butte La Rose, Louisiana, in April 1863. In mid-July, her crew assisted in capturing the sailing bark H. McGuin. Later in the month she fired on Confederate batteries on the Atchafalaya River, Louisiana.

== Capture and Confederate service ==
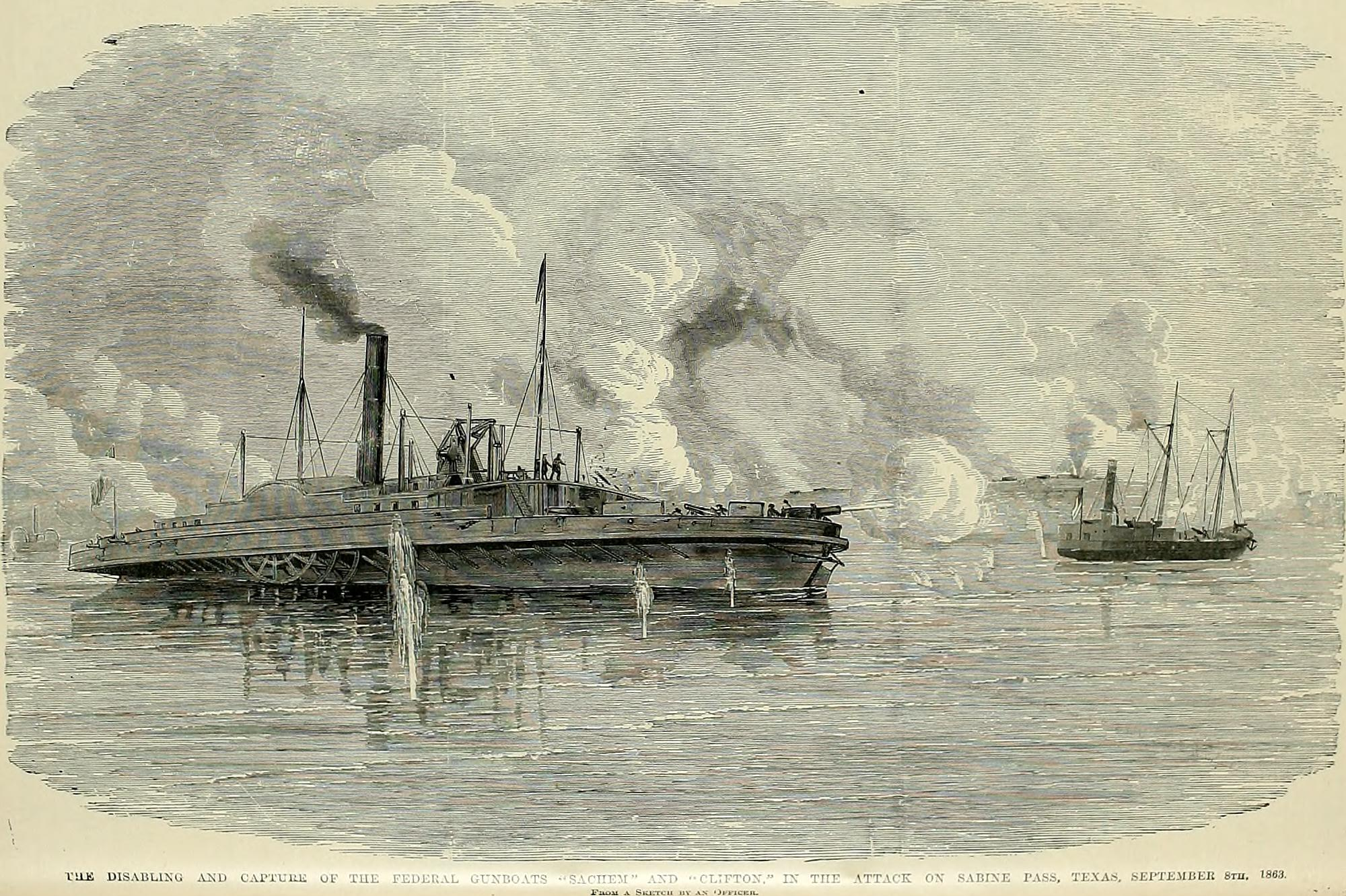
Clifton (left) is captured at Sabine Pass along with USS Sachem

On 8 September 1863, during a Union attack on Sabine Pass, Texas, Clifton grounded while under intense cannon fire and was captured.

Entering Confederate service with the Texas Marine Department, Clifton was employed as a gunboat. According to a report made by Colonel S.P. Bankhead, Chief of Artillery for the Department of Texas in mid-December 1863, she was armed with 3 – 9-inch Dahlgren Cannon, 1- 30 pdr Rifle, and 3 – 32 pdr Guns. On 21 March 1864 she ran aground off Sabine Pass while attempting to run the blockade. After attempts to refloat the ship failed, Clifton was burned by her crew to prevent capture by Union warships.
