= CS Neptune =

American Civil War-era vessel

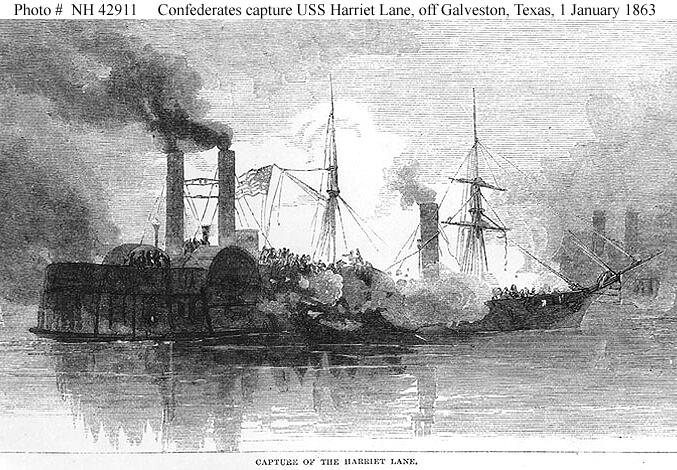
The CS Bayou City captures USS Harriet Lane, CS Neptune is visible on the right.

C.S. Army Tug Neptune (c. 1862–1863) was a wooden tugboat taken over by the Confederate States Army in about 1862 for the Texas Marine Department. She was employed as a tug, transport, and lookout vessel in the vicinity of Galveston, Texas.

On 1 January 1863, during the Battle of Galveston, Confederate troops used her and the gunboat CS Bayou City in an effort to board and capture the United States Revenue Cutter Service revenue cutter USRC Harriet Lane. Though the enterprise was a success, Neptune was badly damaged and sank shortly afterwards.
