= Granite (disambiguation) =

Granite is a type of rock.

Granite may also refer to:

== Places ==
- Granite City (disambiguation)
- Granite Falls (disambiguation)
- Granite Island (disambiguation)
- Granite Lake (disambiguation)
- Granite Peak, list of mountains with the same name

=== United States ===
- Granite, Colorado
- Granite, Iowa
- Granite, Maryland
- Granite, Oklahoma
- Granite, Utah
- Granite, Wyoming
- Granite State, the official nickname of New Hampshire
- Granite Bay, California

== Music ==
- Granite (song), a 2007 song by Pendulum from In Silico
- Granite, a 2023 song by Sleep Token from Take Me Back to Eden

== Other uses ==
- 2ES10, a Russian electric locomotive, also known as the "Granite".
- Zack Granite, a professional baseball player

== See also ==
- Granit (disambiguation)
- The Granites (disambiguation)
