= Battle of Sabine Pass =

Two Battles of Sabine Pass were fought during the American Civil War:

- First Battle of Sabine Pass, September 25, 1862
- Second Battle of Sabine Pass, September 8, 1863
