= Granite City =

Granite City may refer to:

- Granite City Township, Madison County, Illinois
  - Granite City, Illinois, U.S.
- Granite City, Wisconsin, U.S.
- USS Granite City (1863), a Confederate steamer
- Aberdeen, Scotland
- Aughrim, County Wicklow, Ireland
- Jalore, Rajasthan, India, known as the Granite City of India
- Mount Airy, North Carolina, U.S.
- Quincy, Massachusetts, U.S.
- St. Cloud, Minnesota, U.S.
- Wausau, Wisconsin, U.S.

== See also ==
- Granite (disambiguation)
