= Sabine Pass Battleground State Historic Site =

Sabine Pass Battleground State Historic Site Texas State Historic Site
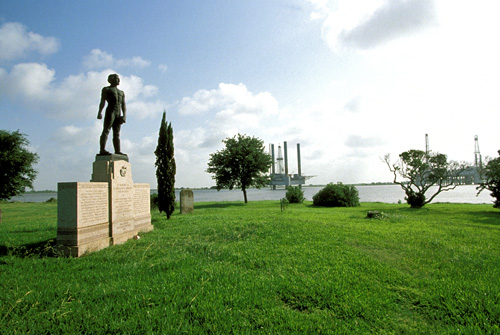
- Sabine Pass Battleground State Historic Site

- Sabine Pass Battleground State Historic Site (the United States)
- 29°43′43″N 93°52′30″W
- Location: 6100 Dowling Rd., Port Arthur, Texas

Site notes
- Governing body: Texas Historical Commission
- Website: Sabine Pass Battleground State Historic Site

Sabine Pass Battleground State Historic Site is located in Jefferson County, Texas, where the Sabine River enters the Gulf of Mexico. The site is the location of a significant Civil War battle.

In September 1863, members of the Davis Guard—led by Confederate Lt. Richard "Dick" Dowling—held off a Union attack at Sabine Pass, a key port for Confederate shipments of supplies. In a battle lasting less than an hour, Dowling and his men destroyed two gunboats, captured nearly 350 prisoners, and prevented Union forces from penetrating the Texas interior.

Today, the site is operated as a historic site by the Texas Historical Commission. Features include the 1936 statue honoring Dowling's feats, a monument dedicated to the Union casualties, outdoor educational exhibits, and a scale model of the Civil War-era fort and battle.

== See also ==
- List of Texas state historic sites
- Fort Manhassett
- Leon Smith (naval commander)
- Anaconda Plan
