= Granite Lake =

Granite Lake may refer to:

- Granite Lake (Kawdy Plateau), a lake in British Columbia, Canada
- Granite Lake (New Hampshire), a lake in Cheshire County
- Granite Lake (Wisconsin), a lake in Barron County
- Granite Lake (Minnesota/Ontario), an international lake
- Granite Lake (Powell River), a lake in British Columbia, Canada
- Granite Lake (Saskatchewan), a lake in Saskatchewan, Canada

== See also ==
- Granite Basin Lake
