= Davis Guards Medal =

Confederate States campaign medal

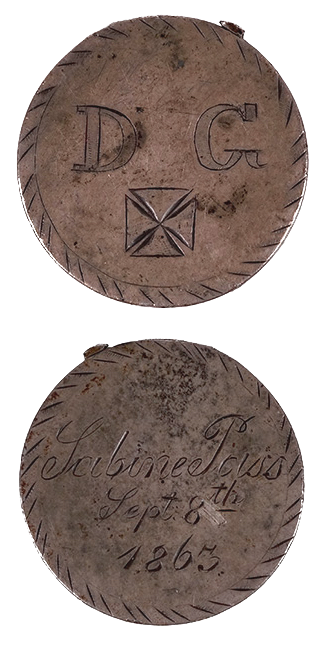
- Obverse and reverse of the medal
- Type: Campaign medal
- Awarded for: The defense of Sabine Pass, Texas
- Country: Confederate States
- Presented by: the citizens of Houston
- Eligibility: Members of Company F (Davis Guards), 1st (Cook's) Texas Heavy Artillery Regiment; Second Lieutenant N. W. Smith, Engineer Corps; and Assistant Surgeon George H. Bailey
- Campaigns: Joint Federal Expedition to Sabine Pass, Texas (September 7–8, 1863)
- Established: 1863; 162 years ago

The Davis Guards Medal was a military award presented by the citizens of Houston to each of the participants a few weeks after the battle of Sabine Pass (September 8, 1863). Father Quesart, in charge of the Catholic Church in Houston during the American Civil War, started the project by popular subscription. These hand-engraved medals are the only medals known to be presented to Confederate soldiers during the Civil War.

== History ==
The Davis Guards Medal was presented by the citizens of Houston a few weeks after the battle of Sabine Pass (September 8, 1863) to the members of Company F (Davis Guards), 1st (Cook's) Texas Heavy Artillery Regiment; Second Lieutenant N. W. Smith, Engineer Corps; and Assistant Surgeon George H. Bailey. Some time later, President Jefferson Davis also visited that locality, and the Davis Guards had another medal made and presented it to him.

== Appearance ==
The obverse of the Davis Guards Medal consisted of a Mexican silver dollar, each side smoothed off and engraved like a love token with the letters " D G ", below which is a rude cross of the form known as cross pattée. The reverse of the medal bore the inscription in three lines " Sabine Pass " / " Sept. 8th " / " 1863 " in cursive script. Border, on each side, a line, about one-eighth of an inch from the edge, from which groups of oblique lines extend to the edge. Loop for suspension.

== Museum exhibitions and displays ==
Four of the medals are known to exist. These are on display at the American Civil War Museum, Bullock Museum, and Texas Military Forces Museum, and The Bryan Museum.

== Recipients ==
Below is a list of recipients of the Davis Guards Medal. On February 8, 1864, all members of the artillery company also received the "thanks of Congress."

- Patrick Abbott
- George H. Bailey
- Michael Carr (Note: Buried at Texas State Cemetery.)
- Abner R. Carter
- Patrick Clair
- James Corcoran
- Hugh Deagan
- Michael Delaney
- Thomas Daughtery
- Jefferson Davis (Honorary)
- John A. Drummond
- Daniel Donovan
- Richard W. Dowling
- Michael Eagan
- David Fitzgerald
- Patrick Fitzgerald
- James Fleming
- John Flood (Note: Buried at Texas State Cemetery.)
- William Gleason
- John Hassott
- James Higgins
- Timothy Hurley
- John Hennessey
- Thomas Hagerty
- Timothy Huggins
- William Hardin (Note: Buried at Texas State Cemetery.)
- W. L. Jett
- Patrick Malone
- Thomas McKernon
- John McKeever
- Alexander McCabe
- Timothy McDonough
- Patrick McDonnell
- John McGrath
- John McNealis
- Daniel McMurray
- Michael Monoghan
- Richard O'Hara
- Laurence Plunkett
- Edward Pritchard
- Maurice Powers
- Charles Rheins
- N. W. Smith
- Thomas Sullivan (Note: Buried at Texas State Cemetery.)
- Michael Sullivan
- Patrick Sullivan
- Matthew Walsh
- Jack W. White
- John Wesley
- Joseph Wilson

== See also ==
- List of military decorations
