= Richard W. Dowling =

Confederate States Army officer

Richard William Dowling
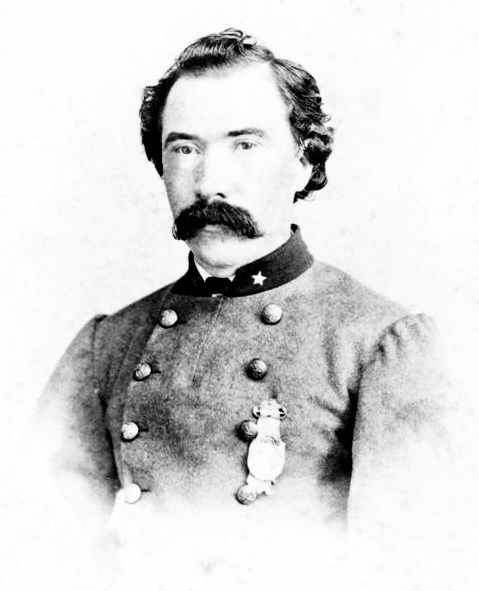
- Dowling in uniform, ca. 1865
- Born: January 1837; Milltown, Ireland, U.K.
- Died: 23 September 1867 (aged 30); Houston, Fifth Military District, U.S.
- Burial place: St. Vincent's Cemetery; Houston, Texas, U.S.
- Military career
- Allegiance: Confederate States
- Branch: Confederate States Army
- Service years: 1861–1865
- Rank: Major
- Nickname: "Dick"
- Commands: Company F (Davis Guards), 1st (Cook's) Texas Heavy Artillery Regiment
- Conflicts: American Civil War: Texas Border Outpost Raids; Battle of Galveston; 1863 Naval Battle; Battle of Sabine Pass (1863)
- Awards: Thanks of Congress; Davis Guards Medal; Southern Cross of Honor; Confederate Medal of Honor

Richard William Dowling (baptized 14 January 1837 – 23 September 1867) was an Irish-born artillery officer of the Confederate States Army who achieved distinction as commander at the battle of Sabine Pass (1863), the most one-sided Confederate victory during the American Civil War. It is considered the "Thermopylae of the Confederacy" and prevented Texas from being liberated by the Union. For his actions, Dowling received the "thanks of Congress" (of the Confederate States), Davis Guards Medal, Southern Cross of Honor, and Confederate Medal of Honor. Over a dozen other memorials have also been dedicated in his honor.

== Biography ==
Dowling was born in the townland of Knockballyvishteal, Milltown, County Galway, Ireland in January 1837, the second of eight children, born to tenant farmer Patrick and Bridget Dowling (née Qualter). Following eviction of his family from their home in 1845, the first year of the Great Famine, nine-year-old Dowling left Ireland with his older sister Honora, bound for New Orleans in the United States in 1846. As a teenager, young Dick Dowling displayed his entrepreneurial skills by successfully running the Continental Coffeehouse, a saloon in the fashionable French Quarter. His parents and siblings followed from Ireland in 1851, but the joy of reunion was short-lived. In 1853, a yellow fever outbreak in New Orleans took the lives of his parents and one of his younger brothers. With rising anti-Irish feeling growing in New Orleans, following local elections which saw a landslide victory for the 'Know Nothing' party, Dowling moved to Houston in 1857, where he leased the first of a number of saloons, a two-story building centrally located on the corner of Main and Prairie Streets. He named it the Shades, from the sycamore and cottonwood trees which lined the two streets and shaded the building. Advertised as 'inferior to none in the state' he opened a billiards saloon on the first floor. Dowling was described as a likable red-headed Irishman and wore a large moustache, possibly to make him appear older than he looked, as he was called 'The Kid' by family and friends alike at this time. In 1857 he married Elizabeth Ann Odlum, daughter of Benjamin Digby Odlum, a Kildare-born Irishman, who had fought in the Texas War of Independence, being captured at the Battle of Refugio in 1836. Following Texas Independence, he was elected subsequently to the fledgling Third Congress of the Republic of Texas.

== Business and civic interests ==
By 1860, Dowling owned a number of saloons. His most successful was named the Bank of Bacchus, located on Courthouse Square in downtown Houston. "The Bank" as it was known locally became Houston's most popular social gathering place in the 1860s and was renowned for its hospitality. Dowling's previous experience as a barkeeper in New Orleans stood him in good stead. Quickly establishing himself, Dowling courted publicity from local newspapers and also made a number of property investments. He was also involved in setting up Houston's first gaslight company, and was first to have it installed in his home and "The Bank". Dowling was a founding member of Houston's Hook and Ladder Company Number One fire department and was also involved in running the city's first streetcar company

== American Civil War ==
=== Background ===
Prior to the outbreak of the Civil War, Dowling had made a name for himself as an able and successful entrepreneur. Among other things, he had been involved with a predominantly Irish militia company which served a more social than military role in Houston society. On Secession, this militia company was mustered straight into the Confederate Army, with Dowling himself being elected first lieutenant. Composed primarily of Houston Irish, many of them clients from his saloons, this unit named themselves the "Davis Guards" in honor of Confederate President Jefferson Davis, who had been in Texas as a young officer in the pre-war United States Army and was remembered for his prowess and leadership skills. The Davis Guards were initially part of a Texas State Troops/Confederate expedition sent to take over Union Army forts and arsenals along the border with Mexico; the expedition was successfully completed without a shot being fired. They participated in the Battle of Galveston on New Year's Day 1863, following which they were assigned to a newly constructed artillery post near the mouth of Sabine River called "Fort Sabine" (later named "Fort Griffin", not the same as the later Fort Griffin established west of Fort Worth).

=== Prelude ===
Sabine Pass was important as a point of arrival and departure for blockade runners. With the fall of Vicksburg in July 1863, followed by the Battle of Gettysburg, it was obvious that the Civil War was now not going well for the Confederacy, an invasion of Texas appeared to be imminent. It was suspected that the Union Army would attempt an invasion of Texas via Sabine Pass, because of its value as a harbor for blockade runners and because about 18 miles northwest was Beaumont, on the railroad between Houston and the eastern part of the Confederacy.

To negotiate Sabine Pass all vessels except small boats took one of the two river channels, both of about 5 feet (1.5 meters) depth and one on each side of the Pass. These channels were separated by naturally formed "oyster-banks" known to be barely two feet (0.61 meters) under the surface. No seagoing ship could traverse the Pass without great risk of going aground, if it did not follow one of the channels. The inevitable course of any steam-powered warship—including shallow-draft gunboats then common to the U.S. Navy—would necessarily use one of the channels, both of which were within fair range of the fort's six smoothbores.

Dowling spent the summer of 1863 at the earthen fort instructing his men in gunnery. To mark the optimum distance and elevation for each of the guns, he implemented the technique of setting long slender poles (painted white, in this instance) in both channels at several places. This was an old method for guiding boats and, especially since the advent of firearms, to mark an aiming points for guns.

=== Defense of Sabine Pass, Texas ===
On 8 September 1863 a Union Navy flotilla of some 22 gunboats and transports with 5,000 men accompanied by cavalry and artillery arrived off the mouth of Sabine Pass. The plan of invasion was sound, but monumentally mismanaged. Four of the flanking gunboats were to steam up the pass at speed and draw the fire of the fort, two in each channel, a tactic which had been used successfully in subduing the defensive fortifications of Mobile and New Orleans prior to this, when gunboats disabled the forts at close range with their own guns. This time, though, Dowling's artillery drills paid off as the Confederates poured a rapid and withering fire onto the incoming gunboats, scoring several direct hits, disabling and capturing two, while the others retreated in disarray. The rest of the flotilla retreated from the mouth of the pass and returned ignominiously to New Orleans, leaving the disabled ships with no option but to surrender to Dowling. With a command of just 47 men, Lieut. Dowling had thwarted an attempted invasion of Texas, in the process capturing two gunboats, some 350 prisoners and a large quantity of supplies and munitions.

=== Davis Guards Medal ===
The Confederate States Congress offered its appreciation to Dowling, now promoted to major, and his command, as a result of their battlefield prowess. In gratitude, the "ladies of Houston" presented the unit with specially struck medals. The medals were actually Mexican eight reale coins with both faces sanded down and with new information carved into them. They were inscribed "Sabine Pass, 1863” on one side, and had a Maltese Cross with the letters D and G on the other.

=== After the war and death ===
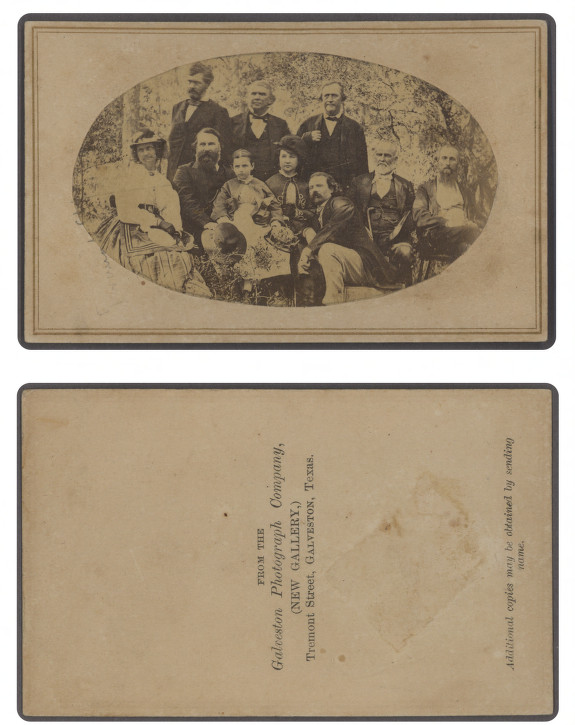
Major Richard Dowling, General James Longstreet, and unidentified veterans.

After the battle of Sabine Pass Dowling was elevated to hero status in his hometown of Houston. John Nova Lomax of the Houston Press stated that in that city "Dowling was treated something like Julius Caesar home from a punishing foray into Gaul." He subsequently served as a recruiter for the Confederacy and was personally commended for his action at the battle by Jefferson Davis. After the war Dowling returned to his saloon business in Houston and quickly became one of the city's leading businessmen. Dowling's promising future was cut short by another yellow fever epidemic which devastated Houston in the late summer of 1867, and he died on 23 September 1867.

He was buried at St. Vincent's Catholic Cemetery, the oldest Catholic cemetery in Houston.

== Legacy ==
Several places in Houston were named after Dowling. Lomax wrote in 2009 that by then very few people in the city memorialized him and that the group was "vanishing (if not downright extinct)". In regards to sites named after Dowling, Lomax stated that there have been objections to sites named after Dowling, "But this being Houston, where 1980 is ancient history, nothing is ever done." Two sites, now Emancipation Drive and Lawson Middle School (formerly Dowling Street and Dowling Middle School) have since been renamed.

=== Davis Guards Medal (1863) ===
The Davis Guards Medal was presented by the "ladies of Houston" in 1863 to the artillery company. It is regarded to be the only medal authorized for wear on the Confederate uniform. Of the 50 medals issued, only 3 are known to still exist. They are on display at the American Civil War Museum, Bullock Texas State History Museum, and Texas Military Forces Museum.

=== Thanks of Congress (1864) ===
On 8 February 1864, the officers and men of Company F (Davis Guards), 1st (Cook's) Texas Heavy Artillery Regiment, Confederate States Army, received the "thanks of Congress."

=== Dowling Street (1892) ===
In 1892, the Houston City Council renamed East Broadway to Dowling Street. On 11 January 2017, Houston City Council approved a plan to rename Dowling Street to Emancipation Avenue.

=== Tuam Street (1892) ===
In 1892, the Houston City Council renamed a street, which is perpendicular to Dowling Street (now Emancipation Avenue), to Tuam Street, the namesake of Dowling's birthplace Tuam, Ireland.

=== Southern Cross of Honor (1899) ===
Dowling was posthumously awarded the Southern Cross of Honor in 1899.

=== Statue (1905) ===
In 1905, the Houston City Council commissioned a statue of Dowling by Frank Teich for the Houston City Hall . It was relocated to Sam Houston Park in 1939 and Hermann Park near the Sam Houston Monument in 1958. In 2020 the City of Houston moved the statue into storage until a suitable place could be found to display it.

This was the first public monument commissioned by the city government; he was chosen as he fought in favor of the CSA.

==== Historical Marker (1998) ====
The site received a Historical Marker (#11938) by the Texas Historical Commission in 1998.

=== Obelisk (1935) ===
In October 1935, a granite obelisk was built near Dowling's grave at Saint Vincent's Cemetery in Houston. The plaque reads: "Near this spot lies LT DICK DOWLING Hero of the Battle of Sabine Pass".

=== Sabine Pass Battleground State Historic Site (1936) ===
The Sabine Pass Battleground State Historic Site is the location of the Defense of Sabine Pass, Texas. It is a heritage site operated by the Texas Historical Commission. It features a statue of Dowling and memorial dedicated to the Davis Guards from the State of Texas in 1936.

==== Dowling Road (1936) ====
Dowling Road leads to the Sabine Pass Battleground State Historic Site.

==== Historical Marker (1936) ====
The Sabine Pass Battleground State Historic Site received a Historical Marker (#10509) by the Texas Historical Commission in 1936.

=== Monument (1937) ===
In 1937, the United Daughters of the Confederacy a grey granite monument dedicated to Dowling in the center of the intersection of State Highway 87 and Broadway Street in downtown Sabine Pass, TX. It was relocated in the 1960s to a new location on State Highway.

=== Dick Dowling Elementary School (1953) ===
In March 1953, the Dick Dowling Elementary School was built and dedicated in Port Arthur, Texas. It was renamed to Port Acres Elementary School in October 2018.

=== Confederate Medal of Honor (1977) ===
Dowling was posthumously awarded the Confederate Medal of Honor in 1977.

=== Dowling Middle School (1968) ===
In 1968 the Richard W. "Dick" Dowling Middle School was built and dedicated in Houston, Texas. It is in the Hiram Clarke area of Southwest Houston. It was renamed to Audrey H. Lawson Middle School in May 2016.

=== Tuam Plaque (1998) ===
In 1998, the town of Tuam also placed a bronze memorial plaque of Dowling, bearing his image and explaining his feats, on the facade of Tuam Town Hall. It reads:

Major Richard W. (Dick) Dowling C.S.A., 1837-1867 Born Knock, Tuam; Settled Houston Texas, 1857; Outstanding business and civic leader; Joined Irish Davis Guards in American Civil War; With 47 men foiled Invasion of Texas by 5000 federal troops at Sabine Pass, 8 Sept 1863, a feat of superb gunnery; formed first oil company in Texas; Died aged 30 of yellow fever. This plaque was unveiled by Col. J.B. Collerain 31 May 1998

An independent member of Tuam municipal district council proposed removing the plaque at the council's September 2017 meeting, in the light of the 2017 Charlottesville disturbances. Nobody seconded the motion; a Fianna Fáil councillor said the plaque commemorated Dowling's business career and Tuam had "more important things going on".

=== Bibliography ===
- Collins, Timothy. 'Dick Dowling: Galway's hero of Confederate Texas', by Timothy Collins and Ann Caraway Ivins; foreword by Edward T. Cotham Jr. Kilnaboy: Old Forge Books, 2013.
- Cotham, Edward T. Jr. 'Battle on the Bay: the Civil War struggle for Galveston', by Edward T. Cotham Jr. Austin: University of Texas Press, 1998.
- Cotham, Edward T. Jr. 'Sabine Pass: the Confederacy's Thermopylae', by Edward T. Cotham Jr. Austin: University of Texas Press, 2004.
- Cotham, Edward T. Jr, ed. The Southern journey of a Civil War marine: the illustrated note-book of Henry O. Gusley, edited and annotated by Edward T. Cotham Jr. Austin: University of Texas Press, 2006.

=== Gallery ===
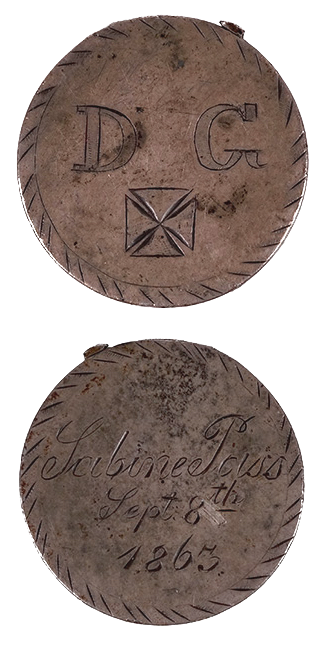
Davis Guards Medal, 1864

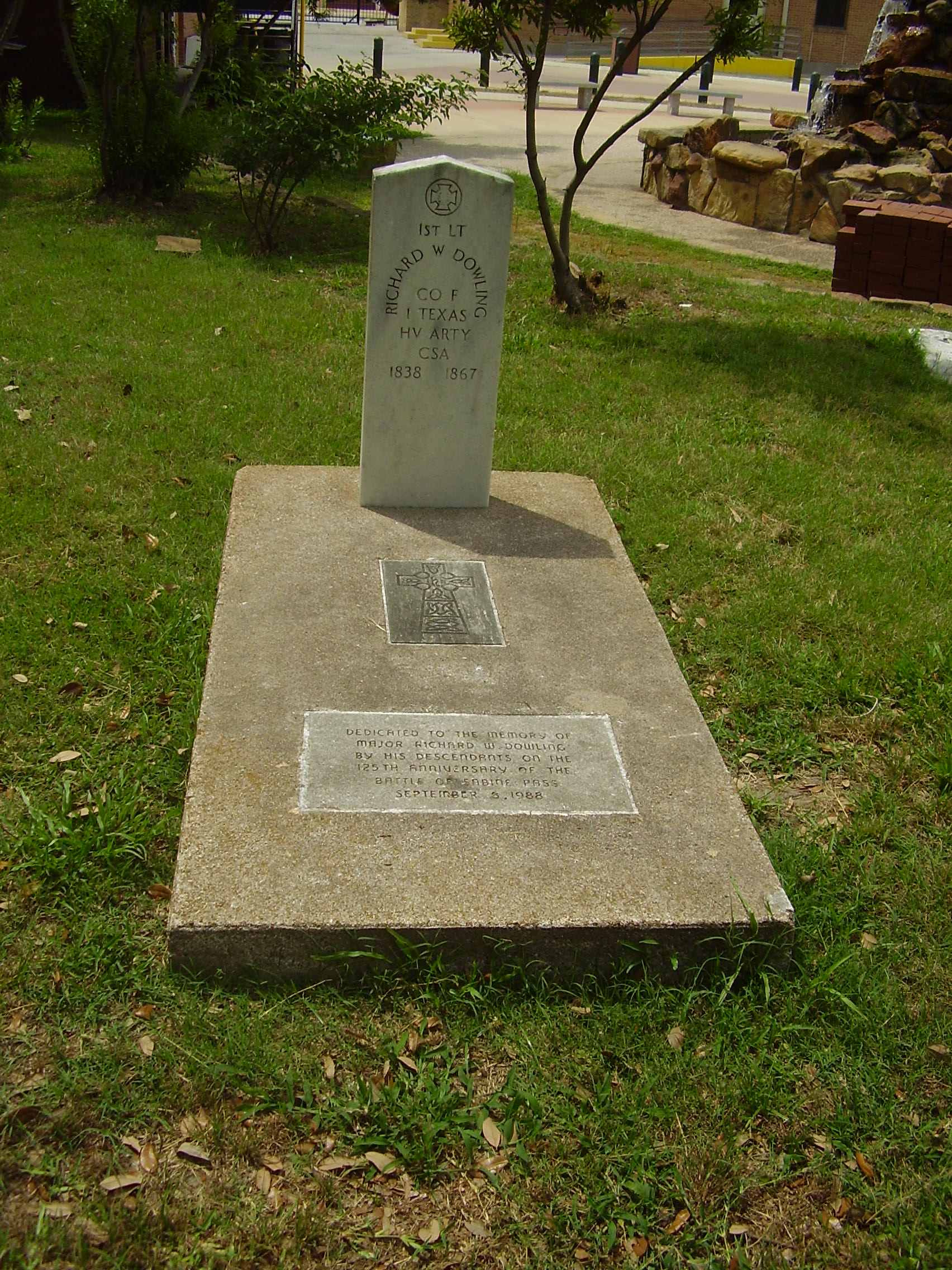
Grave, St. Vincent's Cemetery, 1867

Richard Dowling Memorial Statue, 1905

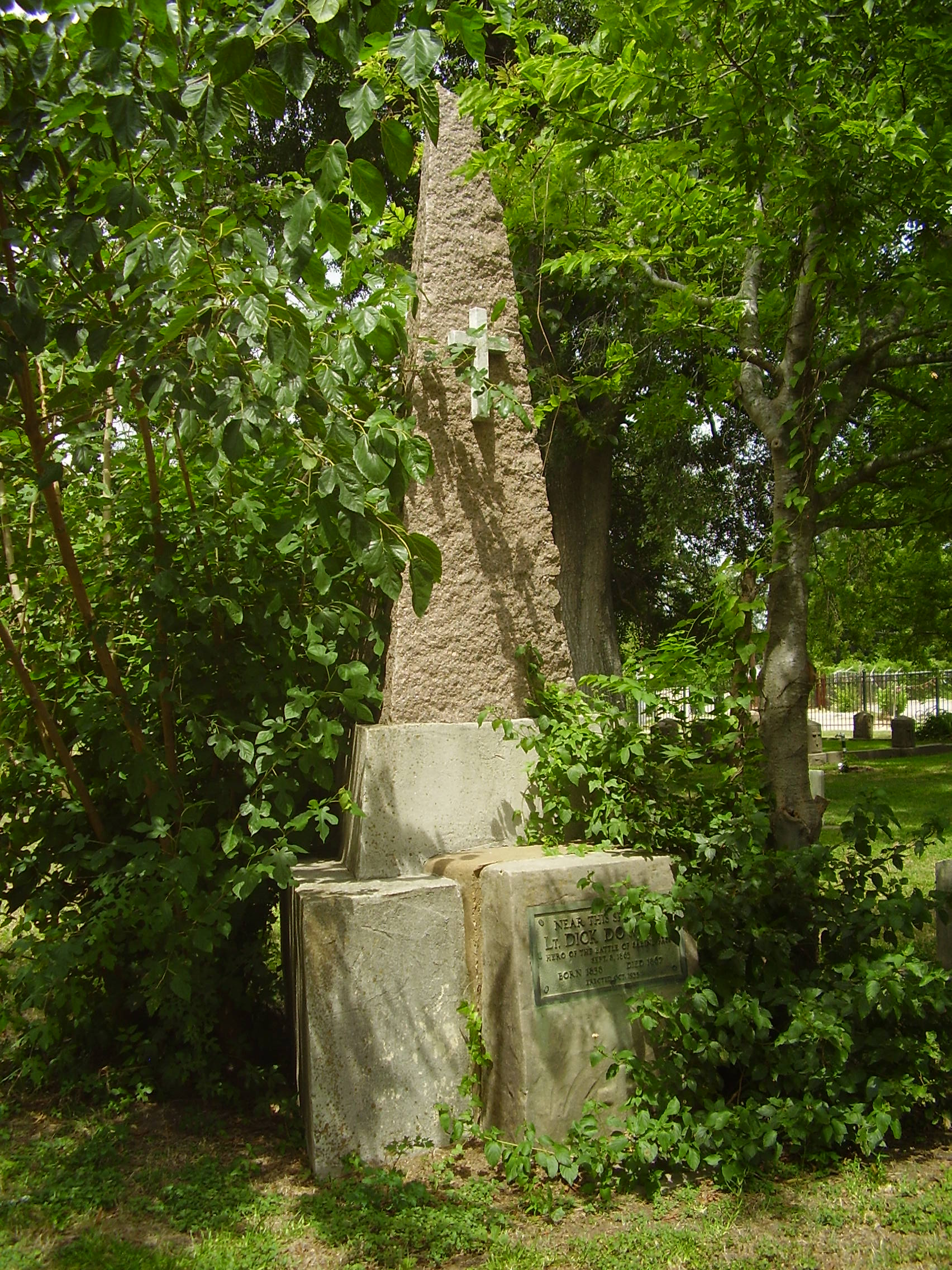
Obelisk, St. Vincent's Cemetery, 1935

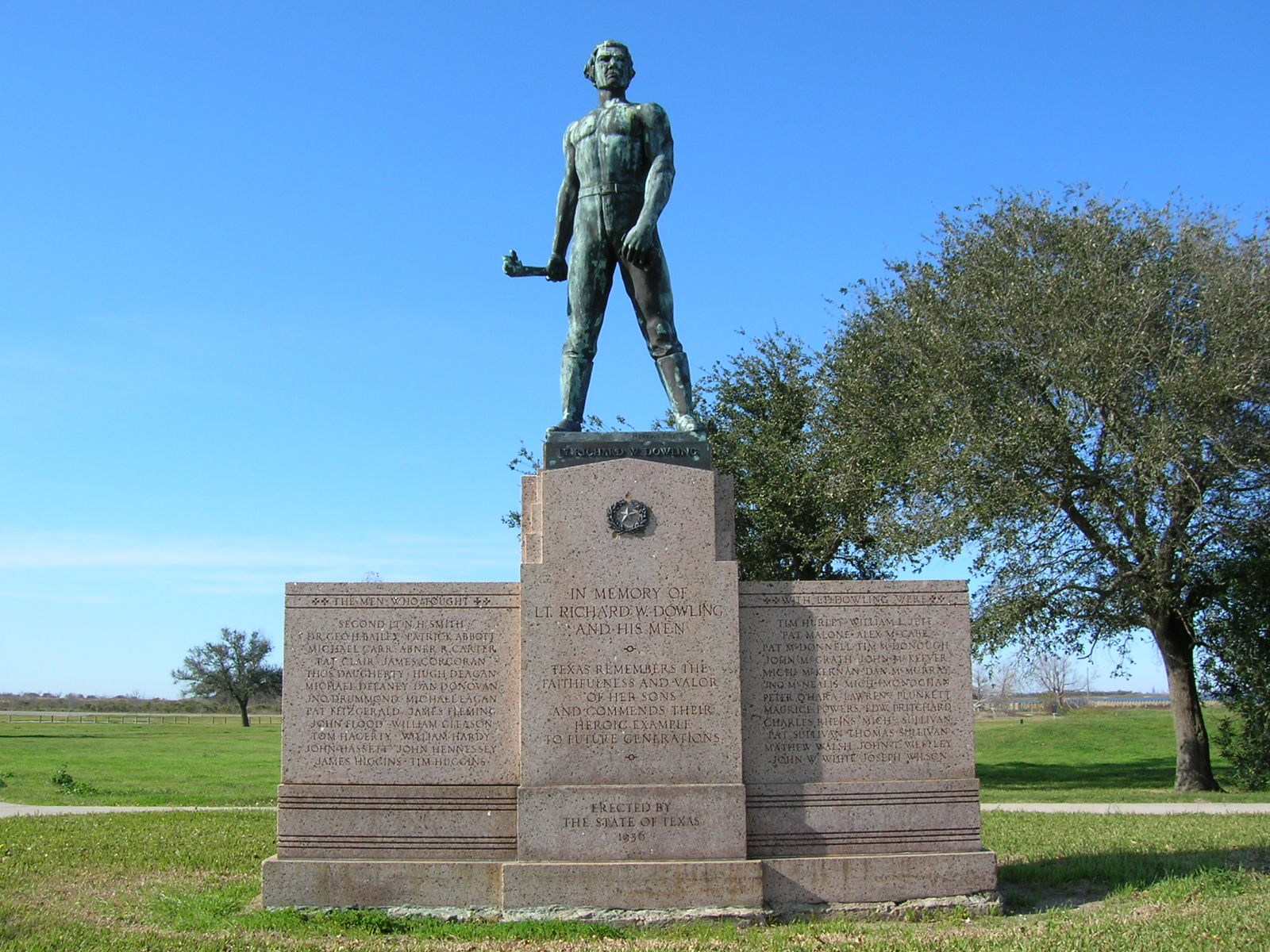
Sabine Pass Battleground State Historic Site, 1936

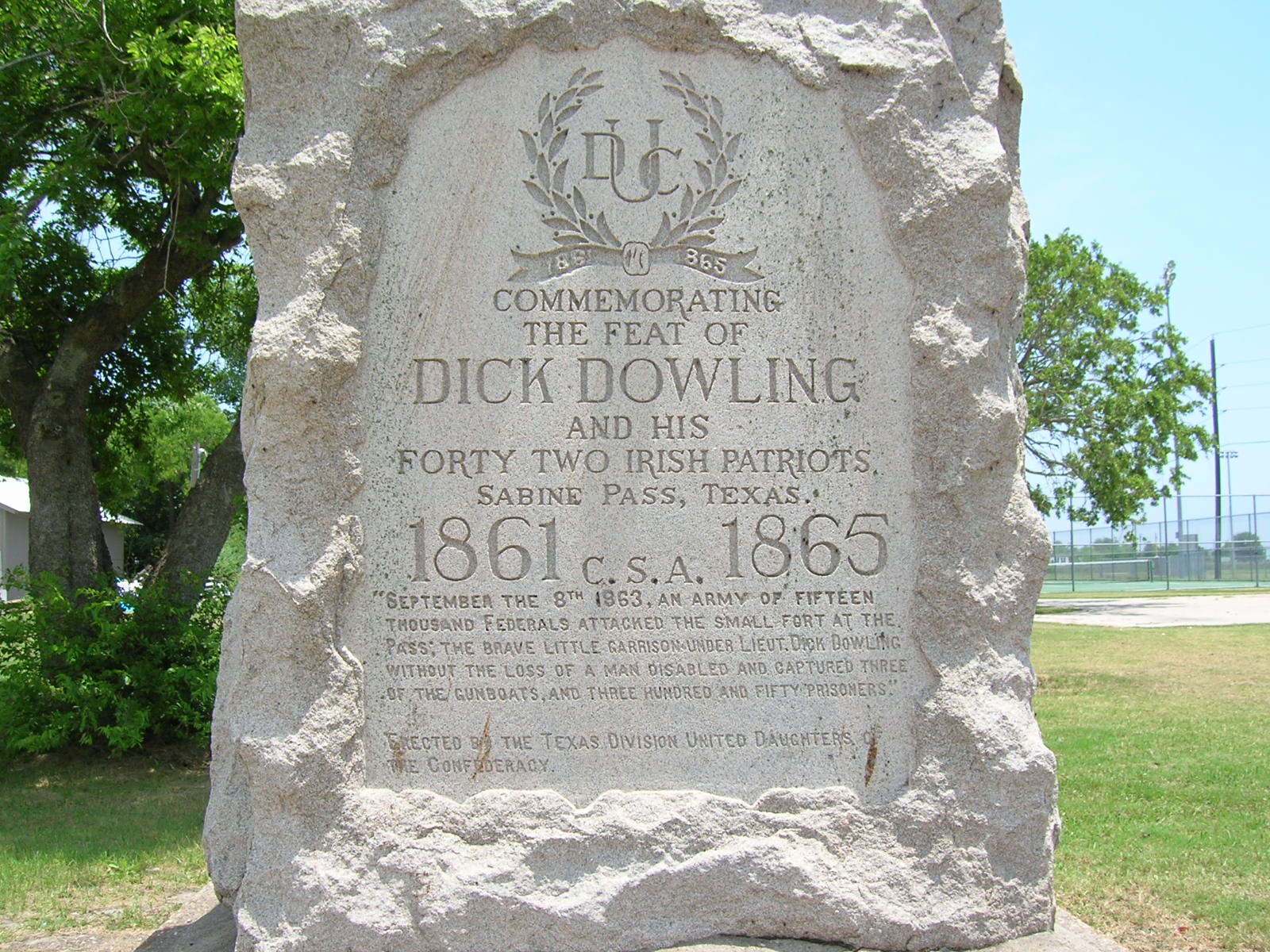
UDC Memorial, Sabine Pass, 1937

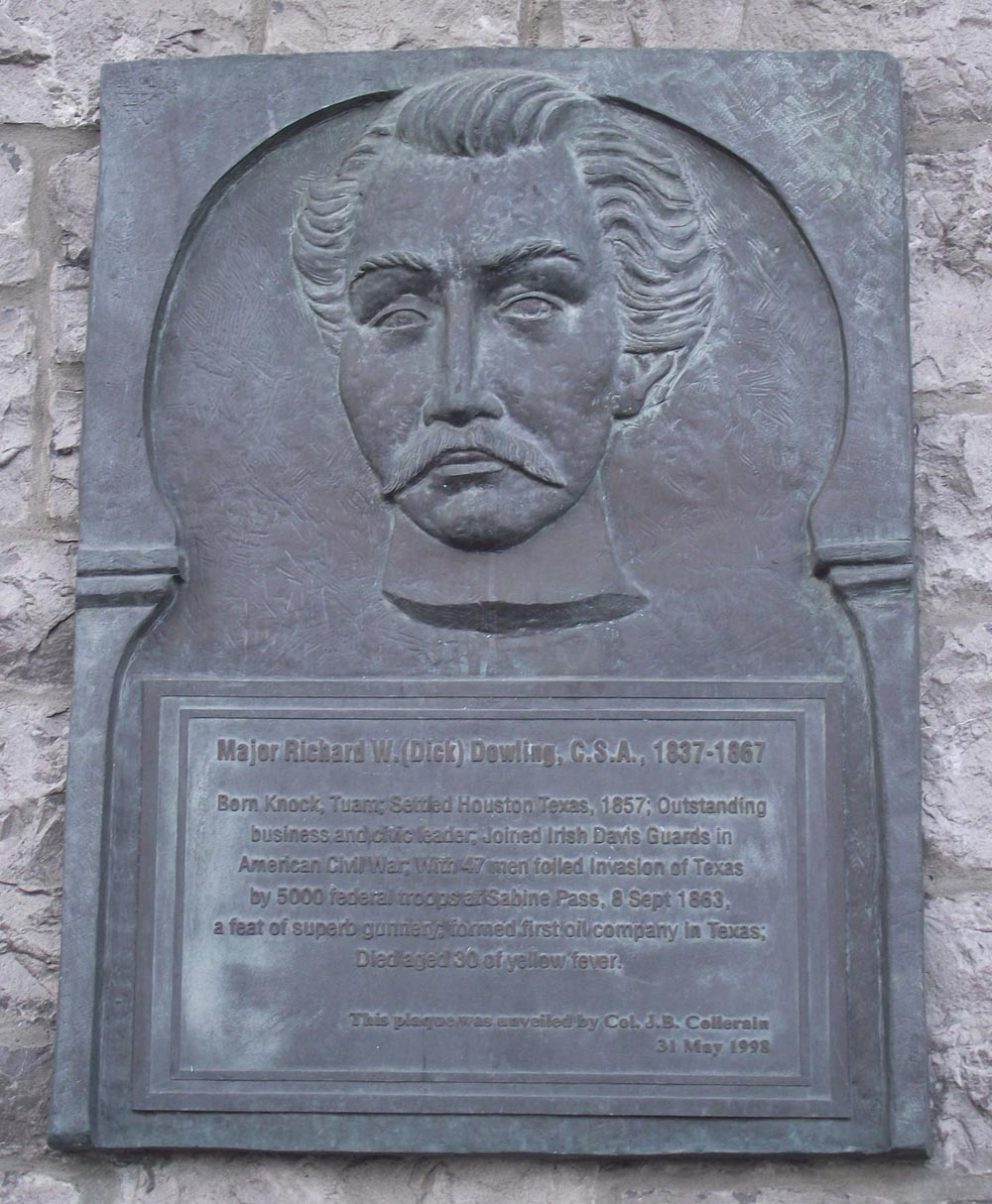
Plaque, Tuam, 1998
