= Quicksand, Texas =

Unincorporated community in Texas, US

- Unincorporated community
- Interactive map of Quicksand, Texas
- Coordinates: 30.8826991°N 93.7137885°W
- Country: United States
- State: Texas
- County: Newton
- Elevation: 203 ft (62 m)

Quicksand is an unincorporated community in Newton County, Texas, United States. Situated on Texas State Highway 87 and Farm to Market Road 1414, it is named for Quicksand Creek, a nearby waterbody. An agricultural and logging community, it was designated as the first county seat of Newton County, for it was thought to be the geographic center of Newton County. The home of military officer Josephus S. Irvine was made the meeting place of county officials. In 1848, the county seat was transferred to Burkeville—transferred to Newton in 1853—due to land disputes and the fact Quicksand was not the geographic center. In summer 1871, for one month, a post office operated in the community.
