= USS Wave (1863) =

Gunboat of the United States Navy

History

United States
- Ordered: as Argosy No. 2
- Laid down: date unknown
- Launched: 1863
- Acquired: 14 November 1863
- In service: early 1864
- Out of service: 6 May 1864
- Stricken: 1865 (est.)
- Captured: by Confederate forces; 6 May 1864
- Fate: unknown

General characteristics
- Displacement: 229 tons
- Length: not known
- Beam: not known
- Draught: not known
- Propulsion: steam engine; side wheel-propelled
- Speed: not known
- Complement: not known
- Armament: six guns
- Armour: tinclad

USS Wave was a steamer acquired by the Union Navy during the American Civil War. She was used by the Union Navy as a gunboat in support of the Union Navy blockade of Confederate waterways until she was herself captured by Confederate forces.

== Argosy No. 2 constructed in Pennsylvania, renamed Wave ==
Argosy No. 2, a sidewheel steamboat built in 1863 at Monongahela, Pennsylvania, was acquired by the Navy on 14 November 1863, renamed Wave, and converted to a "tinclad" gunboat.

== Assigned to the West Gulf Blockade ==
Early in 1864, she was assigned to the West Gulf Blockading Squadron and took up her initial station off New Orleans, Louisiana.

=== Participating in the Calcasieu River expedition ===
On 15 April, she received orders to shift to Calcasieu Pass at the mouth of the Calcasieu River in southwestern Louisiana. She arrived there on 24 April and entered the mouth of the river in company with USS Granite City to collect Confederate renegades for service in the Navy and to round up all the arms, saddles, and harness in the area that could be utilized for military purposes by the Confederacy.

=== Under attack, Wave and Granite City captured by Confederates ===
At daybreak on 6 May, while riding at anchor in the river, the two ships were surprised by the entire Sabine Pass garrison. Granite City surrendered about 45 minutes later, but Wave fought on for another 45 minutes until, her engines and moveable guns disabled and eight of her crew wounded, she found herself unable to continue the struggle. Accordingly, her crew destroyed documents and materiel on board, and her commanding officer surrendered Wave to the Southerners.

== In service as a cargo ship by the Confederates ==
The Confederates employed the vessel as a cargo steamer. Her ultimate disposition is unknown, but she was probably destroyed by retreating Confederate forces.

== See also ==
- Confederate States Navy
