= The Raft (short story) =

Short story by Stephen King

- Short story by Stephen King
- Country: United States
- Language: English
- Genres: Horror, short story

Publication
- Published in: Gallery (1st release); The Twilight Zone Magazine; Skeleton Crew
- Publication type: Magazine
- Media type: Print (Periodical & Paperback)
- Publication date: 1982

"The Raft" is a horror short story by Stephen King. It was first published as a booklet included with Gallery in November 1982, then in The Twilight Zone Magazine in June 1983, and was collected in King's 1985 collection Skeleton Crew.

== Plot summary ==
Four students from Horlicks University – Randy, Deke, Rachel, and LaVerne – swim to a wooden raft on a remote Pennsylvania lake in October as a final outing before winter. Randy notices a mysterious black substance floating on the surface that appears to chase the girls as they reach the raft. Deke and LaVerne ridicule Randy's suspicions until Rachel remarks on the beautiful bands of colors on the patch's oily surface and touches it. The black patch pulls her into the water, coats her, begins to dissolve her and finally, wholly envelops her. The horrified trio helplessly watch as she is devoured, expanding the size of the black shape.

After the initial panic, the three contemplate their situation. They realize swimming past the black substance is not possible, as it moves too fast. The group told no one else about their outing and drove eight miles from the nearest main road, so they cannot hope to be rescued. Their only option is to wait and see if the thing leaves. Gazing at the creature's beautifully iridescent surface entrances and disorients the onlookers, nearly causing them to fall off the raft. When the creature floats under the raft, Deke prepares to make a desperate jump into the lake to swim to the shore. But the creature oozes up through two boards and grabs him by his foot, pulling his leg through the crack in the boards. Randy and LaVerne are forced to watch as Deke is devoured and dragged through the crack, slowly and laboriously. LaVerne faints, and Randy fights to maintain his sanity. Randy contemplates swimming to shore while the creature eats Deke but realizes that means he would have to leave the unconscious LaVerne behind.

After LaVerne regains consciousness, she and Randy take turns sitting, standing, and watching the creature, allowing brief moments of rest for one while the other watches for when the black patch goes under the raft. At night, LaVerne convinces Randy that they should sit and watch it together. As the temperature drops, the two slowly embrace for warmth and gradually begin to have sex, Randy assuring her that he will keep an eye on the creature. However, he is distracted by the hypnotic colors of the creature and, when LaVerne's hair falls over the side of the raft, the creature tangles itself in her hair and flows over her face. Knowing he will be unable to save her, he kicks her over the side of the raft in a panic, quickening her death.

Randy barely gets any sleep as night falls, since the creature flows under the raft every time Randy tries to sit down, forcing him to remain permanently standing. Randy finally breaks down and gives up, acknowledging the hopelessness of the situation. He fantasizes about rescue and sings deliriously, suffering from extreme fatigue. At last, Randy turns to the creature and contemplates if the creature's hypnotizing colors will take the pain out of being consumed. Randy does not look away as the creature's colors shimmer at him.

== Film adaptation ==
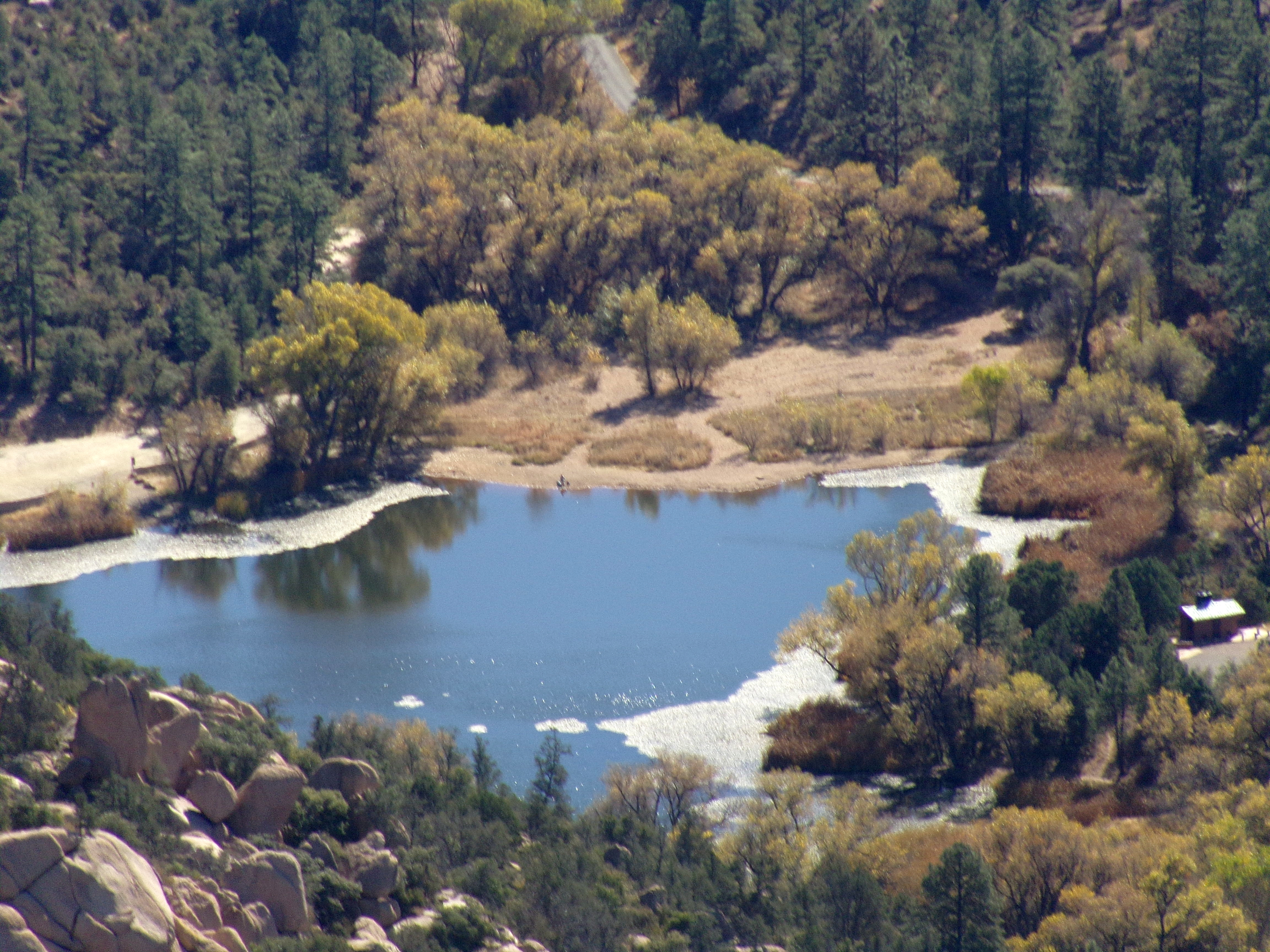
The adaptation of "The Raft" for Creepshow 2 was filmed at Granite Basin Lake.

"The Raft" was adapted to film as a segment of the 1987 horror anthology film Creepshow 2, directed by Michael Gornick from a screenplay by George A. Romero.

The bulk of the story is faithful to the short story, but the ending was changed for the film. When the creature takes LaVerne, Randy makes a swim for shore and is quickly pursued. Crawling out to apparent safety a few feet from the water's edge, he yells "I beat you! Whatever you are, I beat you!". The creature then becomes a wave and engulfs him. As the creature slides back down into the lake, the screen pans over a no-swimming sign that also features a warning, which was hidden in overgrown reeds, near the now-abandoned Camaro.

This segment of the film was filmed at Granite Basin Lake in Prescott, Arizona.

== Background ==
In the intro to the story in The Twilight Zone Magazine and in afterword to the book Skeleton Crew, King relates an anecdote about the story's possible 1969 publication in Adam magazine in different form, under the title "The Float". A short time after the story was accepted, King was arrested in the town of Orono, Maine, for removing traffic cones from the street after one of them had damaged his car. He was unable to pay the fine and was about to be jailed when the payment check for "The Float" arrived, an event King referred to as akin to "have someone send you a real Get Out of Jail Free card." Despite receiving payment, King has never located a copy of the magazine with the published story in it.

== Reception ==
Reviewing Skeleton Crew for The New York Times, Susan Bolotin called the story "wonderfully gruesome".

== See also ==
- Stephen King short fiction bibliography
