= The Granites =

The Granites may refer to.

- The Granites, a former name for Yundamindera, Western Australia
- The Granites Airport, an airport in the Northern Territory, Australia
- The Granites gold mine, a mine in the Northern Territory, Australia
- The Granites, (Humboldt County), a mountain range in Nevada, United States

== See also ==
- Granite (disambiguation)
