= Sabine Pass Independent School District =

School district in Texas, United States

Address
- 5641 South Gulfway Drive Sabine Pass, Texas, 77655; United States

District information
- Type: Public
- Grades: PK–12
- Schools: 1
- NCES District ID: 4838490

Students and staff
- Students: 358 (2023–2024)
- Teachers: 33.35 (on an FTE basis) (2023–2024)
- Staff: 35.73 (on an FTE basis) (2023–2024)
- Student–teacher ratio: 10.73 (2023–2024)

Other information
- Website: www.sabinepass.net

Sabine Pass Independent School District is a public school district in Sabine Pass, a community in Port Arthur, Texas (USA). The school serves sections of Port Arthur and unincorporated Jefferson County.

The district has one school that serves students in grades early childhood through twelve. As of 2020, the graduating class sizes have all been between 30 and 40.

In 2019, the school district received an "A" overall performance grade by the Texas Education Agency.
