= Sabine Pass, Port Arthur, Texas =

Historic neighborhood of Port Arthur, Texas, United States

Coordinates: 29°44′06″N 93°53′51″W

Sabine Pass
- Interactive map of Sabine Pass
- Country: United States
- State: Texas
- County: Jefferson
- Neighborhood of: Port Arthur
- Settled: 1832
- Incorporated: June 15, 1861
- Annexed by Port Arthur: April 2, 1978
- Time zone: Central
  - Summer (DST): Central
- Zip Code: 77640
- Area code: 409

Location of Sabine Pass

Sabine Pass is a neighborhood in Port Arthur, Texas. It had been incorporated in 1861 before being formally annexed by Port Arthur in 1978. However, Sabine Pass retains its own distinct identity with its own school district, post office, and port authority. The Port Arthur Convention and Visitors Bureau stated that Sabine Pass is "often regarded as" being a "self-contained" community.

Sabine Pass was the site of two naval battles, the First Battle of Sabine Pass, and the Second Battle of Sabine Pass, as well as land skirmishes that occurred around the historic Sabine Pass Lighthouse during the Civil War.

== History ==
In 1832, Thomas Corts (of England) and John McGaffey (of New Hampshire) were among the first settlers of the Sabine Pass area. Stephen Hendrickson Everitt (1806–1844) wrote a letter to Republic of Texas President Mirabeau B. Lamar on March 11, 1839, seeking to establish a post office in the area. A Republic of Texas custom's house, established in 1837, and a United States customs house at Garrison Ridge were already active, and the nearest post office was 40 miles away. On October 19, 1839, Everitt, representing John Bevil, filed an intention with Chief Justice Palmer in Jasper County to form a city to be known as City of the Pass with 1600 acres and 2500 lots, but was unsuccessful. Some confusion exists whether this was Sabine Pass that he had previously written about or an intended city to the south. Records also indicate that in 1839, Sam Houston, along with Philip Sublette and associates, laid out what is referred to as "the first townsite of Sabine", containing 2,060 lots, with Niles F. Smith as the agent. Niles was appointed collector of revenue for the port of Sabine 1842. Philip Sublett and Houston were friends and associates. Houston stayed with Sublett while recuperating from wound received at San Jacinto. In 1836, Sublett nominated Houston for president of the Republic of Texas.

According to the Adams-Onis Treaty, the Louisiana boundary was "to landfall" on the west bank of the Sabine River, but a border dispute still existed between the United States and the Republic of Texas. The U.S. claimed jurisdiction down the Sabine River to the Gulf of Mexico. while Texas claimed it ended at the Sabine River delta. By 1838, the U.S. assigned the revenue cutter USRC Woodbury to patrol the Sabine Lake as part of the Gulf of Mexico patrol. By 1844, the Republic of Texas had the Santa Anna patrolling the area. One instance occurred that could have led to war between the United States and the Republic of Texas. The Santa Anna had instructed two schooners loading cotton to stop at the customs house to pay a tonnage fee. The customs house had two cannons, and when the schooners attempted to run the customs port, the agent fired a warning shot across the bow of each ship and then six more in an attempt to sink them. Both schooners weighed anchor and settled the matter.

=== Community name ===
The name of the community evolved over time from City of Sabine, to Sabine City, and then to Sabine Pass. Although requested in 1839, and a steam lumber mill was in the community in 1846, a post office was not established until 1847, as the Sabine City Post Office. In 1841, William Kennedy, in The Rise, Progress and Prospects of the Republic of Texas (published in London in 1841), mentioned the settlement of the area and wrote, "Taylor's creek, a small stream that enters Sabine Bay from the west, a few miles above the city of Sabine ...", By not capitalizing "city" it appears that the city was named Sabine. No records indicate that the settlement was ever called just "Sabine" so this might have been referring to the name of the place as "City of Sabine". There is reference that General J. B. Magruder, "ordered construction of a major fortification of five redoubts seven miles west of Sabine City ..." in 1863, but Sabine Pass was incorporated on June 15, 1861.

=== Sabine Pass and the Civil War ===
During the American Civil War, Fort Manhassett, Fort Sabine, and Fort Griffin (not to be confused with the later frontier fort) were built by the Confederacy to protect the waterway of Sabine Pass, the Sabine River, and the Neches River under General J. B. Magruder.

Two battles, the First and the Second Battle of Sabine Pass, both occurred around the Sabine Lake estuary, in Sabine Pass, between the southern end of the current community of Sabine Pass, Texas, and the Sabine Pass Lighthouse on the Louisiana side. In 1970, construction crews attempting to repair SH-87 accidentally dug up Civil War era ammunition. The following is an excerpt from Texas State Highway 87:

In 1970, road machinery used in its construction accidentally dug up several cannonballs and crumbling kegs of black powder about 10 miles west of Sabine Pass. Further excavation eventually produced more kegs of black powder and several hundred cannonballs. The ammunition had been buried there by Confederate soldiers in what were the diches of Fort Manhassett in 1865. Fort Manhassett was a series of earthworks constructed by the Confederacy in 1863 to defend the western approaches to Sabine Pass.

=== After the Civil War ===
The expectations of the earlier settlers, as well as the founders of Sabine Pass, never materialized. By 1895, Arthur Stilwell had original plans for the southern terminus of the Kansas City, Pittsburg and Gulf Railroad Company to be Sabine Pass, but the Kountze brothers, who owned the land Stilwell needed for the railroad, refused to make a deal, so Port Arthur was born. Port Arthur annexed Sabine Pass in 1978.

== Geography ==
The community lies along State Highway 87 at Sabine Pass, 30 miles southeast of Beaumont in extreme southeastern Jefferson County. Sabine Pass is outside of the Jefferson County levee system, which protects other communities in the county.

=== Hurricanes ===
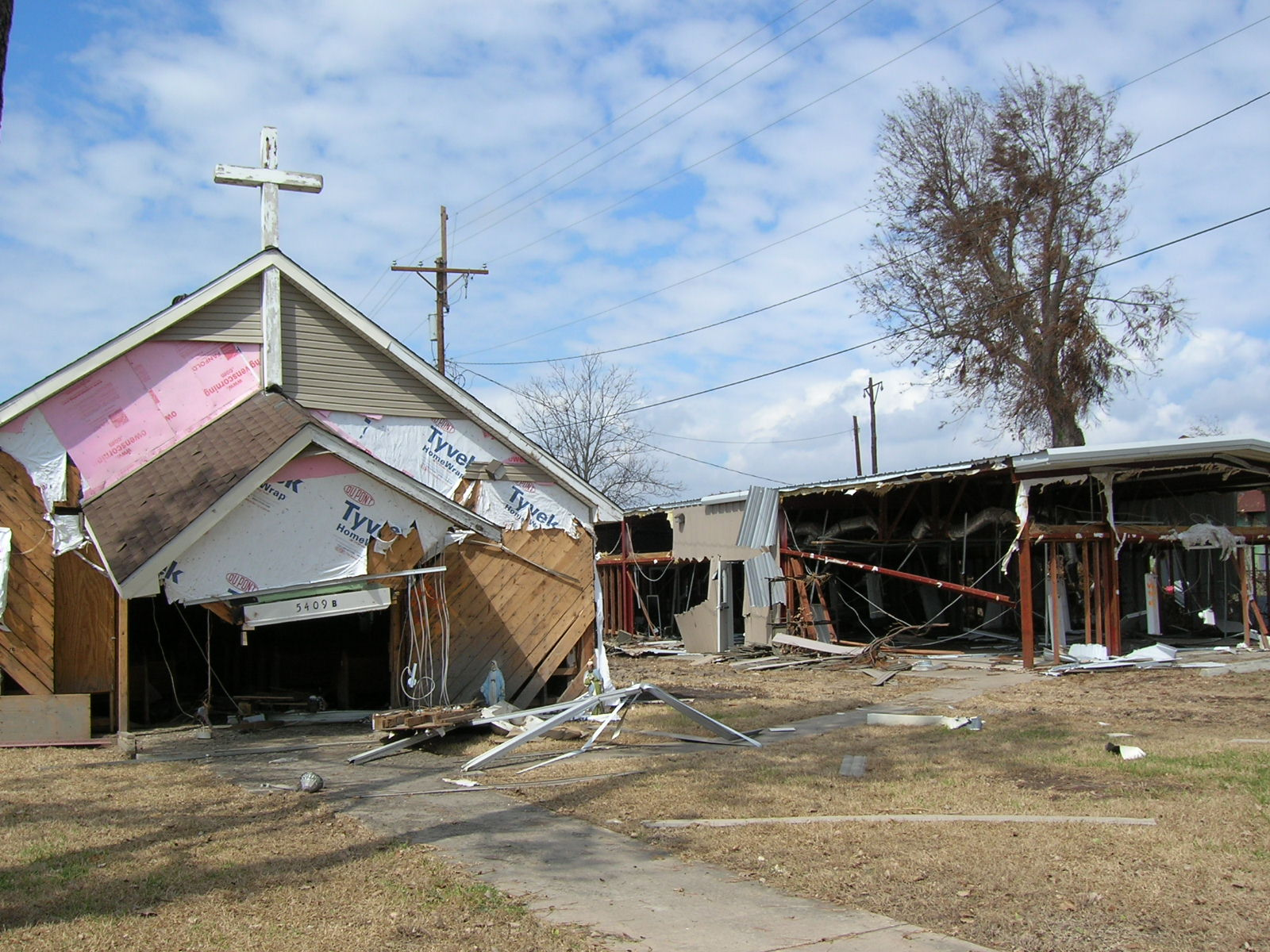
Church and building severely damaged by Hurricane Ike

Because of the short distance separating Sabine Pass from the Gulf of Mexico, the city has suffered greatly from numerous hurricanes since its founding. After hurricanes in 1886, 1900, 1915, and the devastating Hurricane Audrey in 1957, economic development moved north from Sabine Pass to the cities of Beaumont, Port Arthur, and Orange, which still dominate the area's economy today.

On September 24, 2005, Hurricane Rita came ashore over Sabine Lake—the surge from the storm destroyed more than 90% of the structures in Sabine Pass. In February 2006, the team from Extreme Makeover: Home Edition visited the town and rebuilt the firehouse (which included a new firetruck worth $400,000), the high school auditorium and gave dozens of families $350 gift cards from Sears to replace items such as clothes, space heaters, blankets etc., lost due to Hurricane Rita. This town was featured in the Extreme Makeover: Home Edition - After the Storm Texas Special, which aired on the ABC on April 14, 2006. Adam Saunders, a spokesperson for the City of Port Arthur, said that of the 225 houses in Sabine Pass, 20% of them were livable after Rita hit there.

In September 2008, Hurricane Ike struck Galveston and managed to generate the highest surge ever recorded at Sabine Pass. Saunders said that a fewer number of houses remained livable after Ike than after Rita. Cindy Horswell of the McClatchy - Tribune Business News said that Sabine Pass was "among those hardest hit" by Hurricane Ike. Some 225 families lived in Sabine Pass before Ike, and in January 2009, Steve Fitzgibbons, the city manager of the City of Port Arthur, estimated that at that time, half of the families had returned to Sabine Pass after Ike. Fire station #4, the one built by Extreme Makeover: Home Edition, was destroyed by Ike, and FEMA provided funding for a new fire station. The new station, built 12 feet above sea level and able to withstand 150 mile-per-hour winds, was dedicated in August 2013.

== Arts and culture ==
Sabine Pass Battleground State Historic Site is an outdoor sculpture park that covers the history of the Sabine Pass Battleground during the Civil War. The park features an interpretive pavilion and walkway, a 14-foot statue and monument, ADA-accessible sidewalks and restrooms, covered picnic tables and grills, four-lane boat ramps with ADA-accessible dock, and 1/4 mile of shoreline with safety railing.

== Wildlife habitats ==
Sabine Pass is known for its wildlife. Sea Rim State Park and McFaddin National Wildlife Refuge lie at the end of Highway 87. The two provide excellent wildlife and especially bird-watching venues. Camping on the Gulf of Mexico beach at Sea Rim State Park is a popular attraction.

== Government and infrastructure ==
While Port Arthur annexed Sabine Pass in 1978, the census of the two began to be enumerated together since the 1990s. While Sabine Pass has a separate school district, post office, water district, and port authority, it is incorporated into the city of Port Arthur. Police and fire protection are provided by the Port Arthur city government.

=== Legislative districts ===
- State Board of Education, District 007
- Texas House of Representatives, District 021
- Texas Senate, District 017
- U.S. House of Representatives, District 002

== Education ==
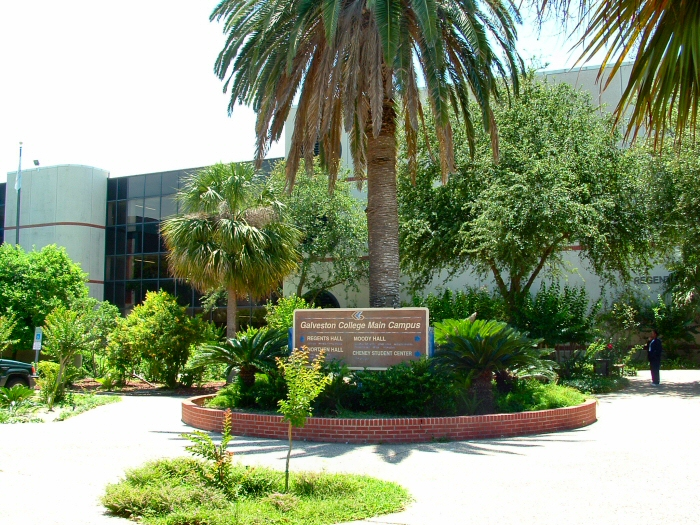
Galveston College

Sabine Pass Independent School District serves the community. The Sabine Pass School District is assigned to Galveston College in Galveston.

== See also ==
- Beaumont-Port Arthur metropolitan area
