= Granit =

Granit may refer to:

== Brands and companies ==
- Ab Granit Oy, a former Finnish granite quarrying and construction company (1886–1964) also known as Granit
- Granit (beer), a Swedish lager beer
- Granit Films, a French film production company
- P-700 Granit, a Soviet and Russian naval anti-ship cruise missile

== Places ==
- Granit, Bulgaria, a village in southern Bulgaria
- Le Granit Regional County Municipality, Quebec, a regional county municipality in the Estrie region of eastern Quebec, Canada

== Other uses ==
- Granit (name), a given name and surname; includes list of people with the name
- Granit oak, an oak tree in Granit, Bulgaria
- Granite, a type of rock

== See also ==
- Lannion–Côte de Granit Airport in France

== See also ==
- Granite (disambiguation)
