= Frederick Crocker =

American Civil War Union Navy Commander

- Born: April 7, 1821; Brockton, Massachusetts, United States
- Died: February 3, 1911 (aged 89); Montevideo, Uruguay
- Military career
- Allegiance: United States
- Branch: Union Navy
- Service years: 1861–1865
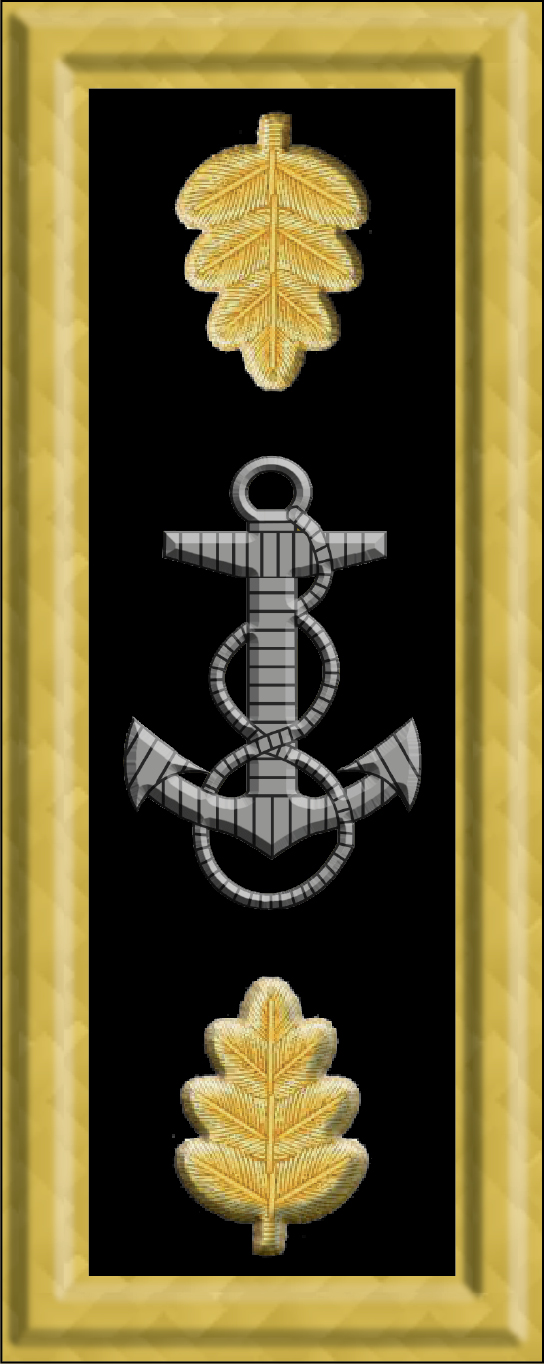
- Rank: Lieutenant Commander
- Commands: USS Kensington; USS Clifton
- Conflicts: American Civil War; First Battle of Sabine Pass; Second Battle of Sabine Pass
- Other work: US Consul at Montevideo (1876–1879); Marine insurance surveyor for Lloyd's of London and Bureau Veritas; Journalist and political pundit

Frederick Crocker (1821–1911) was an American naval commander for the Union during the US Civil War and US consul.

== Biography ==
=== Early life ===
Crocker was born in 1821 in Brockton, Massachusetts. Attracted by the adventure and opportunities of a life at sea, he joined a whaling company in New Bedford at 17.

=== Adult life ===
Crocker was captain of a whaling vessel at the age of 24. He hunted whales in the most remote waters of the globe for 13 years. Starting in 1851, he joined the American merchant marine serving as captain of clipper ships, carrying cargo and passengers to the East Asia and San Francisco.

At age 34, he married the daughter of a wealthy Vineyard whaler in Liverpool England. With the arrival of two sons and a daughter in 1856–1860, he remained closer to the family home in Edgartown, Martha's Vineyard. By 1860, he had become captain and part owner of a passenger and cargo steamer, the R.R. Cuyler, which sailed along the East Coast of North America between New York City and Savannah, Georgia, and was reputed for its speed.

=== Civil War ===
At age 40, Crocker volunteered for service in the Union Navy in the first weeks of the conflict. He served on the Mississippi and along the U.S. coast of the Gulf of Mexico and distinguished himself in battles and incidents at Apalachicola Bay, Sabine Pass, Calcasieu River, Camp Bisland and Butte-à-la-Rose, among others.

His service included a six-day, 80-mile dash through enemy-held Louisiana in October 1862. He and his party captured the senior Confederate officer in the Calcasieu area, gained possession of eight enemy vessels (one of them single-handedly), defeated rebel infantry, burned their encampment, fought off a cavalry attack, destroyed a bridge and stores, and returned safely without a single casualty. He also picked up refugees and took hostages, destroying a considerable amount of private property and capturing a large number of cotton bales. In recognition of his initiative, Rear-Admiral David G. Farragut recommended him for promotion.

Crocker is more known as the Union Navy commander who suffered an unexpected defeat at Sabine Pass, Texas, on September 8, 1863. With a squadron of four gunboats carrying hundreds of sharpshooters and sailors, he attacked Fort Griffin head-on. While over five thousand Union troops on twenty transport ships stood by, he was defeated and captured along with 300 men by the opposing rebel force. His gunboat became an easy target when its wheel rope was shot away, and its hull stuck fast on a mud bank. His gunboat's boiler took a direct hit. The main invasion force had taken all launches. His men could not disembark, and dozens drowned. The commanding Union General, who believed the entire expedition unwise, froze at the critical moment and then withdrew. The book Sabine Pass: The Confederacy's Thermopylae by Edward T. Cotham (2004) makes numerous references to Crocker for his actions during the naval blockade by the Union Navy.

Despite the efforts of his superiors to obtain his release, Crocker spent 17 months as a prisoner of war, mainly at Camp Ford, in Tyler, Texas. Hundreds of prisoners died from exposure, illness, and malnutrition, but the sailors under his leadership remained loyal to the Union. As soon as he was freed, he attempted to obtain the release of all African American servicemen still held prisoners at Camp Ford.

Crocker ultimately rose to the rank of Acting Volunteer Lieutenant Commander and was cited on three different accounts—gallantry, and meritorious and faithful services—making him the only U.S. Navy officer to win these three distinctions in the Civil War. He was awarded at least two Confederate flags (at Sabine Pass and Butte-à-la-Rose). At one point he resigned from the navy only to be lured back by Farragut. He formally denounced Major-General Benjamin F. Butler, then the supreme Union military commander at New Orleans, for corruption. Later in his career, he lost his diplomatic post after refusing to contribute to the presidential campaign of the allegedly corrupt James G. Blaine, Governor of Maine and Secretary of State.

=== Post war ===
After the Civil War, Crocker resigned from the Navy. Business took him for a short spell to Chicago. At 47 years of age and in weakened health from his many months in prison camp, he decided to leave the United States with his family and two brothers-in-law. He started a new life in Uruguay.

While in Uruguay, he was first involved in the ice trade. For over two years (1876–79) he served as US Consul at Montevideo under the Grant administration. He continued to serve in the consulate until 1886. For 20 years, he was the marine insurance surveyor for both Lloyd's of London and Bureau Veritas (an American insurance company) in Montevideo. He was also a journalist for a British periodical and a political pundit in the Montevideo and Buenos Aires English-language newspapers.

=== Death ===
Crocker died in Montevideo at the age of 89 years, and his remains are buried in The British Cemetery. His son and two grandsons established an import company in Montevideo. His great-granddaughter, Fay Crocker, was an LPGA golfer and winner of two majors and holds several golf records.
