= First Battle of Sabine Pass =

Part of the American Civil War

Coordinates: 29.7359°N 93.8711°W

- Part of the Trans-Mississippi Theater of the American Civil War
Date	September 24–25, 1862
Location	Jefferson County, Texas
Result	Union victory

Belligerents
United States (Union)	(Confederate States of America) Confederate States (Confederacy)

Commanders and leaders
Frederick Crocker	Josephus S. Irvine

Units involved
West Gulf Blockading Squadron	Sabine Pass Garrison

Strength
2 schooners, 1 steamer	28 artillerists ~30 cavalry four guns Fort Sabine

Casualties and losses
None	None

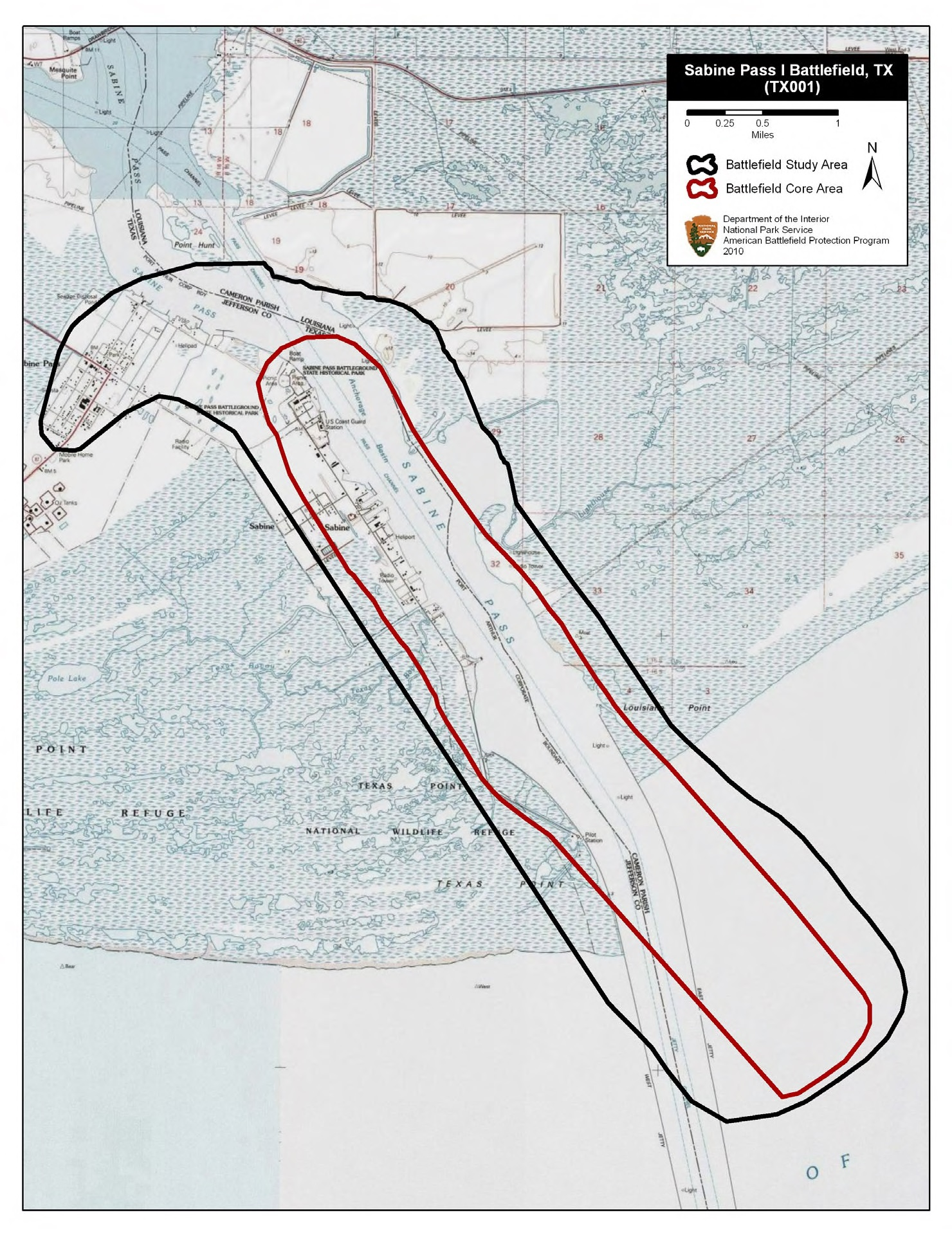
Map of Sabine Pass I Battlefield core and study areas by the American Battlefield Protection Program.

The First Battle of Sabine Pass (September 24–25, 1862), also known as the Bombardment of Fort Sabine, was the first American Civil War bombardment by the United States Navy of a Confederate fort below Sabine City (now Sabine Pass, Texas.) It was the apex in a series of naval and land skirmishes around the mouth of the Sabine River, Texas, and was four weeks before the Union Navy's first armed entry into Galveston Bay following the Battle of Galveston Harbor. Besides strengthening the Union naval blockade of the Texas coastline, the shelling and capture of Sabine Pass was to deter Confederate ground forces from moving southwestward on the Texas coast to augment Galveston's defense. It was intended to open the way for the Union invasion of Texas, which almost a year later, was attempted by a combined force of Union naval and army forces at the Second Battle of Sabine Pass.

== Background ==
Sabine Pass is the waterway serving as the outlet of the Sabine Lake estuary formed by the confluence of the Neches and Sabine rivers. The port at Sabine City was connected by a rail spur to the rail line running from the eastern border of Texas to Houston and Galveston. Although the port and entrance to the pass over the bar was shallow, it served coastal trade and, increasingly, blockade runners.

In September 1862, the commander of the West Gulf Blockading Squadron, Rear Admiral David Farragut, encouraged Master Frederick Crocker in the steamer USS Kensington to capture the port. Farragut assigned Acting Master Quincy Hooper in the schooner USS Rachel Seaman to assist. On September 23, the vessels arrived off of the pass and were joined by Acting Master Lewis Pennington in the mortar schooner USS Henry Janes. The captains conferred and determined that they would not attempt to get the deep draft Kensington over the bar, but instead would use the schooners to make the attack. Late that afternoon the Rachel Seaman made it over, but the slightly deeper draft Henry Janes became stuck when the tide fell.

== Battle ==
The morning of September 24 revealed Pennington's ship stuck in the mud within sight of the fort. Pennington ordered his vessel to fire and it was soon joined by the Rachael Seaman. The Confederate artillerists responded, but their shots fell short as did most of the naval gunfire. After five hours the Henry Janes was freed from the muck and entered the pass. Both schooners maneuvered to within 1.5 miles of the fort and began firing at 5:30 p.m.

Confederate forces numbering twenty eight artillerists manning the artillery batteries, additionally supported by thirty cavalrymen, were unable to effectively return fire as the outdated guns were unable to reach the Union vessels. They took shelter and re-emerged as night fell and the bombardment ceased. After inspecting the damage the Confederate commander, Major Josephus S. Irvine, ordered his artillery spiked and then retreated during the night. Since the fort ceased firing during the day, Crocker attempted to take the fort that evening using launches, but was unable to locate a passage through the large oyster reef which divided the channel.

The next morning, September 25, Crocker fired three rounds into the fort with no response, then went ashore to find the fort deserted. He walked toward Sabine City and was met by a delegation announcing the town's surrender. This was the first major Texas city captured by the Union. Neither side reported suffering any casualties.

== Results ==
On September 27, 1862, three boats with thirty-three men traveled up the Sabine Lake twelve miles, near the mouth of Taylor's Bayou, and attempted to destroy a railroad bridge, but after they left the bridge was saved. During the period between the 27th and the end of the month Crocker and the “Kensington” captured the British Schooner Velocity and Hooper and the “Rachael Seaman” captured the schooner “Dart”. On October 3, 1862, Crocker captured the blockade runner “Dan” on the Calcasieu Pass and used it to travel back up the Sabine Lake to destroy the railroad bridge. Crocker was promoted to the rank of Acting Volunteer Lieutenant "for gallant conduct" in the Sabine Pass and Calcasieu Pass operations by Admiral Farragut. When intelligence reports indicated that there was a large Confederate army, preparing to counter-attack, Master Hooper (then in command of the place) withdrew the Rachael Seaman across the bar and back into the Gulf, abandoning the city and Fort Sabine, thus returning Sabine Pass, the lake, and river to Confederate hands.

== See also ==
- Second Battle of Sabine Pass
