= Josephus S. Irvine =

Confederate major (1819–1876)

Josephus Somerville Irvine
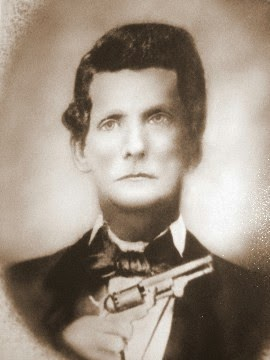
- Born: August 25, 1819; Lawrence County, Tennessee, United States
- Died: May 17, 1876 (aged 56); Newton, Texas, United States
- Burial place: McFarland-Wilson Cemetery, Bleakwood, Texas, United States
- Spouse: Nancy McMahon (m. 1836–1876)
- Children: 7
- Military career
- Allegiance: Republic of Texas; Confederate States
- Branch: Army of the Republic of Texas; Confederate States Army
- Service years: 1835–1836; 1861–1864
- Rank: Major
- Unit: 11th Texas Infantry Regiment
- Conflicts: Texas Revolution: Siege of Béxar; Battle of San Jacinto; American Civil War: Operations to Blockade the Texas Coast; First Battle of Sabine Pass; Taylor's operations in West Louisiana; Battle of Stirling's Plantation

Josephus Somerville Irvine (1819–1876) was a Confederate Major who participated in the Texas Revolution and the American Civil War and was known for commanding Company C of James Liken's Battalion and went on to participate across several battles in the South.

== Early years and Texas Revolution ==
Josephus was born on August 25, 1819, at Lawrence County, Tennessee. The Irvines then moved to Milam, Texas, in 1830 before then moving to a farm that was 4 miles south from San Augustine. In the fall of 1835, at the outbreak of the Texas Revolution, Irvine and his three brothers enlisted in Captain Henry W. Augustine's battalion and would go on to participate at the Siege of Béxar. Irvine then re-enlisted in the Texas Army in March 1836 and served under Benjamin Franklin Bryant. He then served under Sidney Sherman's 2nd Cavalry Regiment during the Battle of San Jacinto and was possibly the youngest soldier during the battle. Around 1836, he married Nancy McMahon, with whom he would have seven children.

Despite being honorably discharged on May 1, Irvine re-enlisted again on July 4, 1836, and served for the next three months under Captain William Scurlock's company at San Agustine. After the war, he served as a tax assessor and collector at Newton County from 1856 to 1860. His property was worth $6,000 (~$164,026 in 2024) according to the 1860 United States census and the 1861 tax roll stated he owned at least one slave.

== American Civil War ==
When the American Civil War broke out, Irvine enlisted in the Confederate States Army and raised a battalion which became Company C of James B. Likens battalion of Texas Volunteers which would later become the 11th Texas Infantry Regiment along with Ashley W. Spaight. Irvine then proceed to participate at the First Battle of Sabine Pass, during which, he ordered the pieces to be spiked as well as removing all stores from the works. He also participated at the Battle of Stirling's Plantation where one of his sons, James Patton Irvine, were killed in the battle. In 1864, Irvine was struck with yellow fever and malaria and resigned from active military service in December 1864.

== Later years ==
Irvine proceeded to work as a farmer and Methodist preacher and was a Freemason as he lived on Milholm Creek until 1870 when he moved somewhere 5 miles south of Newton. He continued to live there until 1876 when he died from cancer as he had it for several years and was buried at Wilson Chapel Cemetery.

== Legacy ==
On April 21, 1963, a monument dedicated to Irvine was unveiled by Cooper K. Ragan at Wilson Chapel Cemetery.
