= Granite Falls =

Granite Falls can refer to:

United States

- Granite Falls, Minnesota
- Granite Falls Township, Chippewa County, Minnesota
- Granite Falls, North Carolina
- Granite Falls, Wyoming

Canada

- Granite Falls, British Columbia

Australia

- Granite Falls (waterfall), New South Wales
- Granite Falls, Tasmania
