= Granite Basin Lake =

Waterbody in Yavapai County, Arizona

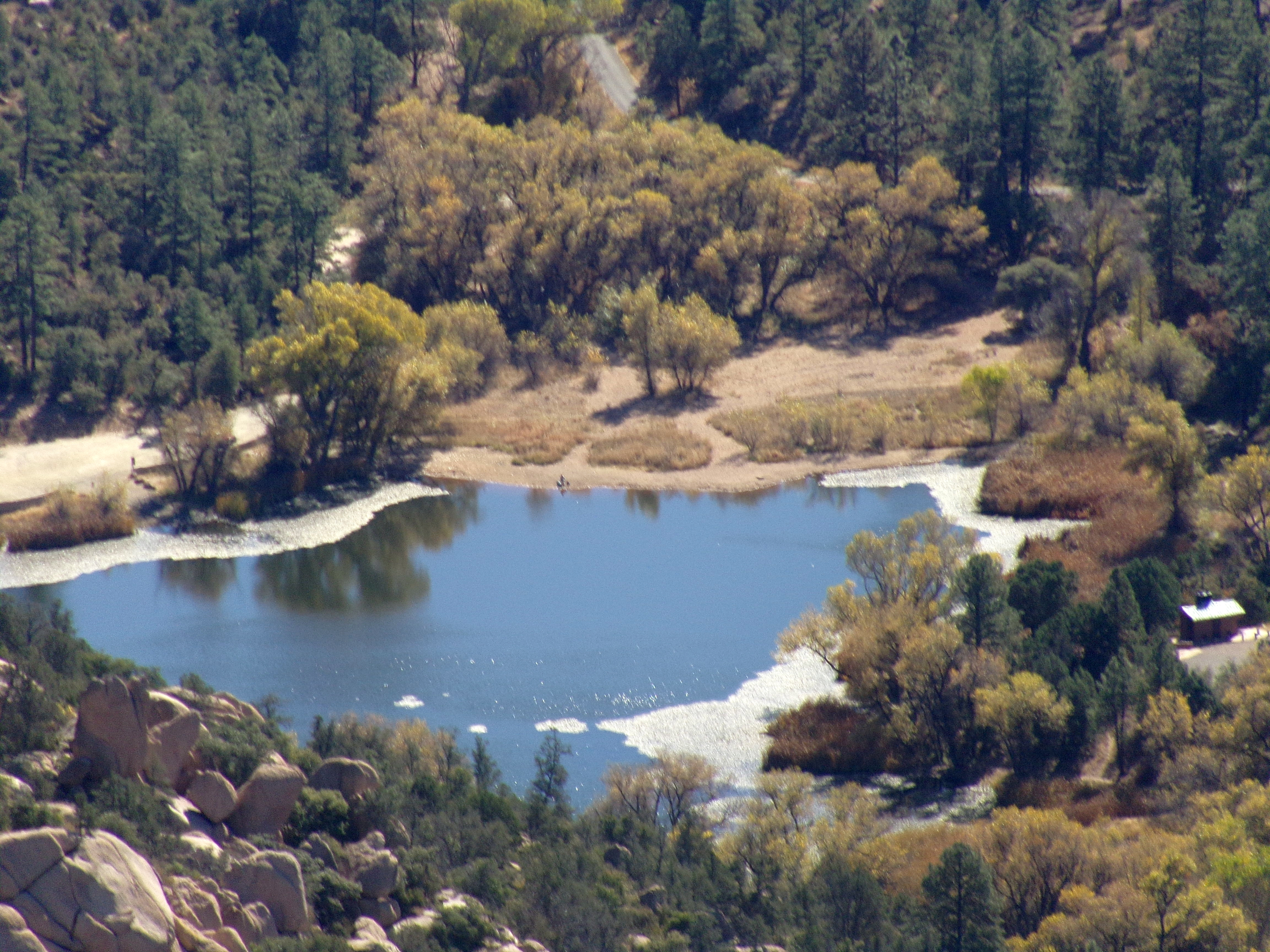

- Location within Arizona
- Location: Prescott National Forest, Yavapai County, Arizona, United States
- Coordinates: 34°37′1″N 112°32′55″W
- Type: Reservoir
- Basin countries: United States
- Managing agency: United States Forest Service
- Surface area: 5 acres (2.0 ha)
- Average depth: 6 ft (1.8 m)
- Surface elevation: 5,600 ft (1,700 m)

Granite Basin Lake is a reservoir located near Prescott, in Yavapai County, North Central Arizona. It is in the Prescott National Forest, adjacent to the Granite Mountain Wilderness Area.

== History ==
Construction began on the dam in 1937 by the Civilian Conservation Corps, and was completed in 1939. A tract of USFS Recreation Residences exists by Granite Basin Lake.

The Raft, a segment of the movie Creepshow 2, was filmed at the lake.

== Fish species ==
- Largemouth Bass
- Sunfish
- Channel Catfish
