= Granite Island =

Granite Island may refer to

- Granite Island (South Australia), close to Victor Harbor, South Australia
- Granite Island (Victoria), in Corner Inlet, to the north of Wilsons Promontory, Victoria, Australia
- Granite Island (Michigan), USA
- Any of several islands in Alaska, USA
- Granite Island, book about Corsica by Dorothy Carrington
