= Granite Lake (Wisconsin) =

- Location within Wisconsin
- Location: Barron County, Wisconsin
- Coordinates: 45°34′47″N 92°00′24″W
- Type: lake

Granite Lake is a lake in Barron County, Wisconsin, in the United States. Granite Lake is a 155 acre lake located in Barron County. It has a maximum depth of 34 feet.

== History ==
Granite Lake was named for the granite rock found in the vicinity.

== See also ==
- List of lakes in Wisconsin
