= USS Granite City =

Gunboat of the United States Navy

Coordinates: 29.060°N 95.009°W

History

United States
- Name: City of Dunedin/Granite City
- Owner: Messrs Patrick Henderson & Co.
- Builder: Denny & Rankin, Dumbarton
- Launched: 13 November 1862
- Acquired: 16 April 1863
- In service: circa 27 August 1863
- Out of service: 6 May 1864
- Captured: by Union Navy forces; 22 March 1863; by Confederate forces; 6 May 1864
- Fate: Ran aground, 20 January 1865

General characteristics
- Displacement: 450 tons
- Length: 160 ft (49 m)
- Beam: 23 ft (7.0 m)
- Depth of hold: 9 ft 2 in (2.79 m)
- Propulsion: steam engine; side wheel-propelled
- Armament: six 24-pounder howitzers; one 12-pounder rifle

USS Granite City was a Confederate blockade runner steamer captured in March 1863 by the Union Navy during the American Civil War. She was armed with cannon and by August 1863 was in service as a gunboat in support of the Navy blockade of Confederate waters. She was recaptured in January 1864 by Confederate forces, again became a blockade runner, and ultimately was abandoned as a wreck after running aground.

== Service history ==
Granite City was originally a Confederate blockade runner, and was captured in the Bahama Islands 22 March 1863 by USS Tioga. She was bought by the United States from the New York City prize court for $55,000 and delivered to the Navy at New York City 16 April 1863, Acting Master Charles W. Lamson in command. Assigned to the Western Gulf Blockading Squadron, Granite City arrived in New Orleans, Louisiana, for duty 27 August 1863. She was detained for a time in quarantine because of sickness on board, but departed 4 September to take part in the ill-fated Sabine Pass Expedition, which was intended to provide a Union lodgment in Texas and prevent possible French moves into that State from Mexico.

Granite City was ideally suited to help support the troop landings because her shallow draft allowed her to cross the bar and lie close to shore. She crossed the bar in company with USS Sachem, USS Clifton, and USS Arizona during the Second Battle of Sabine Pass on 8 September 1863, with her upper deck carrying several hundred Union Army infantrymen. When withering fire of Confederate batteries forced the surrender of Sachem and Clifton, and the Arizona now receiving undivided attention of the fort's artillery, Granite City backed out of the Pass and returned to invasion fleet of 18 other warships waiting offshore. Sachem and Clifton were disabled and captured in the action, though Granite City suffered no battle damage and none of the Union soldiers aboard were lost.

For the next 8 months, Granite City, though often in need of repairs to her weak machinery, actively participated in the blockade of the Texas coast. She captured schooner Anita 27 October 1863, schooner Amelia Ann 16 November, and bark Teresita 17 November. In addition, the steamer supported two landings of troops on the Texas coast. With USS Sciota, she shelled Confederate cavalry off Pass Cavallo 31 December 1863, allowing Union reconnaissance forces to land successfully. Again on 19 January 1864, the two ships covered the landing of several hundred troops near Smith Point, Texas, and defended them by shelling shore positions. After 3 more months of grueling blockade duty, Granite City was dispatched with steamer USS Wave to Calcasieu Pass, Louisiana, to receive refugees. While thus engaged on 28 April 1864, the two ships came under attack by Confederate troops and shore batteries. After an hour's sharp engagement, both ships surrendered, placing Granite City back into Confederate custody.

Fitted out as a Confederate blockade runner, her original occupation, Granite City was loaded at Galveston, Texas, and ran out of Velasco, Texas, 20 January 1865. The night was foggy and she succeeded in eluding the blockading squadron for a time, but the next day she was chased ashore by steamer USS Penguin, and soon broke up on the beach.
