= Second Battle of Sabine Pass =

Battle of the American Civil War

Coordinates: 29°43′13″N 93°52′15″W

- Part of the Trans-Mississippi Theater of the American Civil War
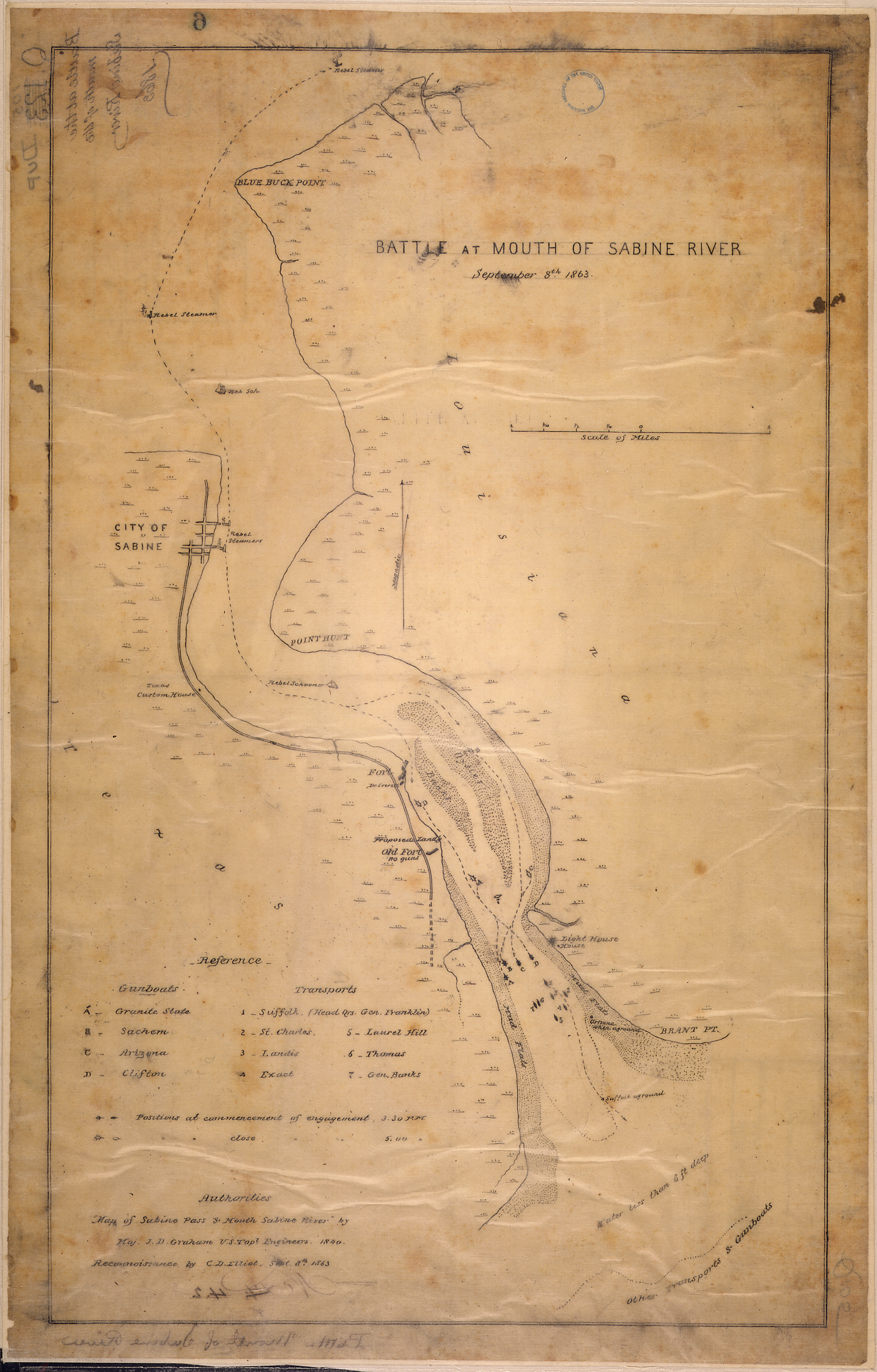
- Drawing of the battle
Date	September 8, 1863
Location	Jefferson County, Texas
Result	Confederate victory

Belligerents
United States	(Confederate States of America) Confederate States

Commanders and leaders
William B. Franklin; Frederick Crocker	Richard W. Dowling; Leon Smith

Units involved
West Gulf Blockading Squadron	Company F ("Jeff Davis Guards"), 1st Heavy Artillery Regiment

Strength
5,000 infantry 4 gunboats 18 transports	46 infantry + 4 reinforcements 6 artillery pieces 1 fort

Casualties and losses
Over 350 killed, wounded, or captured 2 gunboats captured	None

The Second Battle of Sabine Pass (September 8, 1863) was a failed Union Army attempt to invade the Confederate state of Texas during the American Civil War. The Union Navy supported the effort and lost three gunboats during the battle, two captured and one destroyed.

Often credited as the war's most one-sided Confederate victory, the battle led Jefferson Davis to write in 1876 that he 'considered the [second] battle of Sabine Pass the most remarkable in military history.

== Background ==
France was openly sympathetic to the Confederate States of America early in the Civil War, but never matched its sympathy with diplomatic or military action. After Mexican forces were defeated by French forces in summer 1863, Mexican president Benito Juárez escaped the capital, and the French installed Austrian Maximilian as "Emperor". With a de facto French government bordering Texas on the south across the Rio Grande, the Confederates hoped to establish a formal route between Texas and Mexico by way of which the Confederacy could obtain much-needed supplies.

United States President Abraham Lincoln was well aware of Confederate intentions and sent an expedition to establish a military presence in Texas and to discourage Maximilian from opening trade with the Confederacy. The military Federal force was commanded by Major General Nathaniel P. Banks, a political general with little discernible command ability. Banks's original intent was to launch a combined Army–Navy campaign in northwest Louisiana. The Union plan was to send Union Navy warships from the Mississippi up the tributary Red River, which was navigable upstream as far as where the boundaries of the Confederate states of Louisiana, Arkansas, and Texas came together. The Union had effected its Capture of New Orleans on May 1, 1862, and after the July 3, 1863 surrender of Confederate Vicksburg, the Union military had better control of both the east and west banks and of the mouth of the Mississippi. Unusually low water in the Red River at this time, however, prevented even relatively low-draft Union gunboats from operating effectively, and the anticipated overland Union invasion of Texas was further delayed.

Consequently, General Banks ordered his subordinate Major General William B. Franklin to coordinate with the U.S. Navy, to enter the Sabine River from the Gulf of Mexico and defeat the small Confederate detachment at "Fort Sabine" on the river's west bank (Texas side) at Sabine Pass. about 2 miles (3.2 km) upstream of the river mouth. The key U.S. Navy target in the First Battle of Sabine Pass was the original earthworks thrown up on the Texas bank of the Sabine River about three miles (4.8 km) south of Sabine City, a tiny town with some wharfs on the east side of its main street.

The U.S. Army battle plan was that after the U.S. Navy gunboats silenced the guns of Fort Sabine, the wave of about 200 U.S. Army infantrymen, riding the deck of one of the main fleet's reserve gunboats, would debark immediately below (east) of the fort and effect the fort's surrender. The main fleet, less than five miles offshore and well beyond Confederate gunfire, contained as many as 20 vessels, which carried U.S. Army regulars—as many as 5,000 men, according to Official records. A small artillery was included. The company-size initial landing force was to then take Sabine City and secure the area for the main force. After the main force was landed and united with the initial assault company the intention was to march the few miles north to the railroad and cut the railroad between Houston and Beaumont. Once done, the Army force would march east, presumably destroying the rail line as it went, and attack Beaumont. This action would deny Sabine Pass and the natural shallow-water harbor Sabine Lake upstream from the Gulf about 6 miles (9.6 km) to blockade runners.

Considering the dominant size of the Union expeditionary force, taking control of Sabine Pass and environs was not expected to be a great challenge to the U.S. forces. To prevent intervention from Confederate forces in Louisiana that consisted of Brigadier General Thomas Green's First Cavalry Brigade and Brigadier General Alfred Mouton’s infantry division, the Union division of Major General Francis J. Herron moved to Morganza as a diversion, which precipitated the Battle of Stirling's Plantation.

Fort Sabine had been renamed "Fort Griffin" in honor of an earlier commander, Confederate Lt. Colonel W. H. Griffin, although this was not shown on Union maps since the First Battle of Sabine Pass in late September 1862. (Note: This Fort Griffin is not the 1867 post-Civil War U.S. Army cavalry frontier post Fort Griffin west of Fort Worth, Texas.) The Confederate detachment residing at the Sabine Pass fort was the Jeff Davis Guards (named for Confederate president Jefferson Davis), a company of mostly Irish-American men from the Houston and Galveston area, recently had merged into the First Texas Heavy Artillery. They were stationed at the hastily built earthworks a mile (1.6 km) upstream (north) on the southwest bank of the Pass. When the battle began with the Union gunboats' bombardment on September 8, 1863, at the fort were forty-six men; all but two or three were members of the Davis Guards. Under the immediate command of Lieutenant Richard W. Dowling, the Davis Guards had mounted their unit's six old smoothbore cannon on the elevated platform of the small earthen fort. Although unimpressive to Union observers and scouts, the fort's gun positions were high enough to afford a clear view to the horizon for many miles: the flat marshlands stretched northeastward into Louisiana, westward toward Houston, southwestward toward Galveston, northward toward Port Arthur and Beaumont, and southeastward into the Gulf of Mexico. The nearest observation point affording a view of Fort Griffin, other than from the mast "top" of a naval vessel seaward of the Pass, was the Sabine Pass lighthouse on the Louisiana (opposite) side of Sabine Pass at the mouth of the Sabine River.

== Battle ==
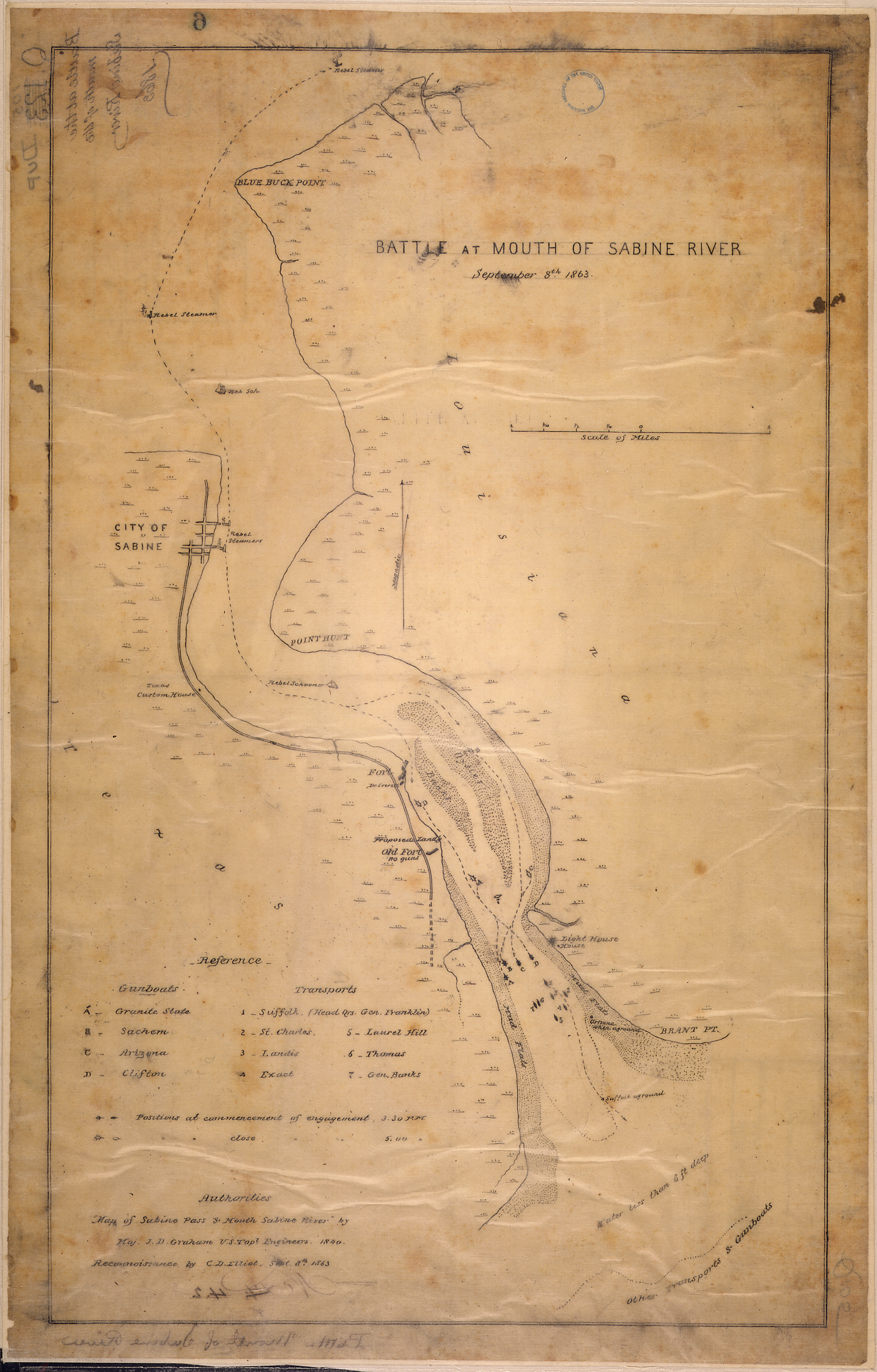
Battle of Mouth of Sabine River, September 8th, 1863

On the afternoon of September 8, 1863, U.S. Navy Lieutenant Frederick Crocker ("Acting Captain") was in command of the advance squadron composed of four gunboats. Crocker was a veteran officer of considerable recent experience in Union river-gunboat actions and blockade duty. His ship was the USS Clifton, a steam-powered side-wheeler. Besides Clifton, Crocker's advance squadron included Granite City, Sachem, and Arizona, all former merchant ships. Less than three miles southeast downriver, well out of range of the Confederate fort's cannons, were anchored seven U.S. Navy transports carrying most of the U.S. Army soldiers of the landing force. The U.S.S. Suffolk, hosting invasion force commander U.S. Army Major General Franklin and his staff, headed the seven-vessel squadron. Outside the principal Gulf shore sand bar, an additional two miles (3.2 km) downstream of this squadron, lay at anchor the remaining ships of the 22-vessel invasion fleet. The cited contemporary U.S. Army map shows the nominal positions of the bombardment fleet of four, the seven ships of the transport squadron, and the relative position farther out in the Gulf of the remaining vessels. The official reports of the battle generally reflect the map's information. The total number of Union infantry assault troops in the landing force is given as 5,000 infantrymen, which included 500 listed as aboard the Granite City, those aboard the six troop transports in the seven-ship squadron headed by Suffolk, plus an artillery company somewhere among them. The first wave of 500 men aboard Granite City which steamed as close behind Clifton as possible but out of range of the fort's guns, were to land in the open space adjacent to and downstream of the fort. This was a flat, often muddy area already cleared of brush by the Confederate garrison as a clear field of fire for the canister and grape of the fort's artillery. The U.S. Army's invasion plan, therefore, absolutely required that the Confederate guns be silenced before any troops were debarked. This engagement was to be the largest amphibious assault on enemy territory in the history of the U.S. military up to that date.

Leon Smith, who was at Beaumont, Texas, immediately ordered all Confederate troops in Beaumont, some eighty men, aboard the steamer Roebuck and sent them down the river to reinforce Fort Griffin. Smith and a Captain Good rode to the fort on horseback, reaching the fort some three hours before the steamer, arriving just as the Union gunboats USS Clifton and Sachem came within range, and assisted in the defense of the fort.

Dowling's well practiced Irish-Texan artillerymen, whose chosen and officially approved unit name was "Jefferson Davis Guards", had placed range-stakes in the two narrow and shallow (5-to-7 feet or 1.5-to-2.1 m) river channels. These were the "Texas channel" near the southwest shore and the "Louisiana channel" against the Louisiana shore. The white-painted stakes were for determining accurate range of the fort's guns: six old smooth-bore cannon. Each "Davis Guards" gun crew during gunnery practice thereby worked to predetermine the approximate charge (amount of gunpowder) needed for each type projectile available for their specific gun (ball, canister, or grapeshot); and which specific guns, charges, and loads had the best potential to hit each range-stake.

Crocker's squadron had no local river pilots, but only general knowledge of the river's channels, and no assurance of locations of the constantly varying depths especially of large oyster-shell "reefs" or "banks" between the river's two channels. Regarding this battle no mention is found in official U.S. Navy reports of whether Union sailors were making observations and taking depth soundings from the gunboats' now dangerous top decks, while the Confederate cannon shots pounded and shook their ships. The few maps to which they had access were old and outdated or could not account for recent changes in river-bottom conditions. On Captain Crocker's signal the Sachem, followed by Arizona, advanced up the right channel (Louisiana side) as fast as they dared, firing their port-side guns at the fort. Clifton approached in the lead, ascending the Texas channel at full speed. Granite City hovered out of range behind Clifton, having orders not to risk debarking the 500 assault troops until the fort surrendered or its guns were silenced. As Sachem entered among the range-stakes, the Confederates opened fire. Then Clifton came into range, followed by Arizona. Despite their old smoothbore cannon, one of which had just become inoperable, after only a few rounds it was obvious the Confederate artillerymen's months of training and target practice was an astounding success as their aim was deadly accurate.

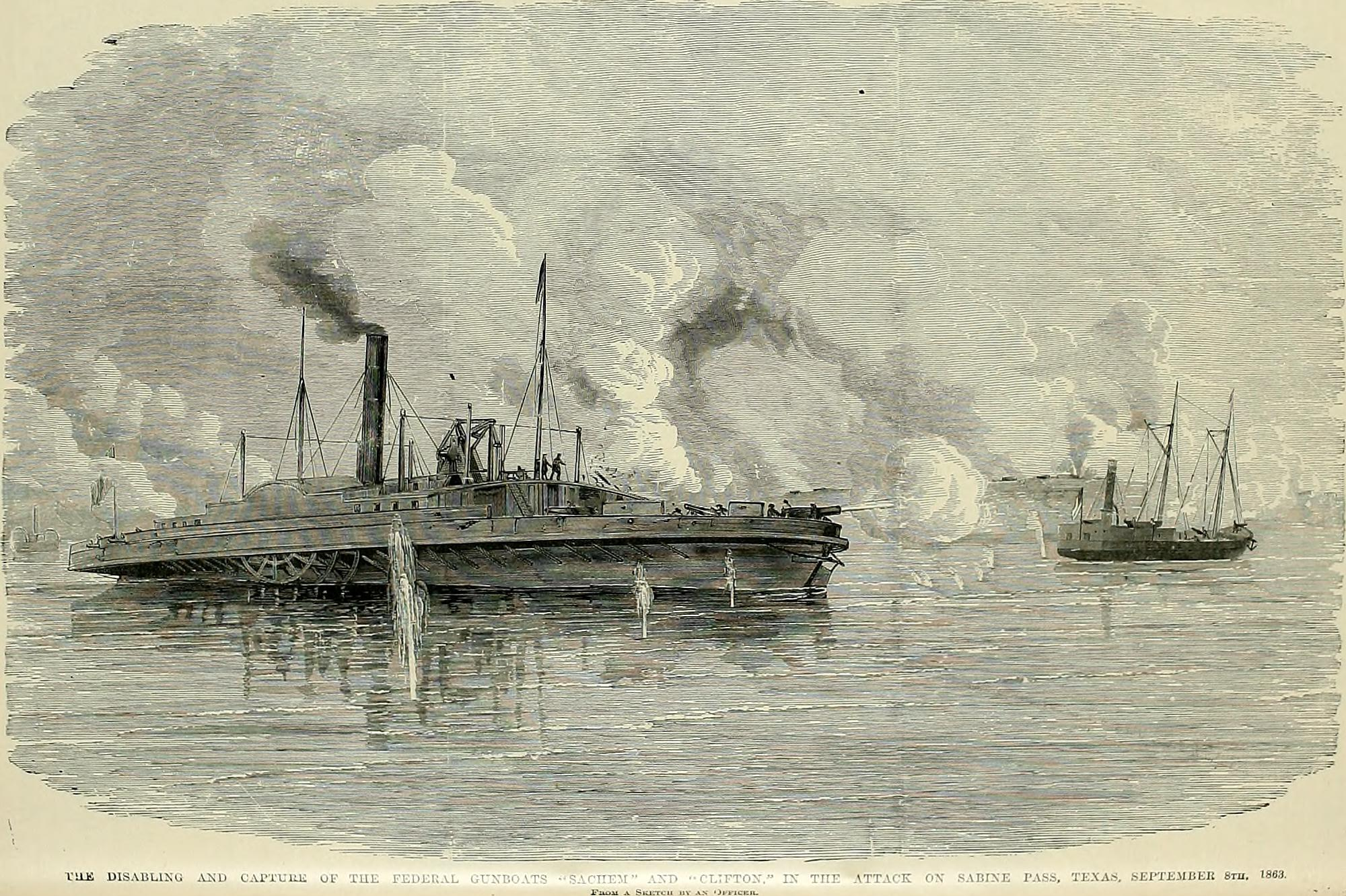
The Confederates capture Clifton and Sachem

The Confederates captured Clifton and Sachem with a total of 13 heavy cannon, including at least two new potent Parrott rifles, which were handed over to Leon Smith's Texas Marine Department. The Union casualties amounted to two dozen killed and badly wounded, about 37 missing, and 315 Navy men captured. The combined Union Army and Navy invasion force withdrew and returned to New Orleans. The Confederates had no casualties.

== Aftermath ==
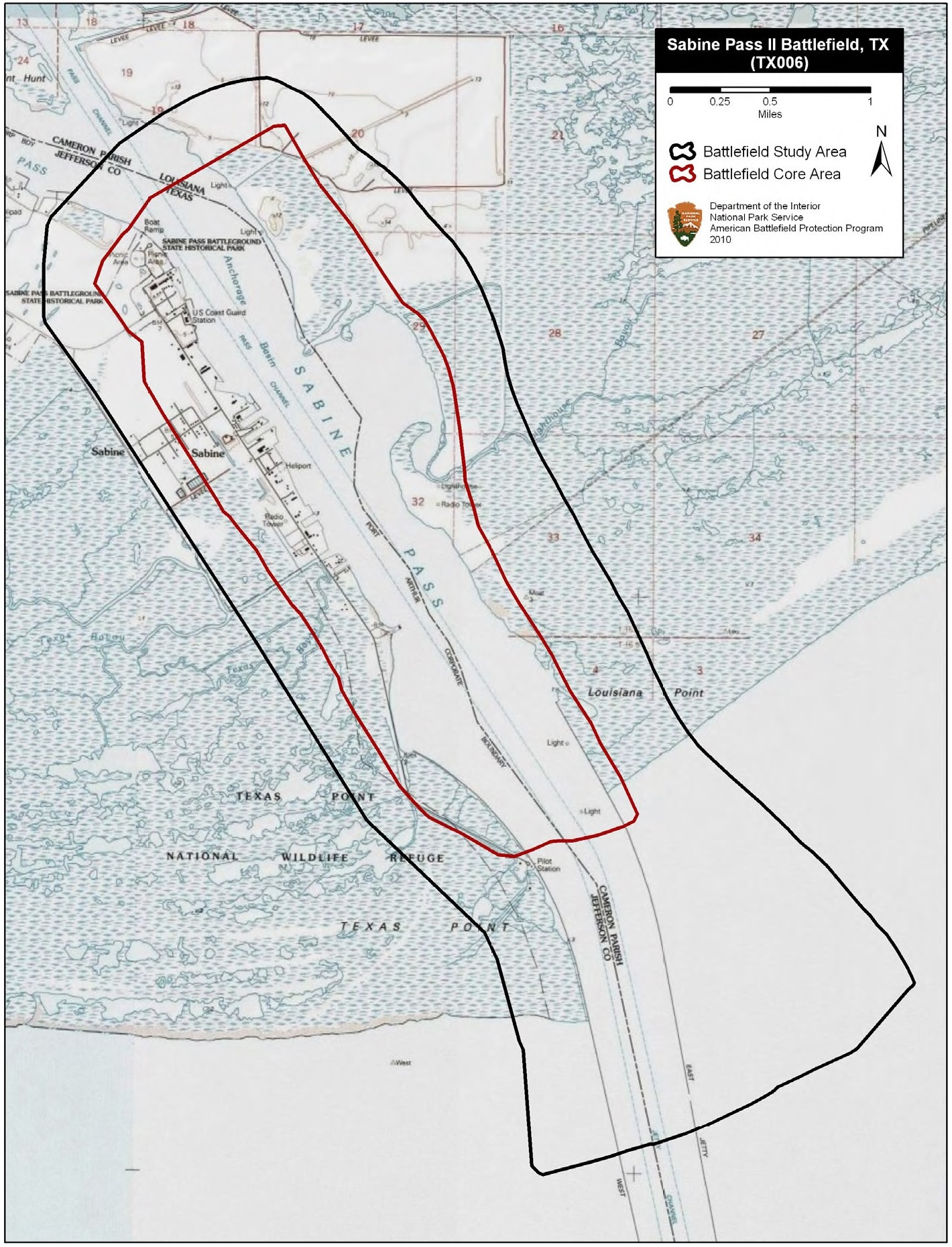
Map of Sabine Pass II Battlefield core and study areas by the American Battlefield Protection Program.

In recognition of the victory, the Confederate Congress passed a resolution of special thanks to the officers and men of the Davis Guard. In addition, Houston residents raised funds to provide medals to the Guard; the Davis Guards Medals were made from silver Mexican pesos by smoothing off the coins, then hand-stamping and hand-engraving on one side, the battle name and date and on the other side the initials "D G" and a cross pattée. The medals were hung on green ribbons, and presented to the members of the Davis Guard. The official Confederate silver medals were presented in a public ceremony a year later.

The Battle of Sabine Pass was of moderate tactical or strategic significance to the Civil War. It was successful in ensuring that the anticipated overland Union invasion of Texas was delayed indefinitely. A Confederate supply line from Mexico to Texas had existed out of the Port of Bagdad, since the outbreak of the war but was held by the increasingly isolated Mexican Republicans. By the time Imperial French and Mexican forces captured Bagdad in 1864, a supply line to anywhere in the Confederacy east of the Mississippi was no longer feasible on account of the Union victory at Vicksburg in July 1863. The Confederacy was therefore forced to continue its reliance on blockade running to import valuable materials and resources.

== See also ==
- List of conflicts involving the Texas Military
- Texas Military Department
- Texas Military Forces
- Awards and decorations of the Texas Military
