= Sabine Pass =

Watercourse in United States of America

Coordinates: 29°43′35″N 93°51′48″W

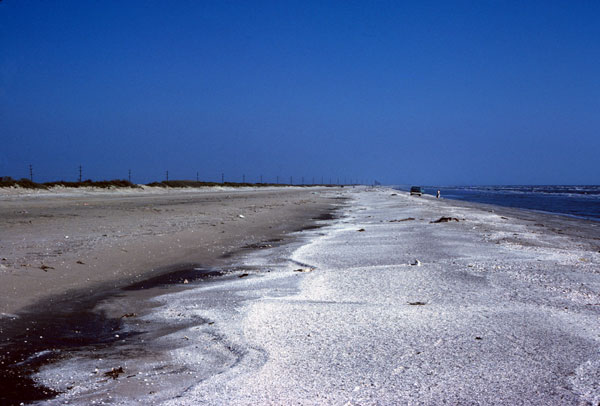
Wide natural beach near Sabine Pass

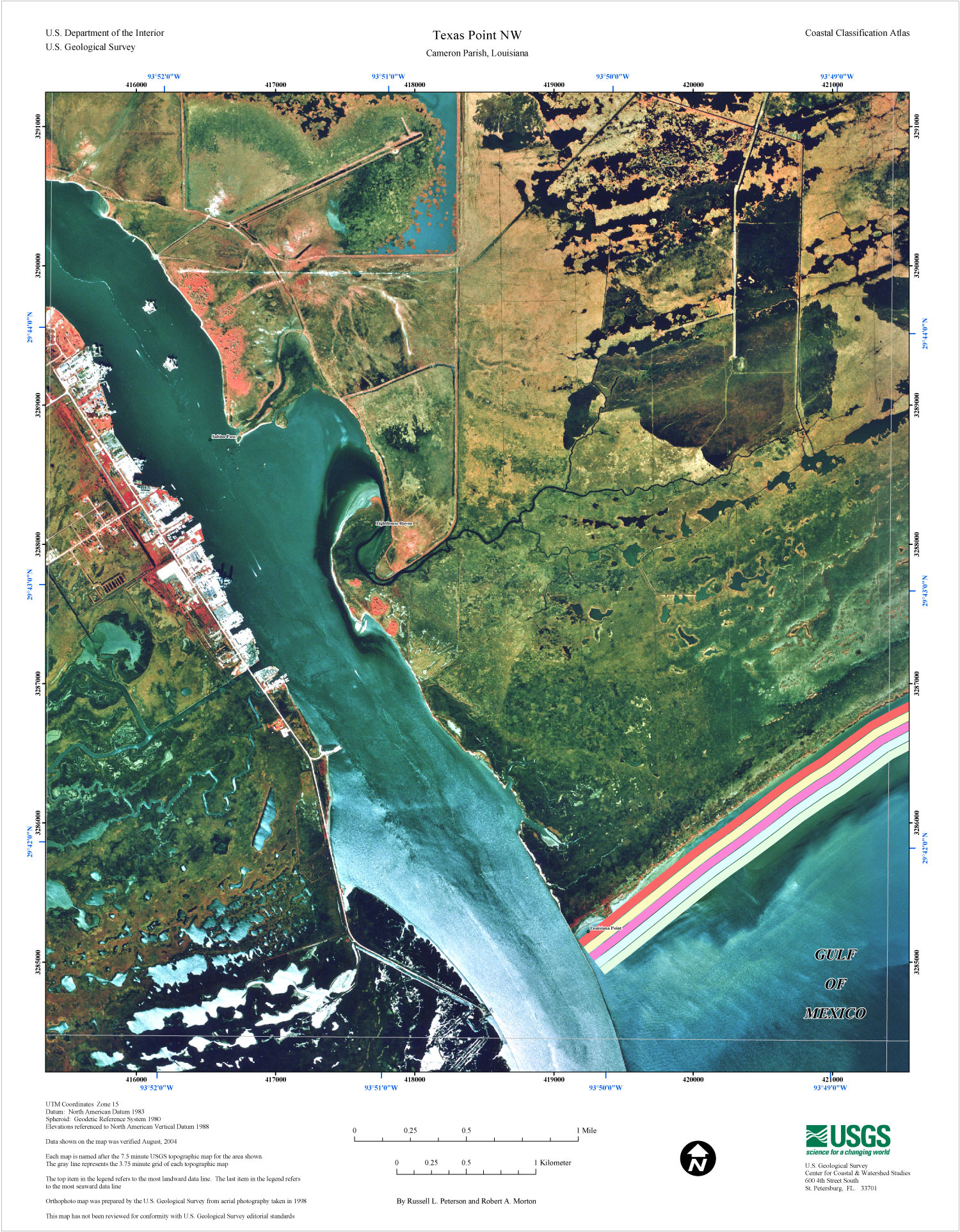
USGS map of Sabine Pass

Sabine Pass is the natural outlet of Sabine Lake into the Gulf of Mexico. It borders Jefferson County, Texas, and Cameron Parish, Louisiana.

== History ==
=== Civil War ===
Two major battles occurred here during the American Civil War, known as the First and Second Battles of Sabine Pass.

=== Spanish–American War ===
In May 1898, the 55th United States Congress authorized the establishment of two seacoast defense forts at Sabine Pass relative to the Texas Gulf Coast. The fortifications were a response as hostilities intensified in the Gulf of Mexico during the Cuban War of Independence often referred as the Spanish–American War. In 1983, Texas Historical Commission acknowledged the seacoast defense command posts establishing a Texas historical marker at the Sabine Pass Battleground State Historic Site.

=== World War II ===
In 1941, the United States authorized a coastal artillery emplacement and Harbor Entrance Control Post at the Sabine Pass natural waterway inlet as a response to Battle of the Atlantic better known as Operation Drumbeat orchestrated by Nazi Germany. The Sabine Pass military base exhibited checkpoint and guard end stations, coastal searchlights, coastal signal stations, and an observation tower. The coastal defense and fortification incorporated an artillery battery command post complementary as a Coast Guard lifeboat station initially chartered in the 1870s as the United States Life-Saving Service.

The Sabine Pass coastal defense installation was deemed military surplus as the United States Department of War operations tapered by 1945.

The channel is also the only conceivable way that ships produced by shipyards in Orange and Beaumont could have reached the seas.

=== Hurricanes ===
A powerful storm made landfall at Sabine Pass on October 12, 1886. It was the 10th hurricane of the season, now referred to as the Texas-Louisiana Hurricane of 1886, that all but wiped out Sabine Pass and Johnson Bayou in Cameron Parish. The storm, now considered to have been a category 3 (Saffir–Simpson scale), resulted in at least 196 deaths. Occurrence of the storm was recorded in the controversial "Diary of Louise" on October 20, 1886.

Hurricane Rita made landfall on September 24, 2005, and on September 12–13, 2008, Hurricane Ike struck Sabine Pass and Galveston, generating the highest surge of 22 feet (6.7 meters) which is, according to the North American Vertical Datum of 1988, the highest ever recorded at Sabine Pass.

== Current ==
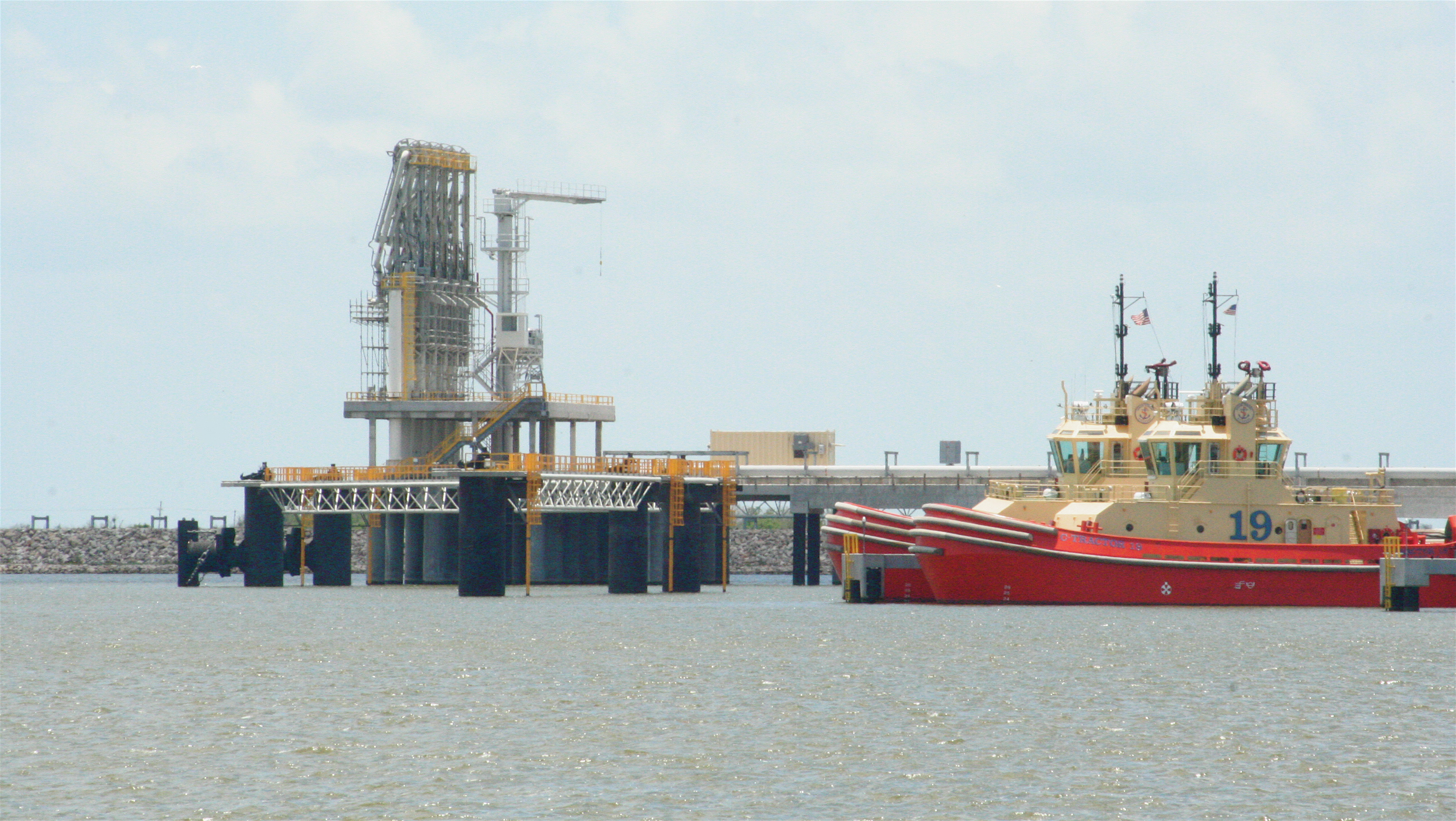
Golden Pass LNG Sabine Pass

Sabine Pass is a site for an LNG terminal because it is located along one of a few deepwater ports along the Gulf Coast suitable for LNG. The region also has an existing pipeline infrastructure with access to Southeast Texas and U.S. markets. The terminal can import or export up to 30 million tons of LNG per year.

The former city of Sabine Pass, Texas, is now a neighborhood of Port Arthur.

== See also ==
- Sabine River (Texas–Louisiana)
