= Battle of Corpus Christi =

Battle fought during the American Civil War

- Part of the Trans-Mississippi Theater of the American Civil War
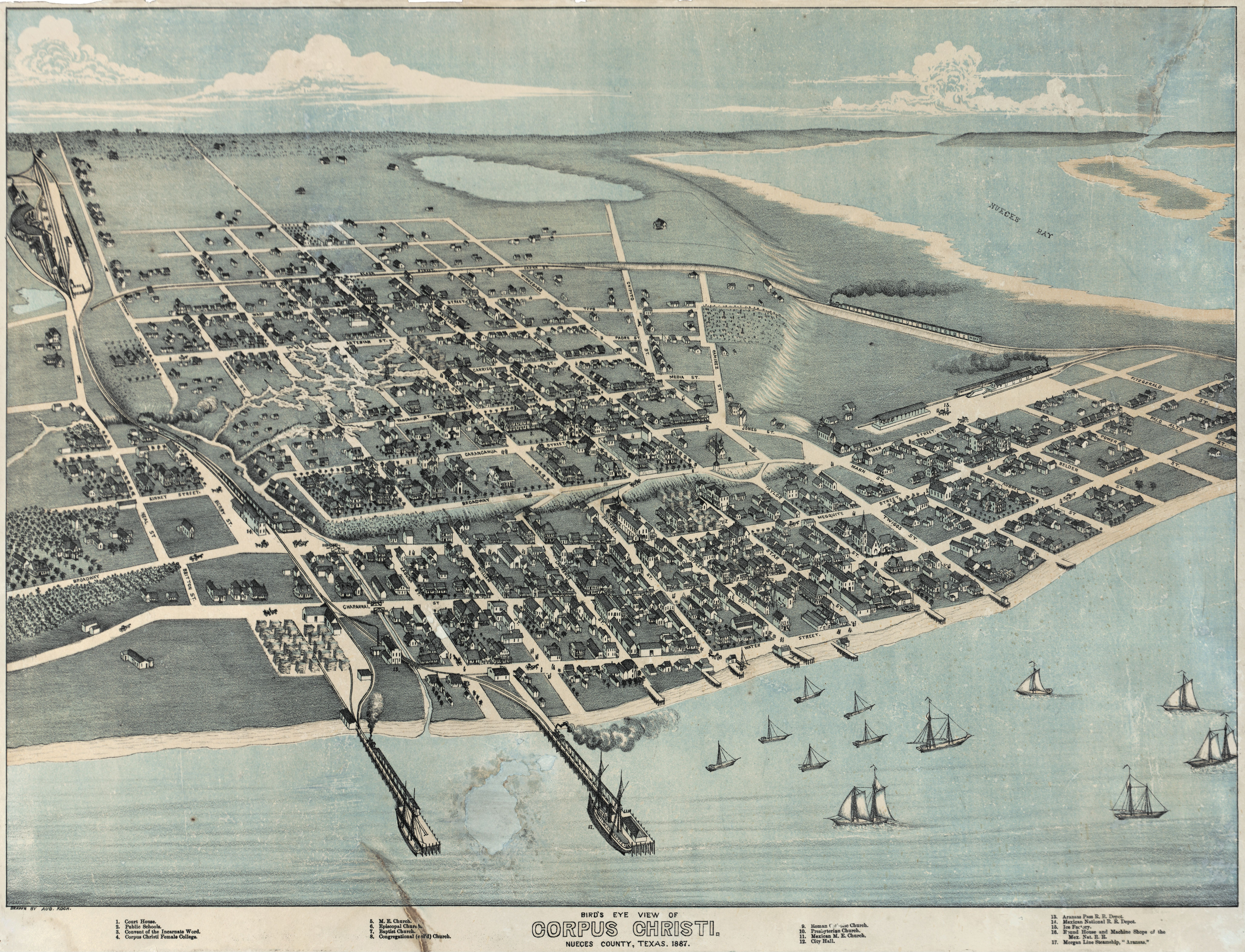
- Corpus Christi in 1887
Date	August 12–18, 1862
Location	Corpus Christi, Texas 27.7938°N 97.3964°W
Result	See § Aftermath

Belligerents
United States	Confederate States

Commanders and leaders
John W. Kittredge; Frederick Crocker	Alfred Marmaduke Hobby; Charles G. Løvenskiold; John Ireland

Strength
Land: 100 sailors 1 artillery piece Sea: 1 bark 1 sloop-of-war 1 schooner 1 steamer 1 yacht	Land: 700 militia 5 artillery pieces 1 fort Sea: 1 sloop-of-war 2 schooners 1 steamer

Casualties and losses
~2 wounded 1 sloop-of-war damaged 1 steamer damaged 1 yacht damaged	1 killed 1 wounded 1 schooner captured 1 schooner scuttled 1 sloop-of-war scuttled 1 steamer scuttled 1 fort damaged
- Location within Texas

The Battle of Corpus Christi was fought between August 12 and August 18, 1862, during the American Civil War. United States Navy forces blockading Texas fought a small land and sea engagement with Confederate forces in and around Corpus Christi Bay and bombarded Corpus Christi. Union forces defeated Confederate States Navy ships operating in the area but were repulsed when they landed on the coast.

== Background ==
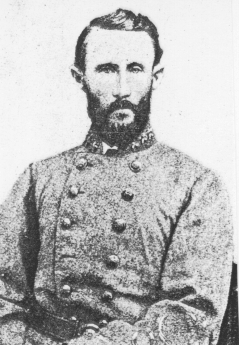
The Confederacy's Alfred Marmaduke Hobby

Texas had been a main source of supplies for Confederate forces during the American Civil War. Union naval operations to blockade the Texas coast began. Despite being in a Confederate state, Corpus Christi was home to supporters of both the Confederacy and United States.

Five Union and four Confederate ships were involved in the battle. United States Navy vessels included the sloop USS Belle Italia, the steamer converted to a gunboat USS Sachem, the bark USS Arthur, the schooner USS Reindeer and an armed yacht named USS Corypheus.

Confederate naval forces included at least two armed vessels, a sloop named CSS Breaker, a schooner named CSS Elma, another sloop named CSS Hannah and a merchant steamer, the A.B. or A. Bee.

USS Sachem was originally commanded by Captain H. W. Morris, the former U.S. Navy commander of New Orleans, and was armed with one 20-pounder Parrott rifle and four 32-pounder (15 kg) cannons. The size of her crew was about fifty; she had also participated in several other historic naval engagements such as Hampton Roads and the Battle of Forts Jackson and St. Philip. Captain Morris is not believed to have fought in this battle. Lieutenant Amos Johnson commanded Sachem. Lieutenant John W. Kittredge was in charge of Arthur, which held over eighty men and was armed with six 32-pounder smooth-bore guns. Kittredge commanded the flotilla and Arthur was the flagship of the force. Corypheus mounted one 30 lb (14 kg) rifled gun and one 24-pounder (11 kg) howitzer. She had a crew of twenty-eight men and was commanded by Acting Master A. T. Spear. Bella Italia's armament and crew are not known. Reindeer mustered six 24-pounder howitzers. Little is known of the Confederate ships.

The size of Corpus Christi's garrison included a few militia companies with two M1841 6-pounder field guns. They were later reinforced by militia, some mounted, another two 12-pounders (5.4 kg) and one 18-pounder (8.2 kg) gun. A total of 700 Confederates were involved in the battle. The militia garrison was commanded by Colonel Charles G. Lovenskiold, but he handed his command over to Major Alfred M. Hobby when he arrived with reinforcements. The garrison was based at the citadel in Fort Kinney.

== Battle ==
=== Corpus Christi Raid ===
At noon on August 12, just northwest of Corpus Christi, Union ships Belle Italia, Sachem, Reindeer and Corypheus were sailing from Aransas Bay through a canal into Corpus Christi Bay when they sighted CSS Breaker. The Union Navy vessels then gave chase to the sloop which was filled with sailors and several Confederate States Army soldiers who were returning from a reconnaissance mission. After a long pursuit the Union ships closed in on the Confederates and opened fire. The Confederate commander chose to ground his sloop and then scuttle it by fire to prevent her capture. A boarding party from Arthur went to take the vessel and prevent the burning. By the time they arrived, the Confederates had already lowered life boats and were escaping overland. The Union sailors boarded the Breaker and put out the fire. Having taken and refloated the prize ship and thus weakened the defenses of Corpus Christi, Union commanders felt it was now time to attack the Confederates defending the town. Knowing that Breaker was gone, Confederates in the bay scuttled CSS Elma and the sloop CSS Hannah.

=== Blockade ===
After taking the Breaker, the Union vessels sailed southwest the short distance to Corpus Christi and established a blockade. Sachem and Corypheus were designated the first to bombard the Confederate fort. Lieutenant Kittredge transferred his flag to Corypheus from Arthur which he sent north to procure supplies such as ammunition and food. Belle Italia and Reindeer sat out of range as reserves and the captured Breaker was used as a hospital ship.

The following morning on August 13, Lieutenant Kittredge and a boarding party were ordered ashore to demand a Confederate surrender of the port town on the Nueces river. He was also ordered to allow a forty-eight-hour truce for the evacuation of women and children should the rebels decide to make a stand. The rebels refused to surrender. The Union continued the blockade for the next forty-eight hours. On the 16th when the truce ended, Kittredge for unknown reasons, delayed his attack, so the Confederates used the time to continue strengthening their fort.

=== Attack on Fort Kinney ===
When the rebels evacuated the town of civilians and finished working on the fort, they attacked the Union vessels at dawn on August 17. Lieutenant Kittredge responded with counter battery fire and silenced the guns temporarily. Whenever the Union ships ceased firing, the Confederates would man the battery again and continue fighting. This process of repeatedly silencing the fort lasted all day and night until Kittredge withdrew his ships due to the darkness. Sachem and Corypheus were both damaged slightly, Bella Italia is known to have been hit as well, the shot wounded a petty officer on deck.

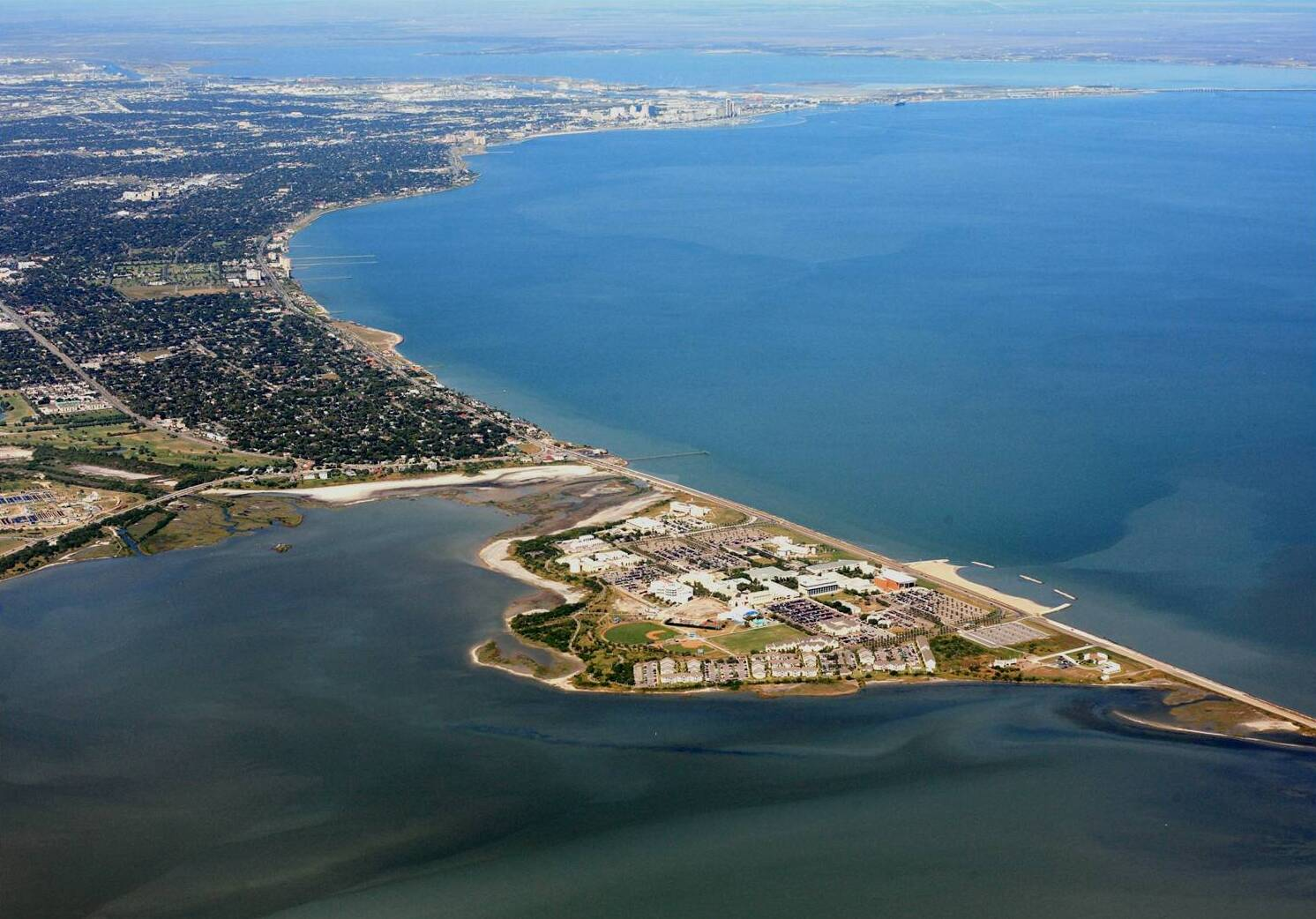
Corpus Christi (left), Nueces Bay (top), Corpus Christi Bay (right), Oso Bay (bottom)

Near midnight on the 17th, Belle Italia sent a shore party of thirty sailors and a 12-pounder howitzer to attack the fort; seventy other sailors were available for landing but only Bella Italia's thirty men were sent ashore. That same night rebel forces scuttled A.B. in the shallow channel that leads to Nueces Bay. Kittredge in Corypheus repeatedly tried to tow the ship out of the channel before it burned completely, this was undertaken either to take the ship as a prize or to prevent the ship from sinking and blocking the narrow channel. The Union ships stayed as far away as possible which helped prevent casualties on both sides. The distance of the ships from the fort meant both forces had to fire at maximum range, thus decreasing the effectiveness of their shots. The Confederate gunners were also untrained; a shortage of gunpowder left them without the ability to practice before the engagement.

The next morning the landing force advanced until within cannon and musket range of the fort; fighting again commenced and soon the ships resumed bombarding the rebel guns. At this time Major Hobby and twenty-five infantrymen advanced in order to defend the battery. Cavalry under Lieutenant James A. Ware were held in reserve but eventually joined-in the attack. Skirmishing continued for a time; the Union sailors held out due to their ships which supported them with artillery fire. After a prolonged skirmish, the Union forces on land began to run low on ammunition and reboarded USS Bella Italia with help from the blockade. Fort Kinney was not taken but it was silenced by Union fire at this time. The Confederates defeated the shore party and withdrew to the town. Crewmen of United States Navy ships saw this movement so Kittredge ordered the bombardment of the coastal buildings to where the rebels had withdrawn. Most of the damaged buildings were houses and stores. After all the ammunition aboard the warships had been expended, the battle was over and Kittredge ordered his ships north into Aransas Bay. During the bombardment a Unionist living in Corpus Christi named John Dix, grabbed his American flag and headed for the roof of his Water Street home. Dix intended to wave the flag at the United States ships as a sign of surrender, but before he could get to his roof his daughter-in-law stopped him. She was married to Dix's son who was fighting for the Confederacy, the daughter carried a shotgun and pointed it at her father-in-law until the flag was put away. When the shelling was over, the Confederates in town were very angry and many of the Unionists were happy. Anger over the attack led to the looting of several houses belonging to Union supporters.

== Aftermath ==
Casualties of the engagement are mostly unknown, two Union sailors were wounded, one aboard Bella Italia. At least one Confederate was killed in action, Major Hobby was slightly wounded. Once in Aransas Bay, the ships reunited with Arthur which had left the blockade earlier. The battle ended as a tactical victory for the United States; they overcame Confederate naval activity in the area and silenced the enemy fort protecting Corpus Christi and the bay. Confederate forces did defeat the Union shore party, they also continued to hold the town and the silenced fort after the battle. During the second battle going into flour bluff Kittredge was captured and kept in prison by Capt. John. Ireland and was later released after the war. The initial cannon fire into the city inflicted some civilian casualties as well including an old man who was suffering from rheumatism, he was in his bedroom when a cannon ball tore through his house and flung him down his staircase killing him. Another casualty was young private Henry Mote who was killed via grapeshot to the head.

== Order of battle ==
United States Navy

- USS Arthur, bark, (flagship)
- USS Belle Italia, sloop
- USS Sachem, steamer
- USS Corypheus, yacht, (transferred flagship)
- USS Reindeer, schooner

Confederate States Navy

- CSS Hannah, sloop
- CSS Breaker, schooner
- CSS Elma, schooner
- A.B., steamer, (merchant ship)
