= USS Breaker (1862) =

Gunboat of the United States Navy

History

United States
- Laid down: date unknown
- Launched: date unknown
- In service: circa August 1862
- Out of service: date unknown
- Stricken: date unknown
- Fate: not known

General characteristics
- Displacement: not known
- Length: not known
- Beam: not known
- Draught: not known
- Propulsion: sail
- Speed: varied
- Complement: 3
- Armament: not known

USS Breaker was a schooner captured by the Union Navy during the American Civil War. She was used by the Union Navy as a gunboat in support of the Union Navy blockade of Confederate waterways.

== Operating as a Confederate Government schooner in Texas waterways ==
Early in the Civil War the Confederate Government acquired the small schooner Breaker and used her as a pilot boat at Pass Cavallo and as a general utility vessel in the inland waters along the Texas coast. The vessel was active at least as early as July 11, 1862, for on that day she carried a Confederate officer who was observing the operations of Union warships in Corpus Christi Bay.

== Kittredge in Arthur captures the schooner Breaker ==
A month later, Act. Vol. Lt. John W. Kittredge, who commanded the bark Arthur as well as the other Union forces afloat in the area, left his ship and entered Aransas Bay in the tender Corypheus accompanied by the gunboat Sachem and the schooner Reindeer. There they encountered Breaker, returning from a reconnaissance mission with a detachment of Confederate soldiers embarked. The Union ships gave chase and forced Breaker ashore. Her crew set her afire before abandoning ship, but a Federal boarding party quickly put out the flames.

== Attempting to secure the release of Judge Edmund Jackson Davis’ Family ==
Kittredge refloated the schooner and added her to his flotilla as another tender to Arthur. In mid-September, Breaker accompanied Corypheus on an expedition to Corpus Christi, Texas, to secure the release of the family of Judge Edmund J. Davis, a prominent political leader who had remained loyal to the Union after his state seceded and had escaped into exile to serve the Union cause.

Kittredge went ashore under a flag of truce at Corpus Christi where the Confederate commanding officer refused to permit Mrs. Davis to leave Texas, but promised to refer the matter to higher authority. While waiting a decision from San Antonio, Texas, Kittredge took his two ships to Flour Bluff, where Belle Italia joined them. The next morning, they fired upon several small vessels which escaped into the Laguna Madre, the shallow waters of which forbade the Union ships to follow.

Kittredge landed a small party and took three prisoners before returning to Corypheus. The following morning, Kittredge again went ashore where he and his party of seven men were captured by a large group of Southern soldiers. Fear of harming Kittredge and his men prevented Breaker and her consorts from firing on the enemy ashore.

== Final operations of the war ==
Breaker was later used to store and issue provisions and ammunition to the small ships of the Union flotilla that operated along the Texas coast between Cavallo and Corpus Christi Passes. The last reference to her in the records is dated November 9, 1862. Her service may have ended shortly afterward.
