= List of shipwrecks in August 1862 =

The list of shipwrecks in August 1862 includes ships sunk, foundered, grounded, or otherwise lost during August 1862.

== 1 August ==
List of shipwrecks: 1 August 1862
Ship	State	Description
Delfsharen	Belgium	The ship was wrecked 14 nautical miles (26 km) off Booby Island, Queensland. Her crew survived. She was on a voyage from Newcastle, New South Wales to Java, Spanish East Indies.
James Yeo	United Kingdom	The ship was wrecked on Cape Breton Island, Nova Scotia, British North America. Her crew were rescued. She was on a voyage from Livorno, Italy to Quebec City, Province of Canada, British North America.
Lizzie	United Kingdom	American Civil War, Union blockade: Carrying a cargo of arrowroot, caustic acid, blankets, sheet tin, and soda ash, the 41-ton sloop was captured and destroyed by the gunboat USS Penobscot (United States Navy) off New Inlet, North Carolina, Confederate States of America.
Margaret	United Kingdom	The ship was driven ashore near L'Etang-du-Nord, Province of Canada, British North America. She was on a voyage from Montreal, Province of Canada to Gloucester. She was refloated.
Rose	United Kingdom	The ship ran aground on Ornsay, Outer Hebrides. She was on a voyage from the Strangford Lough to Newcastle upon Tyne, Northumberland. She was refloated the next day and resumed her voyage on 5 August.

== 2 August ==
List of shipwrecks: 2 August 1862
Ship	State	Description
America	United Kingdom	The full-rigged ship was abandoned in the Atlantic Ocean off the Cape of Good Hope, Cape Colony. Her crew were rescued by Matilda Atheling and William Chambers (both United Kingdom). America was on a voyage from Bombay, India to Liverpool, Lancashire.
Commodore Perry	United States	The 193-ton sternwheel paddle steamer exploded on the Ohio River at the wharves at Louisville, Kentucky, killing three people.
Nimrod	(France) Saint Lucia	The sloop was wrecked in a squall. She was on a voyage from Castries to Vieux Fort.
Only Son	United Kingdom	The schooner was driven ashore at Great Yarmouth, Norfolk. She was on a voyage from Texel, North Holland, Netherlands to Bristol, Gloucestershire. She was refloated the next day.

== 3 August ==
List of shipwrecks: 3 August 1862
Ship	State	Description
HMS Adventure	Royal Navy	The storeship was driven ashore on the coast of New Brunswick, British North America. Subsequently refloated, repaired and returned to service.
Antelope	United Kingdom	The steamship was driven ashore in a typhoon at Hong Kong.
Bengal	United States	The full-rigged ship was severely damaged in a typhoon at Hong Kong.
Bombay Castle	United Kingdom	The ship was scuttled in a typhoon at Hong Kong.
Cannata	United Kingdom	The brig was driven ashore in a typhoon at Hong Kong.
Charlotte A. Morrison	United Kingdom	The ship was destroyed by fire at Port Elizabeth, Cape Colony. She was on a voyage from Akyab, Burma to Falmouth, Cornwall.
Chilo	United Kingdom	The full-rigged ship was driven ashore and wrecked in a typhoon at Macao, China.
Eagle	United Kingdom	The ship ran aground on the East Hoyle Bank, in Liverpool Bay. She was on a voyage from Rio de Janeiro, Brazil to Liverpool, Lancashire. She was refloated and put out to sea.
Iskundershah	United Kingdom	The ship was driven ashore in a typhoon at Hong Kong. She was later refloated.
Jacob Bell	United States	The full-rigged ship was driven ashore in a typhoon at Hong Kong.
Medicana	United Kingdom	The brig capsized in a typhoon at Hong Kong.
Sycee	United Kingdom	The steamship was driven ashore in a typhoon at Hong Kong.
Thomas	United Kingdom	The brig ran aground on the Bredegrund. She was refloated the next day but was driven ashore on Saltholm, Denmark. She was refloated.
Washington	United States	The full-rigged ship ran aground in a typhoon at Hong Kong and was severely damaged.
Unidentified sloop	Confederate States of America	American Civil War, Union blockade: The sloop was burned at Smithfield Creek in Virginia by the armed sidewheel paddle steamer USS Delaware (United States Navy).

== 4 August ==
List of shipwrecks: 4 August 1862
Ship	State	Description
Alfred	United Kingdom	The ship struck the pier at Seaham, County Durham and was damaged. She was on a voyage from Seaham to Colchester, Essex. She consequently put in to Sunderland, County Durham in a leaky condition.
Charlemagne	France	The lugger was driven ashore at Seaton Carew, County Durham. She was refloated and taken in to Blyth, Northumberland, United Kingdom.
Cornelia	United Kingdom	The ship was driven ashore at Waterloo, Lancashire. She was on a voyage from Rouen, Seine-Inférieure to Liverpool, Lancashire.
Maid of the Yare	United Kingdom	The ship ran aground on the Newcombe Sand, in the North Sea off the coast of Suffolk. She was on a voyage from Middlesbrough, Yorkshire to a French port. She was refloated and resumed her voyage.

== 5 August ==
List of shipwrecks: 5 August 1862
Ship	State	Description
Annie B. Bourne	United States	The schooner struck a snag in the Sacramento River at Sutterville, California, and sank.
CSS Arkansas	Confederate States Navy	Illustration of the Arkansas burning while under fire from USS Essex, Harper's Weekly, 5 September 1862. American Civil War, Battle of Baton Rouge: The ironclad warship became disabled and ran aground while maneuvering to engage the ironclad river gunboat USS Essex (United States Navy) in the Mississippi River at Baton Rouge, Louisiana. Her crew set her on fire and abandoned ship, and she slipped off the river bank, drifted downstream, exploded, and sank at 30°29′14″N 91°12′5″W.
British Queen	United Kingdom	The barque ran aground on the Longsand, in the North Sea off the coast of Essex. She was on a voyage from Sunderland, County Durham to Villaricos, Spain. She was refloated with assistance from Queen and Volunteer, both United Kingdom, and taken in to Harwich, Essex.
Ceres	United Kingdom	The barque ran aground at Bideford, Devon. She was on a voyage from Quebec City, Province of Canada, British North America to Bideford.
Eliza Rae	United Kingdom	The schooner foundered off the south coast of Spain. Her crew were rescued by the schooner Bella Vicenta (Spain). Eliza Rae was on a voyage from Casablanca, Morocco to Falmouth, Cornwall.
Gallant	United Kingdom	The brig foundered in the North Sea off Marsden, County Durham. Her eight crew were rescued.
Victoria	United Kingdom	The sloop collided with the fishing boat Rose Mary (United Kingdom) and foundered in the North Sea off Sandsend, Yorkshire. She was on a voyage from Middlesbrough, Yorkshire to Spalding, Lincolnshire.

== 6 August ==
List of shipwrecks: 6 August 1862
Ship	State	Description
Oak	United Kingdom	The sailing barge foundered in the Solent. Her four crew were rescued.

== 7 August ==
List of shipwrecks: 7 August 1862
Ship	State	Description
Gerye Dalmeyey	Russia	The ship was driven ashore on Saaremaa. Her crew were rescued. She was on a voyage from an English port to Riga.
Moulin	United Kingdom	The ship collided with the steamship Daphne (United Kingdom) and foundered in the English Channel off Start Point, Devon with the loss of sixteen of her seventeen crew. She was on a voyage from Bahia, Brazil to Rotterdam, South Holland, Netherlands.
Whiteman, or Lewis Whitman	United States	Carrying dead and wounded from the Battle of Baton Rouge – including the body of Brigadier General Thomas Williams – and a cargo of sutler′s stores, the transport steamer sank in the Mississippi River near Donaldsonville, Louisiana, Confederate States of America with the loss of all hands after colliding with the sloop-of-war USS Oneida (United States Navy).

== 8 August ==
List of shipwrecks: 8 August 1862
Ship	State	Description
Express	Grand Duchy of Oldenburg	The schooner ran aground on Meyers Ledge. She was on a voyage from Newcastle upon Tyne, Northumberland, United Kingdom to Bremerhaven. She was refloated with the assistance of the steamship Simson (Bremen) and towed in to Bremerhaven.

== 9 August ==
List of shipwrecks: 9 August 1862
Ship	State	Description
Antonie	Danzig	The schooner ran aground at Hartlepool, County Durham, United Kingdom. She was on a voyage from Danzig to Hartlepool. She was refloated with the assistance of a tug and towed in to Hartlepool.
Caringa	United States	The ship ran aground in the Hooghly River. She was on a voyage from Melbourne, Australia to Calcutta. She was refloated with the assistance of a steamship.
Crystal Palace	United Kingdom	The barque was wrecked in Table Bay.
Eaglet	United Kingdom	The brig struck the Hendon Rock, off the coast of County Durham. She was taken in to Sunderland, County Durham in a sinking condition.
Kate	United Kingdom	The barque was wrecked in Table Bay.
Marietta	United Kingdom	The brigantine was wrecked in Table Bay.

== 11 August ==
List of shipwrecks: 11 August 1862
Ship	State	Description
Eidsvold	Norway	The full-rigged ship heeled over at North Shields, Northumberland, United Kingdom. She was later righted.
CSS Elmea	Confederate States Navy	American Civil War, Union blockade: The armed sloop or schooner ran aground on the coast of Texas in Nueces Bay off Corpus Christi Bay. Confederate forces burned her on 12 August to prevent her capture by the barque USS Arthur (United States Navy).
Pelican	United Kingdom	The barque was driven ashore at Cape Horn, Chile. She floated off and foundered. Her fourteen crew survived, but two of them died before they were rescued on 25 August by the barque Schamyl (United States). Pelican was on a voyage from Liverpool, Lancashire to Callao, Peru.
Unidentified sloop	Confederate States of America	American Civil War, Union blockade: Carrying a cargo of salt, the sloop was driven ashore in the Potomac River.

== 12 August ==
List of shipwrecks: 12 August 1862
Ship	State	Description
Breaker	Confederate States of America	American Civil War, Union blockade: Pursued by the barque USS Arthur and schooner USS Corypheus (both United States Navy), the pilot boat, a schooner, was run ashore and set on fire by her crew in Nueces Bay on the coast of Texas in the vicinity of Pass Cavallo. Union forces salvaged and repaired her and placed her in use as a tender.
Ganges	United Kingdom	The ship capsized and sank in the River Thames at Shadwell, Middlesex with the loss of five of her crew. There were about 40 survivors.
Hannah	Confederate States of America	American Civil War, Union blockade: Aground off Corpus Christi, Texas, at the entrance to Nueces Bay, the sloop or armed schooner was burned by Confederate forces to prevent her capture by either the barque USS Arthur or boats from the armed schooner USS Corypheus (both United States Navy).
Kameo	(United Kingdom of Great Britain and Ireland) British North America	The ship ran aground off Entry Island, Nova Scotia. Her crew survived. She was on a voyage from Liverpool, Lancashire to Miramichi, New Brunswick.
Laurel Hill	United States	Drifting down the Mississippi River after slipping her moorings at Baton Rouge, Louisiana, Confederate States of America with rigging for the gunboat USS Kineo (United States Navy) aboard, the wharf boat sprang leaks and sank.
Mia Maitre	Italy	The barque foundered in the Pacific Ocean off the coast of Peru. Her crew took to two boats. Five crew in one boat subsequently died before the survivors were rescued by and American whaler. Six crew in the other boat were reported missing.

== 13 August ==
List of shipwrecks: 13 August 1862
Ship	State	Description
Queen of Sheba	United Kingdom	The barque ran aground on the Bucco Reef, off Tobago. She was on a voyage from Scarborough Bay to Little Comland Bay. She was refloated the next day and completed her voyage.
West Point	United States	The 409-ton sidewheel paddle steamer sank with the loss of 76 of the 279 people on board after colliding with George Peabody (United States) on the Potomac River off Ragged Point Beach, Virginia, Confederate States of America.
William and Jane	United Kingdom	The ship sprang a leak and foundered off Mortehoe, Devon. Her crew survived. She was on a voyage from Cardiff, Glamorgan to Plymouth, Devon.

== 14 August ==
List of shipwrecks: 14 August 1862
Ship	State	Description
Advance	Norway	The ship was abandoned in the Atlantic Ocean. Her crew were rescued by Homeward Bound (United Kingdom). Advance was on a voyage from Cardiff, Glamorgan, United Kingdom to New York, United States.
Sylphiden	Sweden	The ship was driven ashore on the west coast of Gotland. She was on a voyage from Gävle to Hull, Yorkshire, United Kingdom. She was later refloated and towed in to Whitby, Yorkshire in a severely damaged condition.

== 15 August ==
List of shipwrecks: 15 August 1862
Ship	State	Description
Columbus	United Kingdom	The ship was wrecked near "Rutnaghorry", India with the loss of more than 100 of the 270 people on board. She was on a voyage from Bombay, India to Singapore, Straits Settlements.
Mia Madre	Italy	The barque was abandoned in the Pacific Ocean 1,000 nautical miles (1,900 km) off Callao, Peru. Her crew took to three boats. One boat was reported missing. The second boat capsized with some loss of life; survivors were rescued by the third boat. Five people on board that boat died before the survivors were rescued on 3 September by an American whaler. Mia Madre was on a voyage from Callao to Valencia, Spain.
USS Sumter	United States Navy	American Civil War: The steam ram ran aground in the Mississippi River off Bayou Sara in Louisiana. She was stripped by both Confederate and Union forces, then burned by the Confederates.

== 16 August ==
List of shipwrecks: 16 August 1862
Ship	State	Description
John and Elizabeth	United Kingdom	The brig was driven ashore at Long Beach, New York, United States. She was on a voyage from Cádiz, Spain to New York City, United States.
Tropic Bird	United Kingdom	The ship foundered off the Sand Heads, India with the loss of twelve of her 23 crew. Survivors took to boats; eight of them were rescued by Sirius (United Kingdom), three were reported missing. Tropic Bird was on a voyage from Calcutta, India to Colombo, Ceylon.

== 17 August ==
List of shipwrecks: 17 August 1862
Ship	State	Description
Emily Caroline	United Kingdom	The barque ran aground on the Loo Bank, off Trinidad. She was on a voyage from Sunderland, County Durham to Trinidad and Pará, Brazil.
Great Eastern	United Kingdom	The steamship struck a rock off Long Island, New York, United States and was holed. She was on a voyage from Liverpool, Lancashire to New York City. She completed her voyage and was placed under repair. Repairs took until January 1863 to complete.
Stag	United Kingdom	The ship ran aground on the Whiting Sand, in the North Sea off the coast of Norfolk. She was on a voyage from Brussels, Flanders, Belgium to King's Lynn, Norfolk. She was refloated and taken in to King's Lynn in a severely leaky condition.
Thetis	United Kingdom	The ship was damaged by fire at Exeter, Devon.

== 18 August ==
List of shipwrecks: 18 August 1862
Ship	State	Description
Callie	United States	American Civil War: The 129-ton steamer was burned by Confederate forces on the Duck River in Tennessee, Confederate States of America while tied up to the riverbank to exchange cargoes.
Elizabeth and Jane	(United Kingdom of Great Britain and Ireland)	The schooner was abandoned in the Atlantic Ocean (35°51′N 68°09′W). Her two surviving crew were rescued by Kelton (United Kingdom). Elizabeth and Jane was on a voyage from Minatitlán, Mexico to New York, United States.
Mealman	Norway	The brig ran aground on the Owers Sandbank, in the North Sea and was abandoned by her crew, who were rescued by a smack. She was later refloated and towed in to Great Yarmouth, Norfolk, United Kingdom by the buoy tender Beacon ( Trinity House) and a tug.
Reporter	United States	The medium clipper sprang a leak and foundered off Cape Horn, Chile with the loss of 32 of her 36 crew. Survivors were rescued by the barque Enchantress (United Kingdom). Reporter was on a voyage from New York to San Francisco, California.
Skylark	United States	American Civil War: The 371-ton sidewheel paddle steamer was burned by Confederate forces on the Duck River in Tennessee while tied up to the riverbank to exchange cargoes.

== 19 August ==
List of shipwrecks: 19 August 1862
Ship	State	Description
RMS Cleopatra	United Kingdom	The steamship ran aground and was wrecked at the mouth of the Shebar River, Africa with the loss of a crew member. She was on a voyage from Bonny, Africa to Liverpool, Lancashire.
Donegal	United Kingdom	The brigantine ran aground in the English Channel 4 nautical miles (7.4 km) east of Weymouth, Dorset. She was on a voyage from Newcastle upon Tyne, Northumberland to Exeter, Devon. She was refloated the next day with assistance from the Coast Guard and towed in to Weymouth in a severely leaky condition.
Maria	United Kingdom	The schooner was driven ashore near "Brede", Devon. She was on a voyage from Padstow, Cornwall to Newport, Monmouthshire.
Pelican	United Kingdom	The ship was wrecked near Cape Horn, Chile. Her fifteen crew too to a boat. Two of them had died before the survivors were rescued on 18 September. She was on a voyage from Liverpool to Callao, Peru.
Swallow	United States	American Civil War: Ten to 12 days after she ran aground on the Mississippi River at Glover, Mississippi, Confederate States of America, the 190-ton sternwheel paddle steamer was burned by Confederate forces.

== 20 August ==
List of shipwrecks: 20 August 1862
Ship	State	Description
Brazilian	United Kingdom	The ship ran aground off Falster, Denmark. She was on a voyage from St. Davids, Pembrokeshire to Riga, Russia. She was refloated and put in to Swinemünde, Prussia in a severely leaky condition.
Johanna Stolt	Hamburg	The ship was abandoned in the Atlantic Ocean. Her crew were rescued by the barque Precursor (United Kingdom). Johanna Stolt was on a voyage from Amsterdam, North Holland, Netherlands to Valparaíso, Chile.
Kronprindsesse Josephine	Norway	The ship was wrecked on the Owers Sandbank, in the North Sea. Her crew were rescued. She was on a voyage from Brevig to Penzance, Cornwall, United Kingdom.

== 21 August ==
List of shipwrecks: 21 August 1862
Ship	State	Description
Acacia, or Acacia Cottage	United States	The 100- or 109-ton sternwheel paddle steamer struck a snag and sank in the Mississippi River about 25 miles (40 km) above Helena, Arkansas, Confederate States of America, with the loss of at least 75, and as many as 140 lives. Survivors were rescued by Conway and W. H. B. (both United States). Acacia was on a voyage from Memphis, Tennessee to Helena.
Ariel	United Kingdom	The steamship ran aground on the Cacava Rocks, off Cape Scala, Greece. She was on a voyage from Corfu, United States of the Ionian Islands to Patras, Greece.
Susan Jane	United Kingdom	The smack was run down and sunk by the steamship Ibis (United Kingdom) off St. German's Head, Pembrokeshire. Her crew were rescued by Ibis. Susan Jane was on a voyage from Llanelly, Glamorgan to Kilmore Quay, County Wexford.

== 22 August ==
List of shipwrecks: 22 August 1862
Ship	State	Description
Kelloha	United States	The 396-ton sidewheel paddle steamer was stranded in Lake Huron.
Knight Templar	United Kingdom	The ship ran aground on the Pluckington Bank, in the Irish Sea off the coast of Lancashire. She was on a voyage from Arica, Peru to Liverpool, Lancashire. She was refloated and taken in to Liverpool in a leaky condition.
Titania	United Kingdom	The ship struck the Momode Rocks. She was on a voyage from London to Mogador, Morocco. She consequently put in to Falmouth, Cornwall in a leaky condition.

== 23 August ==
List of shipwrecks: 23 August 1862
Ship	State	Description
USS Adirondack	United States Navy	The screw sloop-of-war was wrecked without loss of life on a reef off the northeast point of Man-O-War Cay in the Little Bahamas, about one nautical mile (1.8 km) northeast of Little Bahama Bank. Her crew were rescued. The wreck was burned by Bahamanian wreckers.
Helen Scott	United Kingdom	The brig was wrecked on the Welsh coast with the loss of all hands.

== 24 August ==
List of shipwrecks: 24 August 1862
Ship	State	Description
USS Henry Andrew	United States Navy	During a storm in the North Atlantic Ocean, the armed screw steamer was driven ashore 15 miles (24 km) south of Cape Henry, Virginia, Confederate States of America and was wrecked without loss of life. She was not salvaged.
USS Isaac N. Seymour	United States Navy	American Civil War, Union blockade: The paddle steamer ran aground and sank in the Neuse River in North Carolina, Confederate States of America. She was refloated, repaired, and returned to service.
Tubal Cain	United Kingdom	The ship collided with Constance (United Kingdom) and foundered in the Pacific Ocean 200 nautical miles (370 km) off Cape Otway, Victoria with the loss of fourteen of her fifteen crew.

== 25 August ==
List of shipwrecks: 25 August 1862
Ship	State	Description
Britannia	United Kingdom	The brig foundered east of the Saltee Islands, County Wexford. Her crew were rescued. She was on a voyage from Swansea, Glamorgan to New Ross, County Wexford.
Jessie	United Kingdom	The brig sprang a leak and was beached at Grimsby, Lincolnshire. She was on a voyage from Seaham, County Durham to London.
Sia en Elizabeth	Netherlands	The schooner ran aground on the Tarf Tail, off Swona, Orkney Islands, United Kingdom and sank. Her crew survived. She was on a voyage from Stralsund to Larne, County Antrim, United Kingdom.
Vittoria	Austrian Empire	The barque-rigged steamship was wrecked at Akyab, Burma. She was on a voyage from Akyab to Falmouth, Cornwall, United Kingdom.

== 26 August ==
List of shipwrecks: 26 August 1862
Ship	State	Description
Elizabeth	United Kingdom	The brig was driven ashore at Lowestoft, Suffolk. She was refloated. She was on a voyage from Hartlepool, County Durham to London. She was refloated and taken in to Lowestoft in a leaky condition.
Euphemia	United Kingdom	The ship was driven ashore in the Bay of Luce. She was on a voyage from Maryport, Cumberland to Quebec City, Province of Canada, British North America. She was refloated the next day with the assistance of a tug.
Flying Mist	United States	The medium clipper arrived in Bluff, New Zealand from Glasgow, Renfrewshire, United Kingdom carrying twenty passengers and several hundred sheep on 25 August. She was poorly anchored, and during the night after her arrival she struck a rock and was holed. The crew of the steamship Aldinga ( (United Kingdom of Great Britain and Ireland) New Zealand) helped rescue passengers, crew, and luggage, along with much of the livestock, but over 100 sheep drowned as the ship sank.
Yorktown	Confederate States of America	American Civil War, Union blockade: The steamer sprang a leak and foundered in the Gulf of Mexico off Ship Island, Mississippi, after leaving Mobile, Alabama, in an attempt to run the Union blockade and carry a cargo of cotton to Havana, Cuba. Her 26 survivors in two lifeboats were rescued 72 nautical miles (133 km) southeast of Ship Island by the schooner Annie Clapp (flag unknown).

== 27 August ==
List of shipwrecks: 27 August 1862
Ship	State	Description
Emily	Hamburg	The ship collided with another vessel and sank south of Őland, Sweden. She was on a voyage from Hamburg to Riga, Russia.
Mathilde	Prussia	The brig ran aground at Sunderland, County Durham, United Kingdom. She was on a voyage from Wisbech, Cambridgeshire, United Kingdom to Sunderland. She was refloated and taken in to Sunderland for repairs.
Osprey	United Kingdom	The steamship ran aground on the Droogden, in the Baltic Sea. She was on a voyage from Stettin to West Hartlepool County Durham. She was refloated with the assistance of a Royal Danish Navy warship and resumed her voyage.
Patriot	United Kingdom	American Civil War, Union blockade: The schooner – holed, stripped, her masts cut down, and her cargo missing – was found aground near Mosquito Inlet, Florida, Confederate States of America, by the screw steamer USS South Carolina (United States Navy). South Carolina destroyed her.

== 28 August ==
List of shipwrecks: 28 August 1862
Ship	State	Description
Cecelia	Hamburg	The ketch was wrecked on the Kentish Knock. Her crew survived. She was on a voyage from Hamburg to Weymouth, Dorset, United Kingdom.
Jeanne D'Acre	France	The schooner sank at the mouth of the Risle. She was on a voyage from Newcastle upon Tyne, Northumberland, United Kingdom to Pont-Audemer, Eure. She was refloated on 9 September but sank again. She had been refloated by 21 October and taken in to Honfleur, Manche.
La France	France	The barque was wrecked off Gopalpur, India.
Sarah Dwyer	United Kingdom	The ship ran aground at the mouth of the São Francisco River.
Senator	United States	The passenger ship was abandoned in the Atlantic Ocean. All on board were rescued by Neptune (Flag unknown). Senator was on a voyage from New York to Liverpool, Lancashire, United Kingdom.

== 29 August ==
List of shipwrecks: 29 August 1862
Ship	State	Description
C. H. Southard	United States	The full-rigged ship ran aground near Blyth, Northumberland, United Kingdom. She was refloated and taken in to North Shields, Northumberland.
Jane Miller	United Kingdom	The schooner ran aground on the Kratzsand. She was on a voyage from Banff, Aberdeenshire to Hamburg. She was refloated the next day and taken in to Cuxhaven.
W. S. Schmidt	United States	The ship ran aground on the Goodwin Sands, Kent, United Kingdom. She was on a voyage from Antwerp, Belgium to New York. She was refloated and resumed her voyage.

== 30 August ==
List of shipwrecks: 30 August 1862
Ship	State	Description
Christina	Sweden	The ship ran aground at Sunderland, County Durham, United Kingdom. She was on a voyage from Piteå to Sunderland. She was refloated and taken in to Sunderland.
Emma	United Kingdom	American Civil War, Union blockade: The 460-bulk ton sidewheel paddle steamer was burned by her crew after running aground on the southeast side of Jones Island, Georgia on the 20th.
Mimmie Dike	(United Kingdom of Great Britain and Ireland) Tasmania	The schooner was wrecked in the Duck River. She was subsequently sold, and had been refloated by 21 October.
Mississippi	United States	The steamship was abandoned in the Atlantic Ocean. All 58 people on board were rescued, 51 by Prins Oscar (Netherlands) and seven by Minstrel (United Kingdom). Mississippi was on a voyage from Montevideo, Uruguay to Hong Kong.

== 31 August ==
List of shipwrecks: 31 August 1862
Ship	State	Description
Safeguard	United Kingdom	The brig was run into by HMS Psyche (Royal Navy) in the River Thames and was severely damaged. She was on a voyage from Danzig to London.
Venango	United States	American Civil War: The 120-ton sternwheel paddle steamer sank at the Scuffletown Bar in Louisiana, Confederate States of America. She later was refloated.
W. B. Terry	United States	American Civil War: Captured by Confederate States Army troops, the 175-ton sternwheel paddle steamer, carrying a cargo of coal, ran aground at Duck River Shoals on the Tennessee River in Tennessee. Confederate States of America. The Confederates stripped and burned her.
Unidentified sloop	United States	American Civil War: The sloop was burned on the Rappahannock River at Fredericksburg, Virginia, Confederate States of America, by the armed tug USS Anacostia (United States Navy).

== Unknown date ==
List of shipwrecks: Unknown date in August 1862
Ship	State	Description
A. B., or A Bee	Confederate States of America	American Civil War, Union blockade: Aground at the entrance to the Nueces River in Corpus Christi Bay at Corpus Christi, Texas, the steamer was burned to the waterline by Confederate forces on either 15 or 17 August to prevent her capture by the bark USS Arthur (United States Navy).
Acacia	United States Army	American Civil War: The troop transport was sunk.
Arabella	United Kingdom	The brig was wrecked on Grand Cayman, Cayman Islands.
B. F. Bruce	United States	The 168-ton screw steamer burned at Port Stanley, Province of Canada, British North America.
C. A. Morrison	United States	The ship was destroyed by fire in Algoa Bay.
Champion	United Kingdom	The brig was wrecked in Goa Bay. She was on a voyage from Bombay to Kurrachee, India.
Colooney	United Kingdom	The ship was abandoned in the Atlantic Ocean before 30 August. She was on a voyage from New York, United States to Sligo.
Dalmatian	United Kingdom	The steamship was driven ashore in the Gulf of Smyrna. She was on a voyage from Constantinople, Ottoman Empire to Liverpool, Lancashire. She was refloated with the assistance of HMS Medina (Royal Navy) and resumed her voyage.
Dunnotar Castle	United Kingdom	The ship was run down and sunk by Hugh (United Kingdom).
George	United Kingdom	The ship was driven ashore on Saaremaa, Russia. She was on a voyage from Liverpool, Lancashire to Riga, Russia.
Georgiana	United Kingdom	The ship was abandoned in the Atlantic Ocean. She was on a voyage from Quebec City, Proving of Canada to Cork. She was discovered on 18 August by Liberty (United Kingdom) which put a crew member on board. Royal Family and Young Nova Scotian (both (United Kingdom of Great Britain and Ireland) British North America) also put crew on board and she was taken in to Queenstown, County Cork.
Golden Eagle	United States	The ship foundered. She was on a voyage from New York to Panama City, Granadine Confederation.
Gorilla	United Kingdom	The ship was wrecked in the White Sea off "Cape Orieffka", Russia.
Henry Moore	United Kingdom	The full-rigged ship struck a sunken rock off Point Romania, Straits Settlements and was beached at the Red Cliff. She was on a voyage from Calcutta, India to Hong Kong. She was refloated on 18 August with assistance from HMS Scout (Royal Navy) and towed in to Singapore.
James Zeo	United Kingdom	The full-rigged ship was lost off Cape Breton Island, Nova Scotia, British North America. She was on a voyage from Livorno, Italy to Quebec City, Province of Canada.
Japan	Netherlands	The ship ran aground on the Kingport Reef. She was on a voyage from South Shields, County Durham, United Kingdom to Batavia Netherlands East Indies. She was refloated and put in to Batavia in a leaky condition. She foundered whilst being taken in to "Onrust", Netherlands East Indies to be examined.
Mexican Eagle	United Kingdom	The ship was damaged by ice in Arksuth Fjord, Greenland. She was consequently condemned.
New Ulm Belle	United States	The 50-ton sternwheel paddle steamer struck a snag and sank in the Minnesota River in Minnesota.
Uncle Toby	United States	The ship was wrecked on the English Bank, in the River Plate. She was on a voyage from Portland, Maine to the River Plate.
Ville de Dieppe	France	The ship was wrecked at the Sand Heads, India. She was on a voyage from Moulmein, Burma to Belle Île, Morbihan.
