= List of shipwrecks in 1861 =

The list of shipwrecks in 1861 includes ships sunk, foundered, grounded, or otherwise lost during 1861.

table of contents
← 1860 / 1861 / 1862 →
Jan	Feb	Mar	Apr
May	Jun	Jul	Aug
Sep	Oct	Nov	Dec
Unknown date

== Unknown date ==
List of shipwrecks: Unknown date 1861
Ship	State	Description
A. B. Thompson	United States	American Civil War: Captured by the Confederate privateer Lady Davis (Confederate States of America) in 1861, the 980-ton full-rigged ship was scuttled as a blockship in the Savannah River in Georgia by Confederate forces in late 1861 or early 1862.
A. Holly	United States	American Civil War, Union blockade: The schooner was purchased in August 1861 to be scuttled as a blockship as part of the "Stone Fleet", but the location and date of her sinking are unknown.
Acadia	Unknown	The bark hit rocks in the Pacific Ocean on the coast of California at Trinidad and sank on either 4 February or 2 March.
Albion	Sweden–Norway	The barque was wrecked on the coast of Virginia 25 miles (40 km) below Cape Henry. Her cargo may have been salvaged in mid-May.
Alvarado	United States	American Civil War, Union blockade: The full-rigged ship was purchased in August 1861 to be scuttled as a blockship as part of the "Stone Fleet", but the location and date of her sinking are unknown. She may have been scuttled at Hatteras Inlet off the coast of North Carolina.
Anna Northup	United States	The 100-ton steamer was lost on the Red River of the North at Lower Fort Garry, Manitoba.
Bald Eagle	United States	The ship foundered after 13 October. Her crew were rescued by a Japanese fishing vessel. She was on a voyage from Hong Kong to San Francisco, California.
Baltimore	United States	The schooner was wrecked on the coast of Oregon at 43°21′03″N 124°23′00″W, about 0.6 mile (1 km) northwest of the Cape Arago Light.
Blackwater	United Kingdom	The ship was driven ashore at Stanley, Falkland Islands. She was on a voyage from Callao, Peru to Queenstown, County Cork.
Catherine	Unknown	American Civil War, Union blockade: During an attempt to run the Union blockade, the schooner was stranded at Sabine Pass on the border between Louisiana and Texas sometime during the American Civil War.
Conway	United Kingdom	The ship was abandoned in the Atlantic Ocean. She was taken in to Barbados in late February or early March in a derelict condition. Subsequently repaired.
Corea	United States	American Civil War, Union blockade: The 356-ton full-rigged ship was purchased in 1861 to be scuttled as a[blockship as part of the "Stone Fleet", but the location and date of her sinking are unknown. She may have been scuttled off the coast of Georgia nearSavannah.
Daniel Trowbridge	United States	American Civil War: The schooner was captured and burnt by CSS Sumter (Confederate States Navy. She was on a voyage from New York to Demerara, British Guiana.
Delaware Farmer	United States	American Civil War, Union blockade: The full-rigged ship was purchased in 1861 to be scuttled as a blockship as part of the "Stone Fleet", but the location and date of her sinking are unknown.
Dr. Kane	United States	The 191-ton sternwheel paddle steamer struck a snag and sank in deep water in the Ohio River 300 yards (274 meters) below the public wharf at Cairo, Illinois, sometime during the American Civil War.
Cuffey′s Cove	Unknown	The schooner was wrecked in Cuffey's Cove on the coast of Mendocino County, California.
E. D. Thompson	United States	American Civil War, Union blockade: The schooner was purchased in 1861 to be scuttled as a blockship as part of the "Stone Fleet", but the location and date of her sinking are unknown.
Edward	United States	American Civil War, Union blockade: The 340-ton bark was purchased in 1861 to be scuttled as a blockship as part of the "Stone Fleet", but the location and date of her sinking are unknown.
Ellen Goldsboro	United States	American Civil War, Union blockade: The schooner was purchased in 1861 to be scuttled as a blockship as part of the "Stone Fleet", but the location and date of her sinking are unknown.
Emerald	United States	American Civil War, Union blockade: The 518-ton full-rigged ship, part of the "Stone Fleet", was beached deliberately at Tybee Island, Georgia, in late December 1861 or early January 1862.
European	Unknown	The vessel was wrecked on the coast of California at Tomales Bay.
Friendship	United States	American Civil War, Union blockade: The schooner was purchased in 1861 to be scuttled as a blockship as part of the "Stone Fleet", but the location and date of her sinking are unknown.
General McNeil	Unknown	The sternwheel paddle steamer struck a snag and sank in the Missouri River at Howards Bend near St. Louis, Missouri, sometime during the 1860s.
George P. Upshur	United States	American Civil War, Union blockade: The schooner was purchased in 1861 to be scuttled as a blockship as part of the "Stone Fleet", but the location and date of her sinking are unknown.
Glentanner	United Kingdom	The immigrant ship was wrecked while departing Lyttelton, New Zealand, for a voyage to the United Kingdom.
Governor Bull	Unknown	The brig was lost in the vicinity of "Squan Beach", a term used at the time for the coast of New Jersey near Manasquan and sometimes for the 7-mile (11 km) stretch of coast between Manasquan Inlet and Cranberry Inlet or for the entire coast of New Jersey between Sea Girt and Barnegat Inlet.
Hartford	Unknown	The bark was wrecked on the Humboldt Bar in Humboldt Bay on the coast of California in either October 1861 or October 1864.
Harvest	United States	American Civil War, Union blockade: The 314-ton bark was purchased in 1861 to be scuttled as a blockship as part of the "Stone Fleet", but the location and date of her sinking are unknown.
Hero	United States	American Civil War, Union blockade: The schooner was purchased in 1861 to be scuttled as a blockship as part of the "Stone Fleet", but the location and date of her sinking are unknown.
J. D. James	United States	The sternwheel towboat sank in the Allegheny River 7 miles (11 km) above Oil City, Pennsylvania, in 1861 or 1862. She was refloated in May–June 1862.
John Alexander	United States	American Civil War, Union blockade: The schooner was purchased in 1861 to be scuttled as a blockship as part of the "Stone Fleet", but the location and date of her sinking are unknown.
John Carver	United States Army	The ship was burned at sea after being captured in the Atlantic Ocean by the privateer Jefferson Davis (Confederate States of America) during a voyage from Philadelphia, Pennsylvania, to Key West, Florida, with a cargo of anthracite.
Joseph Park	United States	American Civil War: The brig was captured and burnt by CSS Sumter (Confederate States Navy). She was on a voyage from Pernambuco, Brazil to Boston, Massachusetts.
Leveret	(United Kingdom of Great Britain and Ireland) Jersey	The fishing smack was driven ashore and wrecked at Beachy Head, Sussex.
Louisville	United States	The 155-ton sternwheel paddle steamer was lost, possibly on the Illinois River.
Marens	Unknown	The brig sank in the James River in Virginia sometime during the American Civil War.
Marmon	Unknown	The full-rigged ship was lost off Cape Flattery on the coast of Washington Territory.
Mary Frances	United States	American Civil War, Union blockade: The full-rigged ship was purchased in 1861 to be scuttled as a blockship as part of the "Stone Fleet", but the location and date of her sinking are unknown.
Merlin	United Kingdom	The ship foundered off Cape Horn, Chile. Her seventeen crew survived.
Monterey	United States	The 120-ton schooner was lost at Point Reyes on the coast of California in either November 1861 or November 1862.
Montezuma	United States	American Civil War, Union blockade: The 424-ton full-rigged ship was purchased in 1861 to be scuttled as a blockship as part of the "Stone Fleet", but the location and date of her sinking are unknown.
Mumford	(United Kingdom of Great Britain and Ireland) Tasmania	The schooner was wrecked near Dunedin, New Zealand. She was on a voyage from New Zealand to Hobart.
Nanjemoy	Confederate States of America	American Civil War: The full-rigged ship was sunk with no cargo aboard in shallow water in the Coan River in Virginia while operating as a blockade runner sometime between 1861 and 1863. The armed tug USS Yankee (United States Navy) refloated her as a prize on 15 July 1863.
Osiris	Confederate States of America	American Civil War, Union blockade: The 145- or 183-ton sidewheel paddle steamer, operated as a ferry by the Confederate Quartermaster Department on the coast of South Carolina between Charleston, Castle Pickney, and Sullivn's Island, was destroyed by a fire allegedly set by Union sympathizers sometime during the American Civil War (1861-1865).
Patriot	United States	American Civil War, Union blockade: The schooner was purchased in 1861 to be scuttled as a blockship as part of the "Stone Fleet", but the location and date of her sinking are unknown.
Portsmouth	United States	The sternwheel paddle steamer struck a snag and sank in the Missouri River at the mouth of Bee Creek, about 3 miles (5 km) below Weston, Missouri.
Queen of Freedom	United Kingdom	The barque was lost between 13 March and 4 October with the loss of all fourteen crew. She was on a voyage from London to Colombo, Ceylon.
Red Fox	Confederate States of America	The 78-ton sternwheel paddle steamer sank in the Mississippi River at Island Number Ten in late 1861.
Sarah M. Kemp	United States	American Civil War, Union blockade: The schooner was purchased in 1861 to be scuttled as a blockship as part of the "Stone Fleet", but the location and date of her sinking are unknown.
Satellite	(United Kingdom of Great Britain and Ireland) New Zealand	The schooner was wrecked at the mouth of the Taieri River, New Zealand, late in the year.
Somerfield	United States	American Civil War, Union blockade: The schooner was purchased in 1861 to be scuttled as a blockship as part of the "Stone Fleet", but the location and date of her sinking are unknown.
Southerner	United States	American Civil War, Union blockade: The schooner was purchased in 1861 to be scuttled as a blockship as part of the "Stone Fleet", but the location and date of her sinking are unknown.
South Wind	United States	American Civil War, Union blockad]: The schooner was purchased in 1861 to be scuttled as a blockship as part of the "Stone Fleet", but the location and date of her sinking are unknown.
Staghound	United Kingdom	The ship was destroyed by fire. She was on a voyage from Sunderland, County Durham to San Francisco, California, United States.
St. Andrew	United Kingdom	The whaler was wrecked on rocks in the Davis Strait (66°20′N 53°40′W) before 7 September.
Stella	United Kingdom	The ship foundered in the North Sea with the presumed loss of all hands. She had been missing for some months when wreckage washed up on Juist, Duchy of Holstein on 2 February 1862.
Union	United Kingdom	The whaler was lost in Cumberland Sound.
Villiers	United Kingdom	The brigantine was wrecked on the Mixon Shoal in the Bristol Channel with the loss of two of her eight crew. She was on a voyage from Cardiff, Glamorgan, Wales, to Alicante, Spain.
Willamette	United States	Bound from San Francisco, California, to either Shoalwater Bay or Willapa Bay in Washington Territory, the 180-ton schooner was wrecked at the mouth of Shoalwater Bay with the loss of two lives.
W. L. Bartlett	United States	American Civil War, Union blockade: The schooner was purchased in 1861 to be scuttled as a blockship as part of the "Stone Fleet", but the location and date of her sinking are unknown.
William B. Romer	United States	The pilot schooner was wrecked on a submerged rock – later named Romer Shoal – in New York Harbor off New York City sometime during the American Civil War (April 1861–April 1865). One pilot lost his life in the wreck.
William L. Jones	United States	American Civil War, Union blockade: The schooner was purchased in 1861 to be scuttled as a blockship as part of the "Stone Fleet", but the location and date of her sinking are unknown.
Wowleebelay	Flag unknown	The ship foundered off the mouth of the Yangtze. Her crew were rescued.
W. W. Burns	United States	American Civil War, Union blockade: The schooner was purchased in 1861 to be scuttled as a blockship as part of the "Stone Fleet", but the location and date of her sinking are unknown.
Wythe	Unknown	The schooner sank in the James River in Virginia sometime during the American Civil War (1861-1865).
Unidentified barges	Confederate States of America	American Civil War: Confederate forces scuttled the barges as blockships in the James River at the mouth of the Warwick River in Virginia in August and September.
Unidentified hulk	Unknown	American Civil War: Confederate forces scuttled the hulk at Galveston, Texas.
Three unidentified schooners	Confederate States of America	American Civil War: Confederate forces scuttled the schooners in Virginia 2 to 3 miles (3.2 to 4.8 km) from the mouth of the Blackwater River in 1861 or 1862, sometime prior to the gunboat USS Hunchback (United States Navy) moving one of them on 23 May 1862 in order to steam up the river.
Four unidentified ships	Confederate States of America	American Civil War: Confederate forces scuttled four old ships loaded with granite in the Main Ship Channel of Charleston Harbor at Charleston, South Carolina, as blockships in early 1861 to obstruct Union access to Fort Sumter.
Unidentified vessel	United States	American Civil War: After being captured by the Confederate privateer Florida (Confederate States of America), the vessel was run aground on the coast of North Carolina at Nag's Head by her prize crew to prevent her recapture by a Union ship.
