= List of shipwrecks in 1860 =

The list of shipwrecks in 1860 includes ships sunk, foundered, grounded, or otherwise lost during 1860.

table of contents
← 1859 / 1860 / 1861 →
Jan	Feb	Mar	Apr
May	Jun	Jul	Aug
Sep	Oct	Nov	Dec
Unknown date

== Unknown date ==
List of shipwrecks: Unknown date 1860
Ship	State	Description
Active	United Kingdom	The ship was lost at sea.
Africa	United States	The ship ran aground in the Gaspar Strait and was wrecked. Her crew were rescued by the barque Hendrika (Netherlands). Africa was on a voyage from Cardiff, Glamorgan, United Kingdom to Shanghai, China. She was subsequently attacked by pirates and set afire.
Alert	United Kingdom	The barque was driven ashore and wrecked at Madras, India.
Alfred and Claire	France	The ship was driven ashore at the mouth of the Rio Grande del Norte between 5 May and 14 June. She was on a voyage from Pernambuco to Rio de Janeiro, Brazil. She was refloated and put back to Pernambuco for repairs.
Asa Wilgus	United States	The sidewheel paddle steamer sank in the Missouri River below Hermann, Missouri.
Atalanta	United States	After the Wisconsin Central Railroad ceased service to Lake Geneva, Wisconsin, in the autumn of 1860, the 65-foot (20 m) screw steamer was laid up on Geneva Lake due to unprofitability. Her steam engine was subsequently removed, and she later burned to the waterline. Her wreck remained visible on the coast of Geneva Lake off Lake Geneva until 1874.
Augaum	United Kingdom	The barque ran aground at the mouth of the River Wear. she was on a voyage from Quebec City, Province of Canada, British North America to Sunderland, County Durham. She was refloated and taken in to the River Tyne and beached. She was refloated in early March 1861 and towed in to South Shields, County Durham for repairs.
Belle Peoria	United States	The sidewheel paddle steamer burned. After repairs, she returned to service in 1862.
Caroline	United Kingdom	The ship was abandoned. She was on a voyage from Swansea, Glamorgan to Alicante, Spain.
Caura	United States	The brig departed from Gibraltar for New York in or about September. She subsequently foundered in the Atlantic Ocean. Her crew survived.
Chatsworth	United States	The full-rigged ship was wrecked 55 nautical miles (102 km) south of Valparaíso, Chile. Her crew were rescued.
Dawn	United Kingdom	The ship was lost at sea. Her four crew survived. She was on a voyage from Swansea to Havre de Grâce, Seine-Inférieure, France.
DeWitt Clinton	Unknown	The full-rigged ship was lost on the coast of New Jersey 7 miles (11 km) south of "Squan Inlet". "Squan" and "Squan Beach" were terms used at the time for the coast of New Jersey near Manasquan and sometimes for the 7-mile (11 km) stretch of coast between Manasquan Inlet and Cranberry Inlet or for the entire coast of New Jersey between Sea Girt and Barnegat Inlet. "Squan Inlet" may refer to Manasquan Inle or another inlet in the "Squan" area.
Elphinstone	Royal Indian Marine	The ship was lost in the Persian Gulf.
Evangeline	United Kingdom	The schooner was lost. Her three crew survived. She was on a voyage from London to Constantinople, Ottoman Empire.
General McNeil	Unknown	The sternwheel paddle steamer struck a snag and sank in the Missouri River at Howards Bend near St. Louis, Missouri, sometime during the 1860s.
Hastings	United Kingdom	The ship foundered. Twenty-seven crew were rescued by Chevreuil (France.
Miss Nightingale	United Kingdom	The schooner foundered with the loss of all seven crew. She was on a voyage from London to the Canary Islands.
Oliver Putnam	United States	The ship foundered in the Indian Ocean between 24 April and 19 August. At least seven crew survived. She was on a voyage from Liverpool, Lancashire, United Kingdom to Calcutta, India.
Phœnix	United Kingdom	The ship was destroyed by fire at Melbourne, Victoria.
