= USS Belle Italia =

Gunboat of the United States Navy

History

United States
- In service: 1862
- Captured: by Union Navy forces; July 9, 1862
- Fate: not known

General characteristics
- Propulsion: sail

USS Belle Italia was a sloop captured by the Union Navy during the American Civil War. She was used by the Union Navy as a gunboat in support of the Union Navy blockade of Confederate waterways.

== Service history ==
On July 9, 1862, the commanding officer of the Union bark Arthur, Acting Volunteer Lieutenant John W. Kittredge, temporarily left that warship and embarked in the tender Corypheus whose shallow draft permitted her to operate in the shoal waters of Aransas Bay, Texas. The following day, at the town of Aransas on San Jose Island, Corypheus captured the small sloop, Belle Italia, which Kittredge thereafter used as another tender to Arthur. Although she was active along the Texas coast into the autumn of 1862, Belle Italia apparently was never placed in commission. No logs, and few other records of her service, have survived. However, Arthur took part in significant operations off Corpus Christi, Texas, during the summer of 1862.

=== Battle of Corpus Christi ===
At noon on August 12, 1862, in Aransas Bay, Belle Italia, the gunboat USS Sachem, and the schooner Reindeer accompanied Corypheus through an artificial canal into Corpus Christi Bay. There they chased and forced ashore the armed schooner USS Breaker which had formerly served as a pilot boat at Pass Cavallo. The Union sailors boarded the grounded vessel and extinguished a fire that had been started by her crew before they escaped. The boarding party then refloated the schooner and claimed her as a prize. Confederates in the bay also set ablaze and abandoned the armed schooner Elma and the sloop Hannah. The small Union squadron then decided to attack Corpus Christi. On August 13, 1862, a party went ashore and demanded, as Kittredge later reported, "the evacuation of the place by the military, but consented to the inhabitants remaining, promising to respect their private property..." Kittredge warned the Texans, on the other hand, that "...they must remove their women and children if they intended to make a stand."

At dawn on the 17th, after the passage of 48 hours during which they were allowed to evacuate the town's noncombatants, the defenders opened fire upon the Union ships that promptly replied spiritedly, silencing the Confederate Fort Kinney. When the ships ceased their bombardment, the Southerners returned to their guns and resumed firing. The reply from the ships again forced the Confederate cannoneers to seek shelter. Only Kittredge's withdrawing his ships out of range at nightfall ended this cycle. About half an hour before midnight, however, the Confederates set fire to steamer A. B. that was stranded in the narrow and shallow channel leading from Corpus Christi to Nueces Bay. Kittredge later made "...several ineffectual efforts to haul her off..." before she burned to the water's edge. On the 18th, the flotilla moved into position for another attack on the Southern fort. Covered by guns from the other warships, Belle Italia landed a 12-pounder rifled howitzer and a party of 30 men "...with a view of getting in position to take the enemy's battery." The Union sailors advanced toward the enemy guns and, upon reaching range, opened fire with both the howitzer and muskets. Meanwhile, the cannoneers on board Kittredge's ships entered the fray.

The combined barrage soon silenced the battery, but Texan infantry and cavalry counterattacked. Ships' gunfire helped hold the charging Confederates back and allowed the landing force to return to Belle Italia after running out of ammunition. The Union ships then shelled the town where the Southern soldiers had sought shelter. A dwindling supply of ammunition prompted Kittredge to withdraw into Aransas Bay to await Arthur's return from New Orleans, Louisiana, with supplies and ammunition.

=== Later operations ===
Belle Italia next appears in an expedition back to Corpus Christi to secure the release of the family of Judge Edmund Jackson Davis, a prominent political figure in Texas who had remained loyal to the Union and had escaped into exile to serve its cause. Kittredge, again in Corypheus, entered Corpus Christi Bay with the Union schooner USS Breaker and landed under a flag of truce to ask that he be allowed to embark Mrs. Davis and reunite her with her husband. The Confederate commanding officer at Corpus Christi tentatively refused the request pending the decision of General Hamilton P. Bee who commanded Southern forces in Texas. While awaiting Bee's decision, Kittredge proceeded to Flour Bluffs where Belle Italia rejoined his small force.

The next morning, the sloop joined in the shelling of several small vessels that escaped into the shallow waters of Laguna de la Madre where the Union ships could not follow. Kittredge landed a small reconnaissance party and took three prisoners before returning to Corypheus. The following morning, Kittredge again went ashore where he and his party of seven men were captured by a large group of Southern soldiers. Because of fear of harming Kittredge (who would ultimately be dismissed from the service a year later) and his men, Belle Italia and her consorts were unable to fire on the enemy ashore. Belle Italia is noted as being in Aransas Bay on October 15, 1862. No further mention of her appears in the official Navy records.
