= List of shipwrecks in 1862 =

The list of shipwrecks in 1862 includes ships sunk, foundered, grounded, or otherwise lost during 1862.

table of contents
1862
Jan	Feb	Mar	Apr
May	Jun	Jul	Aug
Sep	Oct	Nov	Dec
Unknown date

== Unknown date ==
List of shipwrecks: Unknown date 1862
Ship	State	Description
A. B. Thompson	United States	American Civil War: Captured by the Confederate privateer Lady Davis (Confederate States of America) in 1861, the 980-ton full-rigged ship was scuttled as a blockship in the Savannah River in Georgia by Confederate forces in late 1861 or early 1862.
Agnes Willie	United States	Bound from Green Bay, Wisconsin, for an unknown destination with a cargo of apples, the vessel capsized in Lake Michigan 7 nautical miles (13 km; 8.1 mi) off Baileys Harbor, Wisconsin. Both people aboard survived, but she drifted ashore and was wrecked.
Alexander	Flag unknown	The schooner was wrecked off Wilmington, North Carolina, Confederate States of America.
Belle Italia	Confederate States of America	American Civil War: The sloop or schooner was scuttled as a blockship in the Main Ship Channel at Corpus Christi, Texas after 10 July. She was refloated on 15 August and returned to service.
Belle Peoria	United States	The sidewheel paddle steamer was wrecked in the Missouri River at Fort Buford in the Dakota Territory sometime between 1862 and 1864. She was repaired and returned to service.
Black Hawk No. 2	United States	The 57- or 211-ton sidewheel paddle steamer struck a snag and sank without loss of life in the Missouri River at the mouth of Bee Creek, 2 miles (3.2 km) below Weston, Missouri.
California	Confederate States of America	American Civil War: The 77-ton schooner was scuttled as a blockship at the Dog River Bar in Mobile Bay, Alabama, in 1862 or 1863.
Catherine	Flag unknown	American Civil War, Union blockade: During an attempt to run the Union blockade, the schooner was stranded at Sabine Pass on the border between Louisiana and Texas sometime during the American Civil War.
Chieftain	United Kingdom	The whaler was lost in the Davis Strait. Her crew, at least 28 people, survived.
Colonel Clay	Confederate States of America	American Civil War: The 257-ton sidewheel paddle steamer was scuttled as a blockship at the Dog River Bar in Mobile Bay, Alabama, in 1862 or 1863.
Cremona	Confederate States of America	American Civil War: Loaded with bricks, the sternwheel paddle steamer was scuttled as a blockship at the Dog River Bar.
CSS Curtis Peck	Confederate States Navy	American Civil War: Confederate forces scuttled the 446-ton sidewheel paddle steamer as a blockship in the James River in Virginia below Drewry's Bluff either in mid-May or in September.
Cyclops	Flag unknown	During a voyage from San Francisco, California, to Coquille, Oregon, the schooner was wrecked on Coos Bay Bar in Coos Bay off the coast of Oregon either in 1858 or in the spring of 1862.
Damascus	Confederate States of America	American Civil War: The vessel was sunk as a blockship in the James River below Drewry's Bluff in late 1862.
Dr. Kane	United States	The 191-ton sternwheel paddle steamer struck a snag and sank in deep water in the Ohio River 300 yards (274 meters) below the public wharf at Cairo, Illinois, sometime during the American Civil War.
Dunbar	Confederate States of America	American Civil War: The steamer was sunk in Cypress Creek along the Tennessee River to prevent her capture by Union forces after the surrender of Fort Henry, Tennessee, to Union forces on 6 February.
Eclipse	Confederate States of America	American Civil War: Loaded with bricks, the 156-ton sternwheel paddle steamer was scuttled as a blockship at the Dog River Bar.
Efina Kuyne	Netherlands	The galliot was wrecked at Half Moon Bay on the coast of California, United States.
Elizabeth Campbell	United Kingdom	The ship departed from Trinidad for the Clyde. No further trace, presumed foundered with the loss of all hands.
Emerald	United States	American Civil War, Union blockade: The 518-ton full-rigged ship, part of the "Stone Fleet", was beached deliberately at Tybee Island, Georgia, Confederate States of America in late December 1861 or early January 1862.
Energy	Flag unknown	The brig was wrecked on Coos Bay Bar with the loss of all but one of her crew.
Ewing	Confederate States of America	American Civil War: The steamer, a Privateer, was burned at dock in Pensacola Bay to prevent capture.
Frederick Greff	United States Army	The 46-ton sidewheel paddle steamer was reported sunk by ice, possibly in Aquia Creek in Virginia.
General McNeil	Flag unknown	The sternwheel paddle steamer struck a snag and sank in the Missouri River at Howards Bend near St. Louisi, sometime during the 1860s.
Hazard	Flag unknown	The brig was lost at "Squan Inlet". "Squan" and "Squan Beach" were terms used at the time for the coast of New Jersey near Manasquan and sometimes for the 7-mile (11 km) stretch of coast between Manasquan Inlet and Cranberry Inlet or for the entire coast of New Jersey between Sea Girt and Barnegat Inlet. "Squan Inlet" could refer to Manasquan Inlet or another inlet in the area.
Hoboken	United States	American Civil War, Burnside's North Carolina Expedition: The 530-ton sidewheel paddle steamer was lost on 1 or 2 January or in February during the expedition to the coastal area of North Carolina.
I. W. Hancox	United States	The steam tug was lost off the coast of Texas, Confederate States of America in late 1862.
J. D. James	United States	The sternwheel towboat sank in the Allegheny River 7 miles (11 km) above Oil City, Pennsylvania, in 1861 or 1862. She was refloated in May or June 1862.
CSS J. D. Swain	Confederate States Navy	American Civil War: The 1,228-ton sidewheel paddle steamer sank in the East Pearl River in Louisiana near the mouth of McCall's River. Union forces refloated her in early April 1864, repaired her, and placed her in Union service.
J. J. Crittenden	Confederate States of America	American Civil War: The schooner was captured by the gunboat USS Whitehead (United States Navy) on 10 April off Newbegun Creek, North Carolina, in 1862 and subsequently was scuttled as a blockship in the Currituck Lock of the Albemarle and Chesapeake Canal in North Carolina.
John	(United Kingdom of Great Britain and Ireland) New Zealand	The trading schooner was wrecked in the Hauraki Gulf sometime prior to 8 July, with the loss of two crew and one passenger. The remains of the passenger were found on 23 August near Gull Point (now Toroa Point), Torbay.
John Roach	Confederate States of America	American Civil War: The vessel was sunk as a blockship in the James River below Drewry's Bluff in late 1862.
Kentucky Brig	Confederate States of America	American Civil War: Loaded with bricks, the vessel was scuttled as a blockship at the Dog River Bar.
Kossuth	Flag unknown	The full-rigged ship was lost off Dungeness Spit on the coast of Washington Territory.
Laura	Flag unknown	American Civil War: The 83-ton sternwheel paddle steamer was lost in Florida, Confederate States of America.
Lillie Knowles	United States	The barque collided with the clipper Aurora (United States) and was severely damaged. Lillie Knowles was on a voyage from New York to Shanghai, China. She was escorted in to Hong Kong by Aurora.
Marens	Flag unknown	The brig sank in the James River sometime during the American Civil War.
Monterey	United States	The 120-ton schooner was lost at Point Reyes on the coast of California in either November 1861 or November 1862.
Morning	(United Kingdom of Great Britain and Ireland) British North America	The steamship was beaten to pieces in a violent snowstorm on Lake Simcoe. Her remains have since deteriorated.
Nanjemoy	Confederate States of America	American Civil War: The full-rigged ship was sunk with no cargo aboard in shallow water in the Coan River in Virginia while operating as a blockade runner sometime between 1861 and 1863. The armed tug USS Yankee (United States Navy) refloated her as a prize on 15 July 1863.
USS Noble	United States Navy	American Civil War: The barque was [scuttled as a blockship near Savannah, Georgia, Confederate States of America as part of the Stone Fleet in early 1862.
Osiris	Confederate States of America	American Civil War: The 145- or 183-ton sidewheel paddle steamer, operated as a ferry by the Confederate Quartermaster Department on the coast of South Carolina between Charleston, Castle Pickney, and Sullivn's Island, was destroyed by a fire allegedly set by Union sympathizers sometime during the American Civil War.
Paint Rock	Confederate States of America	American Civil War: The Confederates scuttled the steamer either in Alabama or at Chattanooga, Tennessee, to prevent her capture by Union forces.
Prince Albert	(United Kingdom of Great Britain and Ireland) New Zealand	The brig was wrecked off the south coast of South Island late in 1862, possibly in October. It had been recovering cargo abandoned during the wreck of the Flying Mist on 26 August.
Royal Shoal Lightship	Confederate States of America	The lightship sank in the Neuse River in North Carolina. She was refloated later in the year by the wrecking vessel Dirigo (Flag unknown).
Saint Mary′s	Confederate States of America	American Civil War: The 337-ton sidewheel paddle steamer was scuttled by Confederate forces in McGirt's Creek or Haw Haw Creek 5 miles (8 km) from Jacksonville, Florida, in either March or May 1862. She was refloated, repaired, and returned to Confederate service.
Sebusticook	United States	American Civil War: The 549- or 560-ton full-rigged ship was scuttled as a blockship in the Savannah River in Georgia.
Sond Gamrieb	Denmark	The whaler was lost in the Davis Strait. Her crew survivec.
Stag	Confederate States of America	American Civil War: The steamer was sunk near Franklin Depot in the Blackwater River in Virginia. The gunboat USS Hunchback (United States Navy) discovered her wreck on 29 May.
Standard	United Kingdom	American Civil War, Union blockade: Trapped in April 1862 by Union forces in the North Newport River in Georgia with 10 people and a cargo of groceries, medicine, boots, lead, and gun caps, the 110-ton brig was scuttled off St. Catherines Island.
Stephen Decatur	United States	The 308-ton sidewheel paddle steamer sank in the Mississippi River at Devil's Island below St. Louis, Missouri, sometime between 1862 and 1865. She later was refloated.
CSS United States	Confederate States Navy	American Civil War: The receiving ship, also known unofficially as CSS Confederate States, was scuttled as a blockship in the Elizabeth River, Virginia in April or May.
White Falcon	United States	The clipper was driven ashore and damaged at Foo Chow, China. She was refloated.
William B. Romer	United States	The pilot schooner was wrecked on submerged rock – later named Romer Shoal – in New York Harbor off New York City sometime during the American Civil War. One pilot lost his life in the wreck.
Winfield Scott	United States Army	The steam transport was lost on the coast of South Carolina, either wrecked in Skull Creek near Port Royal Sound in January or lost at Daufuskie Island in February.
Wythe	Flag unknown	The schooner sank in the James River in Virginia sometime during the American Civil War (1861–1865).
Yazoo	Confederate States of America	American Civil War: Left behind by Confederate forces when they evacuated Island Number 10 in the Mississippi River after the Battle of Island Number Ten on 7 April 1862, the sidewheel steamboat was captured by Union forces and later scuttled.
Two unidentified brigs	Confederate States of America	American Civil War: The brig were scuttled as a blockship in the Neuse River 3 miles (5 km) below New Bern, North Carolina.
Unidentified light ship	Confederate States of America	The light ship sank in the Rappahannock River in front of Fort Lowry, Virginia, sometime before April 1862.
Unidentified schooner	Confederate States of America	American Civil War: The schooner was blown up by the submarine Pioneer (Confederate States of America) in Lake Pontchartrain in Louisiana while Pioneer was undergoing trials in the early months of 1862.
Unidentified schooner	United States	Carrying a cargo of coal, the schooner was wrecked on Hatteras Bar off Cape Hatteras, North Carolina, during a gale in early 1862.
Two unidentified schooners	Confederate States of America	American Civil War: The schooners were sunk near Franklin Depot in the Blackwater River in Virginia. The gunboat USS Hunchback (United States Navy) discovered their wrecks on 29 May.
Three unidentified schooners	Confederate States of America	American Civil War: Confederate forces scuttled the schooners in Virginia 2 to 3 miles (3.2 to 4.8 km) from the mouth of the Blackwater River in 1861 or 1862, sometime prior to the gunboat USS Hunchback (United States Navy) moving one of them on 23 May 1862 in order to steam up the river.
Two unidentified vessels	Confederate States of America	American Civil War: Loaded with stone, the two vessels were scuttled as blockships in the Main Ship Channel at Corpus Christi, Texas sometime after 10 July and before mid-August.
