= USS Arthur =

Gunboat of the United States Navy

History

United States
- Laid down: date unknown
- Launched: 1855
- Acquired: 1 August 1861
- Commissioned: 11 December 1861
- Decommissioned: date not known
- Stricken: not known
- Fate: not known

General characteristics
- Tonnage: 554
- Length: 133 ft (41 m)
- Beam: 31 ft 2 in (9.50 m)
- Draft: 14 ft 1 in (4.29 m)
- Depth of hold: 7 ft 3 in (2.21 m)
- Propulsion: sail
- Speed: 10 knots
- Complement: 86
- Armament: six 32-pounder smoothbore guns

USS Arthur was a bark acquired by the Union Navy during the American Civil War. She was used by the Union Navy as a gunboat in support of the Union Navy blockade of Confederate waterways.

== Arthur commissioned in New York City ==
On 1 August 1861, Arthur—a bark built at Amesbury, Massachusetts, in 1855—was purchased at New York City by the Union Navy. Fitted out at the New York Navy Yard, she was commissioned there on 11 December 1861, Acting Volunteer Lieutenant John W. Kittredge in command.

== Assigned to the Gulf Blockading Squadron ==
Arthur sailed south on Christmas Eve, 1861, joined the Gulf Blockading Squadron at Key West, Florida, and then proceeded to the coast of Texas to patrol the waters between Matagorda and Corpus Christi, Texas. This was familiar territory for Kittredge, who had spent several years trading along the Texas seaboard before the Civil War. Arthur reached station off Matagorda on the morning of 25 January.

=== Arthur captures blockade runner J. J. McNeil ===
Later that day, some 17 miles northeast of the bar at Pass Cavallo, she sighted a schooner sailing toward shore. Kittredge called the crew to quarters and sent two cutters in pursuit of the stranger which was attempting to run aground. A shot from the bark brought the quarry to. A boarding party from the cutters took possession of the schooner, which proved to be the Confederate blockade runner J.J. McNeil. The prize—which had left Veracruz, Mexico, with a cargo of coffee and tobacco—was sent to Ship Island, Mississippi, and on to New York City for adjudication.

=== Failed expedition into the Cedar Bayou ===
On 13 February, the brig exchanged fire with a cavalry troop on shore near Aransas, Texas. About noon on 21 April, Kittredge led an expedition of three boats into Cedar Bayou, Texas, where they chased the schooner Burkhart which escaped because of her master's knowledge of nearby channels. The next day, they captured three small sloops, but were forced to abandon their prizes—along with two of their own boats—to escape attacks by a numerically superior Confederate force. Kittredge and his party managed to escape without injury.

=== Spring 1862 operations ===
During the spring of 1862, Flag Officer David Glasgow Farragut, the squadron commander, reinforced Kittredge with the yacht USS Corypheus, purchased from the Key West prize court, and the screw gunboat USS Sachem. Besides these tenders, General Butler—a lugger about which little is known—was also at Kittredge's disposal for operations in the shallow inlets, bays, and bayous found in Arthur's sector.

=== Capturing the schooner Reindeer after a chase ===
On 9 July, Kittredge entered Aransas Bay in Corypheus. Upon approaching, he sighted a "….schooner apparently lying on her beam ends...." He then armed the second cutter and ran down through the reefs to her.

Upon seeing the approaching Union ship, the schooner's crew righted their vessel—which they had careened for caulking—and cast adrift a cotton-laden, flat-bottomed barge which had been moored to a nearby wharf while the schooner was being prepared for an attempt to run the blockade. The schooner began leaking rapidly the moment she was again upright, and was soon swamped.

Kittredge returned to Corypheus, and got underway ". . . in pursuit of a schooner that had just passed to the southward . . . ." He soon found his quarry, the schooner named Reindeer, at anchor, captured by General Butler.

=== Capturing additional Southern vessels while in the Gulf Squadron ===
On 10 July, Corypheus captured the 9-ton sloop Belle Italia. A few days later, she reentered the gulf where Kittredge returned to Arthur.

Arthur took the armed schooner USS Breaker at Aransas on 12 August and, on that same day at Corpus Christi, Texas, forced the Confederates to burn the armed schooner Elma and sloop Hannah to prevent their capture. On the 15th, she added to her list of victims the steamer A. B. (sometimes spelled A. Bee) which had run aground in the narrow and shallow channel that leads to Nueces Bay near Corpus Christi. After several unsuccessful efforts to refloat that prize, Kittredge put the torch to her.

Finally, shortly after dawn on 24 August, the yacht Corypheus—still working under the direction of Kittredge—captured Water Witch of Jamaica as that schooner attempted to enter Aransas Bay with a cargo including a large quantity of gunpowder.

=== Attempting to negotiate the release of Judge Edmund Jackson Davis' family ===
Early in September, David Farragut asked Kittredge to attempt to arrange the release of the family of Judge Edmund Jackson Davis, a prominent political leader in Texas who had remained loyal to the Union and had left his home to serve the Federal cause. On 12 September, Kittredge proceeded under a flag of truce to Corpus Christi where the Confederate commanding officer there refused to allow Mrs. Davis to leave Texas, but promised to refer the matter to the Confederate commander in Texas. While awaiting the commander's decision, Kittredge proceeded to Flour Bluff.

=== Kittredge and his landing party captured by the Confederates ===
The next morning, Kittredge's ships joined in the shelling of several small vessels that escaped into the shallow waters of Laguna de la Madre where the Union ships could not follow. Kittredge landed a small reconnaissance party and took three prisoners before returning to Corypheus. The following morning, Kittredge again went ashore where he and his party of seven men were captured by a large group of Southern soldiers. Because of fear of harming Kittredge (who would ultimately be dismissed from the service a year later) and his men, Kittredge's ships were unable to fire on the enemy ashore.

== Final Civil War operations ==
The Navy record for Arthur is incomplete at this point. Her final operations are not known at this time.

== Note ==
See USS Belle Italia (1862) for more detail on Kittredge's activities during this period of time.
