= Charles G. Løvenskiold =

Danish-American lawyer and military officer (1822–1875)

- Born: Charles Grimus Thorkeli de Løvenskiold; February 3, 1822; Copenhagen, Denmark
- Died: March 9, 1875 (aged 53); Corpus Christi, Texas, US
- Children: 7, including Oscar
- Relatives: Løvenskiold family
- Military career
- Allegiance: Confederate States of America
- Branch: Confederate States Army
- Rank: Colonel
- Unit: Walker Mounted Rifles
- Conflicts: American Civil War
- Other work: Lawyer

Charles Grimus Thorkeli de Løvenskiold (February 3, 1822 – March 9, 1875) was a Danish-born American lawyer and military officer. He was a member of the Confederate States Army during the American Civil War.

== Biography ==
Løvenskiold was born on February 3, 1822, in Copenhagen, one of seven children born to Baron Frederick Stephanus Løvenskiold and Charlotte Elizabeth (née de Tuxen) Løvenskiold. He was of Danish and Icelandic descent. His father was attorney general to the king, with him inheriting his father's Baron title.

Løvenskiold was educated at elite European schools. In 1847, he moved to Florida, and in 1848 moved to New Orleans. In 1849, he moved to Houston, then to Galveston, Texas in the same year. In 1853, he opened a school which he served as superintendent of; it closed at the outbreak of the American Civil War. He moved to Corpus Christi in 1855, where he practiced law.

In Corpus Christi, Løvenskiold was captain of a local militia company. In 1860, he was accused of using the militia to sway an election by transferring weaponry into private ownership. During the American Civil War, he was a colonel of the Walker Mounted Rifles, a private cavalary company of the Confederate States Army. After the war, he served on the Corpus Christi City Council until his death.

In 1849, Løvenskiold married Sophia F. Clark; they had seven children together, including Oscar, Mayor of Corpus Christi, Texas. He spoke Danish, English, French, German, and Italian. He was a member of the Freemasons. He died on March 9, 1875, aged 53, in Corpus Christi.
