= List of shipwrecks in 1859 =

The list of shipwrecks in 1859 includes ships sunk, foundered, grounded, or otherwise lost during 1859.

table of contents
1859
Jan	Feb	Mar	Apr
May	Jun	Jul	Aug
Sep	Oct	Nov	Dec
Unknown date

== Unknown date ==
List of shipwrecks: Unknown date 1859
Ship	State	Description
Agnes Taylor	United Kingdom	The ship was wrecked at Demerara, British Guiana. Her crew were rescued.
Audubon	United States	The ship was destroyed by fire at Batavia, Netherlands East Indies. She was on a voyage from Singapore, Straits Settlements to New York.
Brutus	United States	The ship was destroyed by fire at Calcutta, India.
Bueres	United Kingdom	The barque was destroyed by fire at a port in India.
Canton	United Kingdom	The paddle steamer was wrecked in a gale at Macao, China.
Civilian	United States	The ship was abandoned off Cape Horn, Chile. She was on a voyage from Callao, Peru to New York.
Cygnet	United Kingdom	The ship was lost on the Mosquito Coast. Her crew were rescued.
Gomelza	United Kingdom	The full-rigged ship was lost in the Pacific Ocean. Her crew were rescued. She was on a voyage from London to Vancouver Island, Colony of British Columbia. Also reported to have sunk in the Hood Canal, Washington Territory.
Good Hope	United Kingdom	The ship foundered in the Irish Sea. She was on a voyage from Cardigan to Milford Haven, Pembrokeshire.
Herald of the Morning	(United Kingdom of Great Britain and Ireland) British North America	The clipper struck a sperm whale off Cape Horn, Cape Colony and was damaged.
Holder Borean	United States	The ship was wrecked in the Pacific Ocean.
Hoop van Capelle	Netherlands	The ship sank at Batavia, Netherlands East Indies between 25 July and 9 August.
Ireland Queen	United Kingdom	The ship was lost in the Red Sea.
Isaac Holder	United States	The ship was wrecked in the Pacific Ocean.
Ithuriel	United Kingdom	The barque foundered in the Atlantic Ocean. All seventeen people on board were rescued by the brig Chatham (United States). Ithuriel was on a voyage from New York, United States to Liverpool, Lancashire.
John Franklin	United States	The schooner was lost while coming from Prince Edward Island for Gloucester, Massachusetts in the winter of 1858—59. Lost with all 6 hands, plus passengers, up to 14 lives lost.
John R. Stanley	Unknown	The schooner was lost in the vicinity of "Squan Beach," a term used at the time for the coast of New Jersey near Manasquan and sometimes for the 7-mile (11 km) stretch of coast between Manasquan Inlet and Cranberry Inlet or for the entire coast of New Jersey between Sea Girt and Barnegat Inlet.
Kitty	Hudson's Bay Company	The ship was crushed by ice and sank in Hudson's Bay. Her crew were rescued.
Kitty	United Kingdom	The ship departed from London for Port Adelaide, South Australia. No further trace, presumed foundered with the loss of all hnads.
Kona Hassett	United States	The ship was wrecked in the Pacific Ocean.
Lord William Bentinck	United Kingdom	The ship foundered whilst on a voyage from London to Valparaíso, Chile.
Manitou	United States	The clipper departed from New York for San Francisco, California. No further trace.
Northumbria's Daughter	United Kingdom	The barque was destroyed by fire at Aden.
Ost	Prussia	The ship was wrecked on the Scarborough Shoal between 12 October and 9 November. Her crew were rescued. She was on a voyage from Hong Kong to Melbourne, Victoria.
Peruvian	United Kingdom	The ship was wrecked on Gillies Reef, off Belize City, British Honduras. Her crew were rescued.
Queen of Clippers	United States	The fishing schooner was lost in the Newfoundland fishery in the winter of 1858—59. Lost with all 6 hands.
Reindeer	United States	The ship was lost 100 nautical miles (190 km) north of Manila, Spanish East Indies. She was on a voyage from China to Boston, Massachusetts.
Rosebud	(United Kingdom of Great Britain and Ireland) Cape Colony	The schooner foundered whilst on a voyage from East London to Table Bay with the loss of all on board.
South Seamen	United States	The ship was wrecked in the Pacific Ocean.
Swiss Boy	Hudson's Bay Company	The brig was wrecked in Nitinet Sound. Her crew survived.
Termandito	Hudson's Bay Company	The barque was wrecked at the mouth of the Mackenzie River with the loss of 115 lives.
Tom King's Ship	United States	The ship was wrecked in the Pacific Ocean.
Tulloch Castle	United Kingdom	The ship was driven ashore and wrecked in Combermere Bay. She was on a voyage from Moulmein, Burma to Calcutta.
William & Mary	United Kingdom	The brigantine was driven ashore and wrecked at The Mumbles, Glamorgan. Her crew survived. She was on a voyage from Swansea, Glamorgan to Youghal, County Cork.
Yemassee	United States	The ship was lost in Loch Bharcasaig.
Young Greek	(United Kingdom of Great Britain and Ireland) New Zealand	The schooner was lost en route between Pōrangahau and Wellington in February or March.
