= USS Sachem (1861) =

Gunboat of the United States Navy

History

United States
- Name: USS Sachem
- Launched: 1844
- Acquired: by purchase, 20 September 1861
- Fate: Captured, 8 September 1863

General characteristics
- Type: Steam gunboat
- Displacement: 197 long tons (200 t)
- Length: 121 ft (37 m)
- Beam: 23 ft 6 in (7.16 m)
- Depth of hold: 7 ft 6 in (2.29 m)
- Propulsion: Steam engine
- Complement: 52
- Armament: 1 × 20-pounder Parrott rifle; 4 × 32-pounder guns

The second United States Navy vessel to bear the name, USS Sachem was a screw steamer built in 1844 at New York City, where the U.S. Navy purchased her on 20 September 1861.

== Service history ==
=== Battle of Hampton Roads ===
After towing service in New York Harbor where the Navy was buying vessels to blockade the coast of the Confederate States of America, USS Sachem, commanded by Acting Master Lemuel G. Crane, got underway on 6 March 1862, and with USS Currituck escorted the just-built ironclad monitor USS Monitor to Hampton Roads, Virginia. The three ships reached nearby Fort Monroe on the night of 8 March, the first day of the Battle of Hampton Roads. Sachem was present the next day during the Battle of Hampton Roads, Monitor's |historic engagement with the Confederate ironclad ram, CSS Virginia. The Confederates built the Virginia by using the raised hull and engines of the former USS Merrimack—which had been burned and scuttled by U.S. Navy forces as they retreated from the nearby Norfolk Navy Yard in Portsmouth, Virginia, when that facility was seized by the Confederacy early in the American Civil War.

=== Battle of Forts Jackson and St. Philip ===
On the 17th, Sachem was assigned to the United States Coast Survey and, with the assistant in charge, soon sailed for the Gulf of Mexico where Flag Officer Farragut was preparing to attack New Orleans. Sachem entered the Mississippi on 12 April; and, "...while exposed to fire from shot and shell, and from sharpshooters in the bushes," her boats surveyed the river from the passes to positions just below forts St. Philip and Jackson. They marked off the channel for Farragut's deep draft men-of-war and located firing positions for Comdr. David D. Porter's mortar schooners. Whenever riflemen in the underbrush along the river's marshy shores fired upon the surveying parties, a few rounds of canister from the Union warships would silence the musketry. However, at night, Confederates managed to undo much of the work of these brave engineers by moving their carefully located stakes and flags. But the triangulation continued; and, when Farragut moved his fleet up the river on the 15th, charts prepared by the Coast Survey guided each of Porter's vessels to a position from which it could fire accurately at one of the forts while suffering minimum exposure to enemy guns. On the morning of the 18th, when the schooners began bombarding the forts, each gunner knew to the yard the distance from his mortar to the target. In the days that followed, whenever a vessel changed its position, an officer of the Coast Survey would immediately calculate the new distance for her gunners, enabling them to resume their extremely accurate fire.

Sachem, meanwhile, was busy transporting the wounded to the hospital at Pilot Town, mapping the labyrinthine waterways in the vicinity, supplying pilots for military traffic on the river, and helping to refloat USS Miami after that gunboat had run aground.

Farragut, covered by an intense bombardment from Porter's schooners, had dashed through the obstructions across the river and past the forts on the night of 23–24 April. The outflanked riverine forts surrendered on the 28th.

=== Operations off the coast ===
Sachem, after supporting Farragut near New Orleans, arrived at Ship Island, Mississippi on 5 May, but got underway later that day to reconnoiter Lake Pontchartrain and the Pearl River. Then, on the 7th, she accompanied the steamers of the mortar flotilla to the bar off Mobile Bay to get information and lay buoys for a contemplated attack on that port. On the 8th, when the steamer USS Clifton ran aground on Southeast Shoal under the guns of Fort Morgan, Sachem, ignoring the Confederate fire, steamed in to help refloat the ship.

The appearance of the Union warships off Mobile Bay prompted Confederate forces to destroy and evacuate the navy yard at nearby Pensacola, Florida. Porter assisted Brigadier General Lewis G. Arnold in occupying and restoring the abandoned works which soon became a valuable Union naval base in the gulf.

Few records have been found to help trace Sachem's movements during the coming weeks. On 16 May, while writing to the Superintendent of the Coast Survey, Porter mentioned Sachem leading three steamers up the Pearl River seeking Confederate gunboats reported there. On the expedition, Mr. J. G. Oltmanns of the Coast Survey was severely wounded by a Confederate rifle ball. Sachem's guns quickly scattered the Southern sharpshooters. It is not clear whether this action occurred during Sachem's expedition up the Pearl which began on 5 May or took place during a later operation there. A late report states that men from Sachem were ashore above Natchez on the 25th, but nothing is known about their mission or about the operation of their ship at the time.

=== Operations off Texas ===
On the last day of June, Farragut ordered Capt. H. W. Morris, Senior Naval Officer at New Orleans, to man Sachem with officers and crew, so the Coast Survey probably returned her to the Navy there about this time. In the same dispatch, he also ordered Sachem to blockade Aransas Pass, Texas. Commanded by Acting Volunteer Lt. Amos Johnson, the gunboat served there as tender to bark USS Arthur late in July. On 12 August, she took an unidentified prize in Aransas Bay. Four days later, she and yacht USS Corypheus engaged a battery behind a levee. One shot struck the gunboat's side and wounded a petty officer before the Union ships silenced the Southern guns. The Confederate artillerymen later returned to their guns and resumed the duel which continued intermittently throughout the day. Two days later, Sachem, USS Reindeer, and Arthur supported a party from sloop USS Belle Italia, which landed near Corpus Christi, Texas to attack a battery. Fire from the ships enabled the beach party to beat off a counter attack by large bodies of infantry and cavalry. They held their beachhead on the shore until freely withdrawing late in the day after exhausting their ammunition. Sachem's commanding officer, Acting Master Amos Johnson, won high praise for his "courage and zeal" during the action.

On the night of 6 December, Sachem captured a small, unidentified schooner manned by three men and laden with salt. The prisoners told of an armed Confederate schooner which had left Corpus Christi to sound the channel at Corpus Christi Pass. Two boats from Sachem got under way the next morning to intercept the Southern ship. They caught sight of their quarry some 28 miles further and gave chase. After pursuing the schooner, Queen of the Bay, about 8 miles, the boats forced her ashore. The Confederates abandoned their ship and opened fire on the Union boats from the shore, killing three men and wounding three others including the commander of the boat party, Acting Ensign Alfred H. Reynolds. The Federal sailors then left their boats and retreated overland 30 miles to rejoin Sachem at Aransas Bay.

=== Battle of Galveston ===
Sachem, badly needing repairs, proceeded to Galveston where she arrived on 29 December. Two days later, before dawn on the first day of 1863, Confederate forces surprised the Union Navy ships in that port. During the struggle, Sachem and Corypheus vigorously supported the Union Army garrison which was under attack. USS Harriet Lane surrendered; and, after running aground, USS Westfield was destroyed to prevent capture. Sachem, under orders of Lt. Comdr. Law, senior surviving naval officer, ran through heavy artillery fire from the shore and escaped to sea. She reached New Orleans about midnight of 3–4 January.

=== Vicksburg Campaign ===
In need of overhaul before the action, Sachem was badly cut up during the fighting in Galveston Harbor and had one propeller shot away. But, some two months of repair work at New Orleans restored the gunboat to fighting trim. At that time, early March 1863, Admiral Farragut was preparing to push up the Mississippi once more to help tighten the stranglehold which Admiral David Dixon Porter and General Ulysses S. Grant were closing around Vicksburg. Once past the Confederate batteries at Port Hudson, he intended to blockade the mouth of the Red River to stop the flow of men and supplies from the west to Southern armies fighting east of the Mississippi.

While Farragut approached Port Hudson on 14 March, USS Essex, Sachem, and several mortar schooners were already in position below the forts. That afternoon, as the mortars began a slow bombardment of the lower riverside breastworks, Sachem steamed up close to Southern batteries tempting them to reveal the positions of their cannon; but the Confederate guns spurned the bait and remained hidden. As darkness fell, Farragut moved his assault forces, three steam sloops-of-war—each lashed to a gunboat—and side-wheeler, USS Mississippi, up to predetermined positions just out of range of Port Hudson's artillery. Shortly after ten, the warships, led by flagship, Hartford, and her consort, USS Albatross, got under way and stealthily steamed upstream. About an hour later, guns of the lower battery opened fire. Sachem, Essex, and the mortar schooners immediately replied. Their fire so hampered the gunners in the lower batteries that they did little damage to Farragut's flotilla as it raced up the river, guns ablazing, toward more deadly batteries beyond range of Sachem, Essex, and the mortar schooners. About an hour past midnight on the 15th, Comdr. Caldwell, in Essex, ordered Sachem to investigate a ship which had been sighted coming down stream. It proved to be USS Richmond being towed by USS Genesee after the steam sloop-of-war had been disabled and forced to retire from the action. Later, a boat came down and reported that Mississippi was aground and in trouble. While Sachem steamed to assist the distressed side wheeler, another boat appeared, rowing down, bringing Capt. Smith, Mississippi's commanding officer; Lt. George Dewey, the future hero of Manila Bay; and word that Mississippi had been abandoned. Sachem transferred the officers to Richmond and then headed back up river. She soon struck a raft, breaking it in two, fouling her propeller, and almost causing her to collide with Richmond. A few moments later, blazing Mississippi drifted into view and forced Sachem, to maneuver desperately to avoid entanglement with that doomed and dangerous derelict. Then, Sachem devoted the rest of the night to picking up stray survivors of the side wheeler. During the fighting, Sachem's only serious injury was a fracture in the barrel of her 20-pounder Parrot rifle. After supporting Farragut's attack on Port Hudson, Sachem was based at Baton Rouge, to help maintain Union control of the lower river.

In April, while proceeding to Berwick Bay, La., to replace USS Diana which had been captured there on 28 March, Sachem developed serious leaks which forced her to return to New Orleans. After repairs had been completed, the ship returned to Berwick Bay; ascended the Atchafalaya River, bypassing Port Hudson; and joined Farragut in sealing off the mouth of the Red River and in patrolling the Mississippi above Fort Hudson. This blockade stopped the flow of food and supplies to the Southern riverbank forts at Vicksburg and Port Hudson.

When Porter daringly raced his gunboats down the Mississippi past the batteries at Vicksburg, Admiral Farragut decided to leave the river and turn his attention back to the blockade of the gulf coast. On the morning of 8 May, he left his flagship, Hartford, and embarked on Sachem for passage back down the Atchafalaya to Brashear City, La., where he boarded a train for New Orleans. Sachem then returned by the back route to the Mississippi between Vicksburg and Port Hudson where she served as a dispatch vessel carrying messages and supplies between Army and Navy units besieging those two Southern river strongholds.

Early in July, the fall of those fortresses opened the entire Mississippi to Union shipping and freed Sachem for duty in the Berwick Bay–Atchafalaya area which occupied the gunboat during the summer.

=== Second Battle of Sabine Pass ===
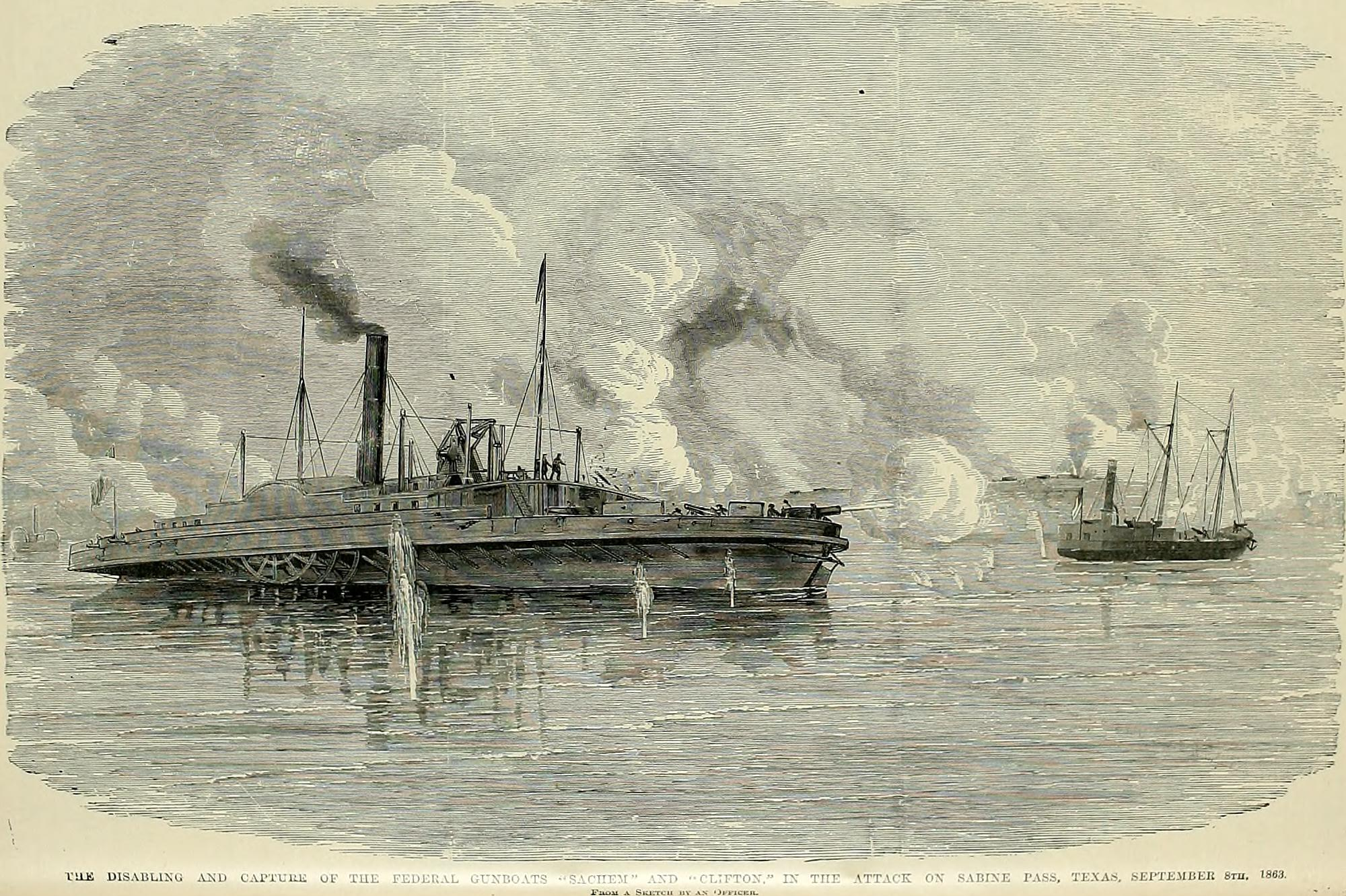
Sachem (right) is captured along with USS Clifton

Early in September, Sachem was assigned to a joint Army-Navy expeditionary force mounted at New Orleans to attack Sabine Pass, Texas. Possession of this port would close another important Confederate blockade running center and provide the Union with a base for a thrust into the interior of Texas. Sachem arrived off Sabine Pass on the evening of the 7th, followed USS Clifton across the bar and entered the harbor there the next day. That afternoon, Sachem, followed by USS Arizona, advanced up the Louisiana Channel while Clifton and USS Granite City moved forward along the Texas shore. Sachem and Clifton opened fire on the Confederate battery at Fort Griffin, but the Confederate guns remained silent until the Union gunboats were at close range. Then they countered with a devastating cannonade. A shot through her boiler totally disabled Sachem and another cut Clifton's wheel rope causing her to run aground under the Southern guns. Nevertheless, the damaged gunboats continued their struggle until heavy casualties forced Clifton to surrender. Arizona and Granite City then began to withdraw; so Lt. Johnson, with no possibility of saving his ship, ordered her Parrott gun spiked; her magazine flooded; and her signal book and spy glass destroyed. He then had her flag hauled down and a white flag hoisted.

Confederate cotton-clad steamer CSS Uncle Ben then pulled up to Sachem and towed the gunboat to Sabine City. On 17 October, Sachem sailed for Orange, Texas, and operated under the Texas Marine Department supporting the Confederate Army. In March 1864, Sachem was back at Sabine Pass; and, in April, was said to be commanded by a noted blockade runner of Galveston, John Davisson; was reportedly laden with cotton and awaiting a chance to slip through the blockade. However, no further record of her career has been found.

== See also ==
- Union Navy
- Union Blockade
