= USS Reindeer (1863) =

Gunboat of the United States Navy

History

United States
- Ordered: as Rachel Miller
- Laid down: date unknown
- Launched: 1863
- Acquired: 13 June 1863
- Commissioned: 25 July 1863
- Decommissioned: 7 August 1865
- In service: July 1863
- Stricken: 1865 (est.)
- Fate: Sold, 17 August 1865

General characteristics
- Displacement: 212 tons
- Length: 154 ft (47 m)
- Beam: 32 ft 9 in (9.98 m)
- Draft: 6 ft (1.8 m)
- Depth of hold: 5 ft (1.5 m)
- Propulsion: steam engine; stern wheel-propelled
- Speed: 8 knots
- Complement: not known
- Armament: six 24-pounder howitzers

USS Reindeer was a steamer purchased by the Union Navy during the American Civil War.

She was used by the Union Navy as a gunboat assigned to patrol Confederate waterways. Post-war she was converted into a dispatch vessel and served that function until finally decommissioned.

== Built in Cincinnati in 1863 ==
Reindeer, a wooden, stern-wheel gunboat (No. 35) built at Cincinnati, Ohio, in the spring of 1863 as Rachel Miller, was purchased by the Navy there on 13 June 1863 and placed in service early in July 1863.

== Civil War service ==
=== Assigned to the Mississippi Squadron ===
Reindeer joined the Mississippi Squadron just as Union Army and Navy efforts to open the entire Mississippi River system to Federal shipping finally reached fruition with the capture of the South's river strongholds at Vicksburg, Mississippi, and Port Hudson, Louisiana.

=== Opening of the Confederate waterways to Union Navy control ===
This achievement of Northern arms opened a new phase of the Civil War in the West. Control of the vast inland waterways, which meandered through the Confederacy, gave Union commanders strategic lines of supply and communication for campaigns which would pierce into the South's heartland to deprive the Confederacy of its centers of strength.

To counter this strategy, Southern generals attempted to deprive the North of the use of these vital rivers. Lacking a powerful naval arm to challenge Federal forces afloat, the South resorted to guerrilla raids and cavalry forays against Union bases along the riverbanks and on supply ships which plied the rivers bringing Mr. Lincoln's soldiers food, clothing, ammunition, and the other necessities of war.

=== Supporting the effort to suppress Morgan’s Raiders ===
It was Reindeer's job to protect Northern shipping from Southern raiders. After Confederate Brig. Gen. John H. Morgan crossed the Ohio River and invaded the North with some 2,500 troops early in July, Reindeer joined a group of Union gunboats which patrolled the river for 10 days to prevent his crossing back to the southern bank and escaping. Aided by Union troops under Major General Ambrose Burnside, they chased Morgan for almost 500 miles before they caught up with him at Buffington Island on the 19th and captured about half of the invading force.

=== Reindeer finally officially commissioned ===
The crisis passed, Reindeer returned to Cincinnati for a belated commissioning ceremony on 25 July 1863. She operated along the Ohio from Louisville, Kentucky, to Madison, Indiana, watchful against guerrilla batteries as she patrolled the river and escorted transports and supply ships.

=== Reassigned to Cumberland River operations ===
On 15 November, the gunboat was transferred to the Cumberland River for similar duty. In the months that followed, she frequently engaged Confederate batteries which fired upon her from temporary positions along the riverbanks as she reconnoitered the upper Cumberland and supported Army operations in Tennessee which would ultimately culminate in General William Tecumseh Sherman's death thrust through Georgia to the sea. She also participated in the Battle of Nashville December, 2nd, 4th and 15th, 1864.

On 11 April 1864, Reindeer became a dispatch vessel for the Navy base at Mound City, Illinois, and served in that capacity until she decommissioned on 7 August 1865.

== Post-war disposal and subsequent civilian career ==
She was sold at public auction on 17 August 1865 to J. A. Williamson, et al., and was redocumented as Mariner on 5 October 1865. The ship operated as a merchantman until she was stranded and destroyed at Decatur, Alabama, on 9 May 1867.

== See also ==
- Anaconda Plan
