= Pass Cavallo (Texas) =

Natural water inlet in Texas, United States

- Pass Cavalla
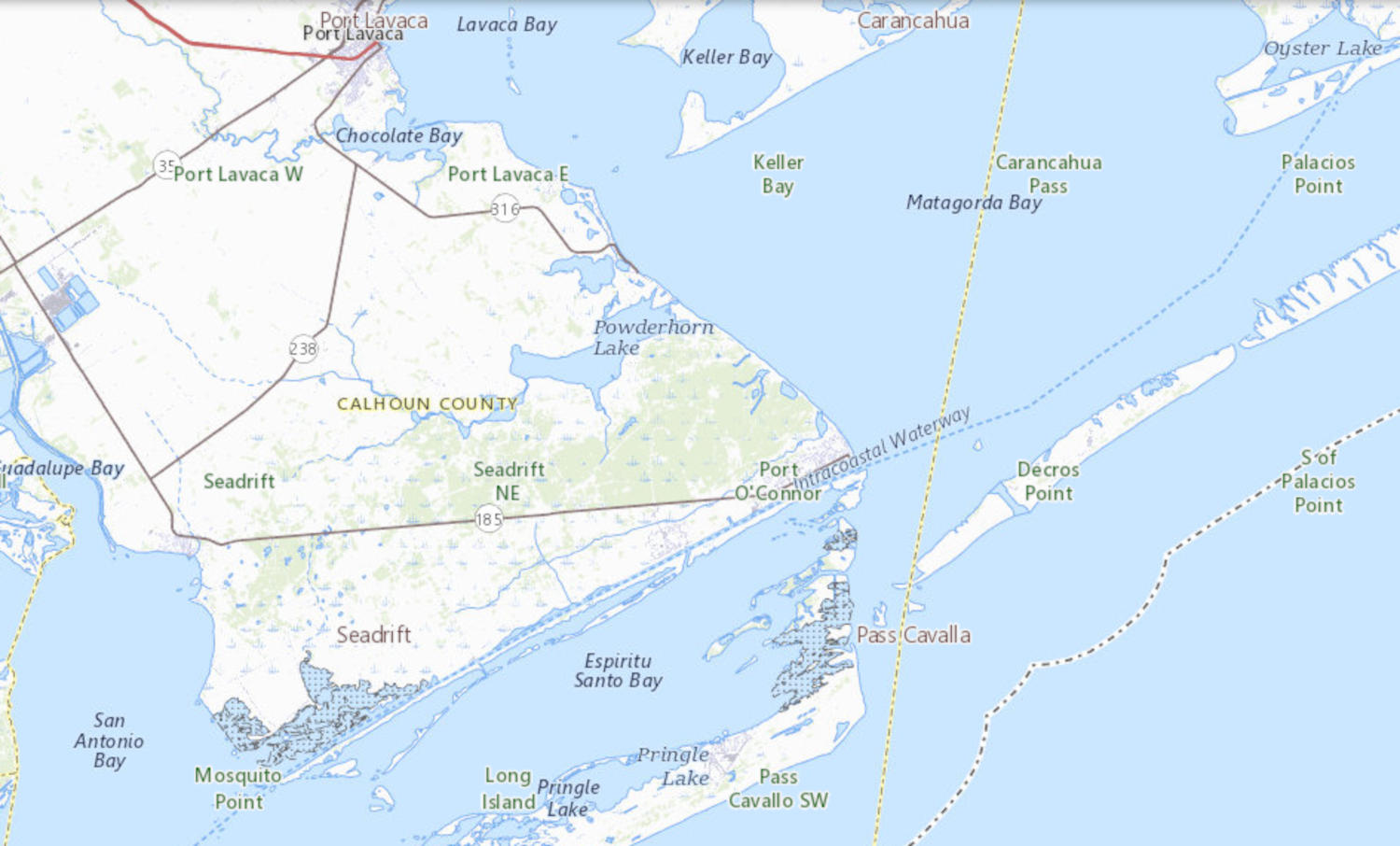
- Pass Cavallo channel to Matagorda Bay

- Location within Texas Location within the United States
- Location: Calhoun County, Texas; United States
- Coordinates: 28°23′05″N 96°23′02″W
- Part of: Matagorda Bay
- Primary outflows: Gulf of Mexico
- Managing agency: GNIS (feature ID 1343640 and 1343809)
- References: AOL. "Pass Cavallo, Texas" (Map). MapQuest. AOL.

Pass Cavallo, alternately known as Cavallo Pass, is one of five natural water inlets which separate the Gulf of Mexico and Matagorda Bay, in the U.S. state of Texas. Matagorda Island Lighthouse was originally built on this site. During the Civil War, Pass Cavallo was a major port of entry and was captured by the Union.

== French colonization of Texas ==
In 1684, René-Robert Cavelier, Sieur de La Salle came ashore on the Texas Gulf Coast at this point establishing the first French colony. In 1686, La Salle's illustrious barque ― La Belle ― navigated the barrier island waterway of the Pass Cavallo.

== Illustrations of Pass Cavallo ==
Pass Cavallo Channel to Matagorda Bay, Texas

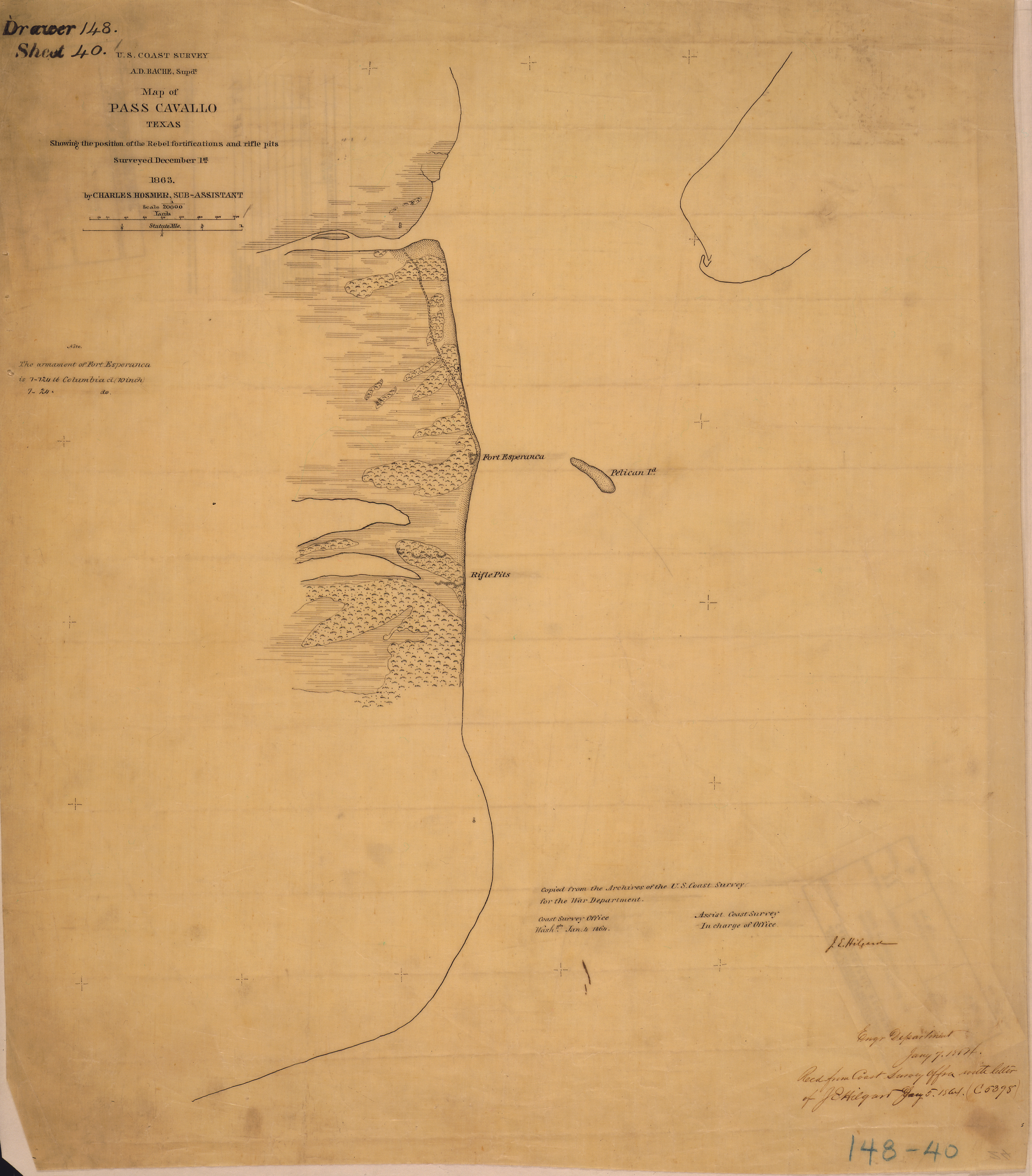
Pass Cavallo sketch depicts Texas rebel fortifications and rifle pits at Matagorda Bay, ca. 12/1863 - 01/1864

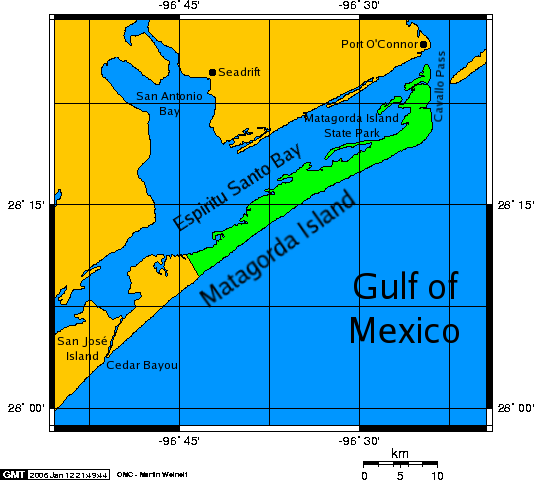
Matagorda Island with illustration of Pass Cavallo
