= USS Corypheus =

Gunboat of the United States Navy

History

United States
- Laid down: date unknown
- Launched: date unknown
- In service: 12 June 1862
- Out of service: 1865
- Stricken: 1865 (est.)
- Captured: by Union Navy forces; 13 May 1862
- Fate: Sold, 15 September 1865

General characteristics
- Displacement: 82 tons
- Length: not known
- Beam: not known
- Draught: not known
- Propulsion: sail
- Speed: varied
- Complement: 28
- Armament: one 30-pounder rifle; one 24-pounder howitzer

USS Corypheus was a schooner captured by the Union Navy during the American Civil War.

Corypheus was used by the Union Navy primarily as a gunboat to patrol navigable waterways of the Confederacy in order to prevent the South from trading with other countries. She carried a 30-pounder rifled gun, powerful enough to stop a blockade runner, and a howitzer for riverside bombardment.

== Captured by the Union Navy and placed into service ==
The Confederate yacht Corypheus was captured by USS Calhoun 13 May 1862 in Bayou Bonfuca, Louisiana. Taken by the Navy she was assigned to tender duty for the bark USS Arthur off Aransas Pass, Texas, 12 June 1862, commanded by Acting Master A. T. Spear.

== Civil War service ==
=== Assigned to the Gulf Blockade ===
Operating off Corpus Christi, Texas, on 12 August 1862 Corypheus participated in the capture of the armed schooner Breaker and destruction of Hannah and Elma by their own men. She took part in the engagements at Corpus Christi on 16 and 18 August, and while returning to Aransas Bay, captured the blockade runner Water Witch.

=== Participating in the Battle of Galveston ===
Arriving at Galveston, Texas, 28 December 1862, Corypheus fired in the Battle of Galveston on 1 January 1863. Corypheus fought valiantly and cleared amid a rain of fire from the enemy when the Union force withdrew. Admiral David G. Farragut wrote of her officers and crew that they acted with uncommon coolness and great courage, keeping up their fire for the protection of the soldiers on shore, and, when ordered to abandon their vessel, preserved and safely extricated their ship although left entirely by themselves except for USS Sachem.

=== Lake Pontchartrain assignment ===
Her next duty was on Lake Pontchartrain where she was stationed to break up the small-craft traffic crossing between New Orleans, Louisiana, and coastal waters. She remained on this duty until November 1864 when ordered to Pensacola, Florida. Following repairs, she was stationed around Mobile, Alabama.

== Post war decommissioning and sale ==
After the war's end, Corypheus was sold 15 September 1865.
