= Roanoke Island order of battle =

The following lists the organization of the Union and Confederate forces engaged at the Battle of Roanoke Island, during the American Civil War on February 7–8, 1862.

== Union ==
=== Union Army ===
Coast Division (Brig. Gen. Ambrose E. Burnside)

First Brigade (Brig. Gen. John G. Foster) K-19 W-113 M-0 =132

10th Connecticut - Col Charles L. Russell
23rd Massachusetts - Col John Krutz
24th Massachusetts - Col Thomas G. Stevenson
25th Massachusetts - Col Edwin M. Upton
27th Massachusetts - Col Horace C. Lee

Second Brigade (Brig. Gen. Jesse L. Reno) K-15 W-79 M-13 =107

21st Massachusetts - Ltc Alberto R. Maggi
9th New Jersey - Ltc Charles A. Heckman
51st New York - Col Edward Ferrero
51st Pennsylvania - Col John F. Hartranft

Third Brigade (Brig. Gen. John G. Parke) K-0 W-17 M-0 =17

8th Connecticut - Col Edward Harland (general)
11th Connecticut - Col Henry W. Kingsbury (regiment not engaged)
9th New York - Col Rush C. Hawkins
4th Rhode Island - Col Isaac P. Rodman
5th Rhode Island, detachment - Maj John Wright

Unassigned units:

1st New York Marine Artillery (detachment) - Col William A. Howard
99th New York (Union Coast Guard) - Lt Charles W. Tillotson

Army gunboats:

Picket
Vidette
Hussar
Lancer
Ranger
Chasseur
Pioneer
Sentinel

=== Union Navy ===
North Atlantic Blockading Squadron (Flag Officer Louis M. Goldsborough)

Image	Ship Name	Commanding Officer	Notes
USS Philadelphia	USS Philadelphia		Squadron Flagship, "being unfit for the purpose took no part in the engagement"
USS Southfield	USS Southfield	Acting Volunteer Lieutenant C. F. W. Behm	Flag Officer Goldsborough embarked
USS Delaware	USS Delaware	Lieutenant S. P. Quackenbush	Commander S. C. Rowan, division commander
—	USS Stars and Stripes	Lieutenant Reed Werden	
USS Louisiana	USS Louisiana	Lieutenant A. Murray	
USS Hetzel	USS Hetzel	Lieutenant H. K. Davenport	
—	USS Underwriter	Lieutenant W. N. Jeffers	
USS Commodore Perry	USS Commodore Perry	Lieutenant C. W. Flusser	
—	USS Valley City	Lieutenant J. C. Chaplin	
USS Commodore Barney	USS Commodore Barney	Acting Volunteer Lieutenant R. T. Renshaw	
USS Hunchback	USS Hunchback	Acting Volunteer Lieutenant E. R. Colhoun	
—	USS Morse	Acting Master Peter Hayes	
—	USS Whitehead	Acting Master Charles French	
—	USS John L. Lockwood	Acting Master G. W. Graves	
—	USS Henry Brinker	Acting Master John E. Giddings	
—	USS Isaac N. Seymour	Acting Master F. S. Wells	
USS Ceres	USS Ceres	Acting Master John McDiarmid	
USS Satellite	USS General Putnam	Acting Master W. J. Hotchkiss	
—	USS Shawsheen	Acting Master T. G. Woodward	
—	USS Granite	Acting Master's Mate E. Boomer	

== Confederate ==
=== Confederate Army ===
Dist. of Roanoke — Brig. Gen. Henry A. Wise (not present in battle; ill)

Col. Henry M. Shaw, second in command

2nd North Carolina Battalion
8th North Carolina
17th North Carolina (3 companies)
31st North Carolina
46th Virginia
59th Virginia

(The Virginia regiments were part of the Wise Legion)

=== Confederate Navy ===
"Mosquito Fleet" (Flag Officer William F. Lynch)

CSS Sea-Bird (flagship)
CSS Curlew (sunk)
CSS Ellis
CSS Beaufort
CSS Raleigh
CSS Fanny
CSS Forrest
CSS Appomattox (not at Battle of Roanoke Island)
CSS Black Warrior (schooner)
