= Battle of Elizabeth City =

1862 battle of the American Civil War in North Carolina

Coordinates: 36.2742°N 76.1421°W

- Part of the American Civil War
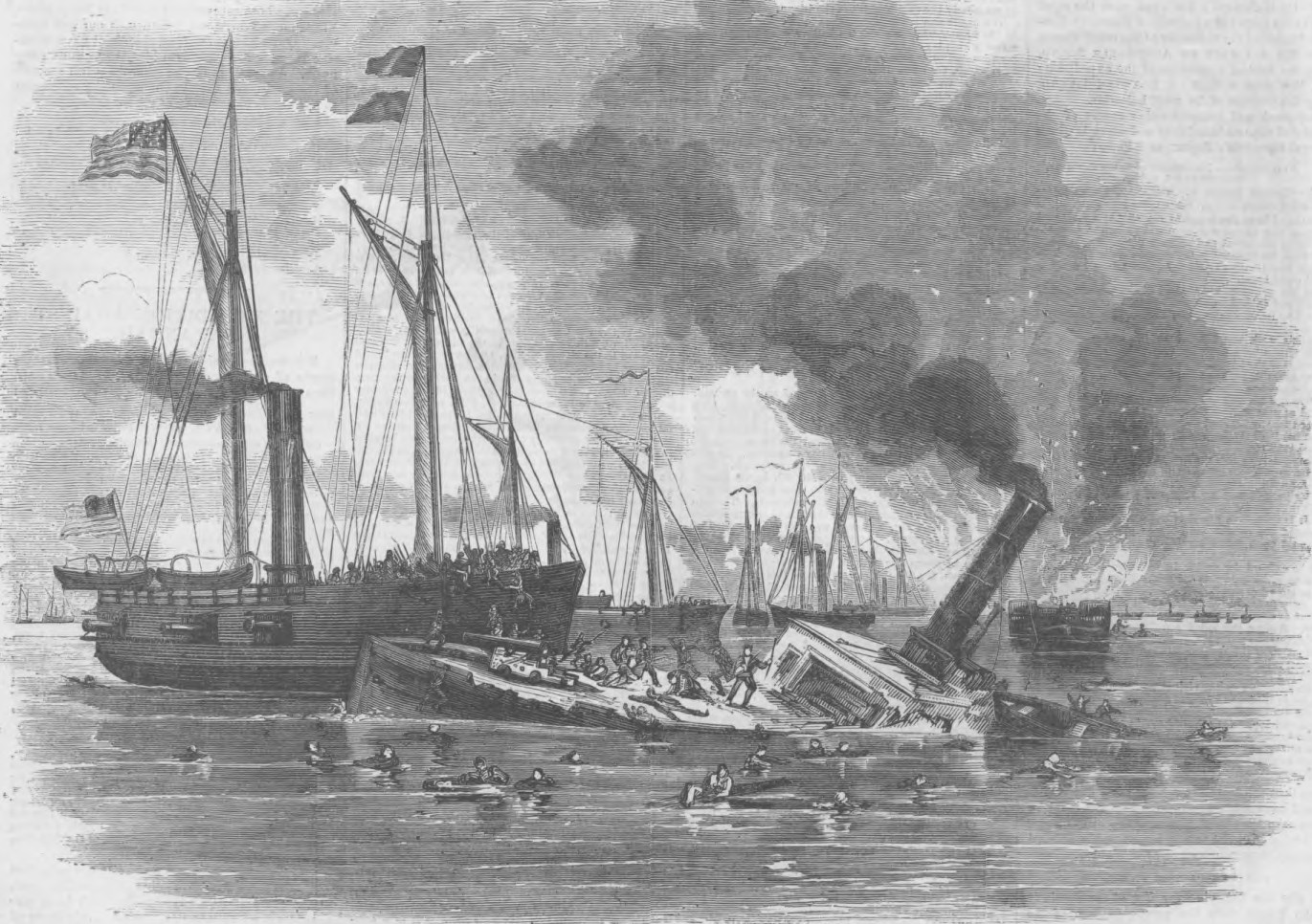
- Destruction of the Mosquito Fleet
Date	10 February 1862
Location	Camden County / Pasquotank County, near Elizabeth City, North Carolina
Result	Union victory

Belligerents
United States	Confederate States

Commanders and leaders
(United States Navy) Stephen C. Rowan	(Confederate States of America) William F. Lynch

Strength
13 gunboats	Land: ~34 men 4 artillery pieces Sea: 5 gunboats 1 schooner

Casualties and losses
2 steamers damaged 2 killed 7 wounded	1 steamer sunk 1 armed tug captured 1 steamer scuttled 1 armed tug scuttled 1 schooner scuttled 5 killed 7 wounded 34 captured

The Battle of Elizabeth City of the American Civil War was fought in the immediate aftermath of the Battle of Roanoke Island. It took place on 10 February 1862, on the Pasquotank River near Elizabeth City, North Carolina. The participants were vessels of the U.S. Navy's North Atlantic Blockading Squadron, opposed by vessels of the Confederate Navy's Mosquito Fleet; the latter were supported by a shore-based battery of four guns at Cobb's Point (now called Cobb Point), near the southeastern border of the town. The battle was a part of the campaign in North Carolina that was led by Major General Ambrose E. Burnside and known as the Burnside Expedition. The result was a Union victory, with Elizabeth City and its nearby waters in their possession, and the Confederate fleet captured, sunk, or dispersed.

== Background ==
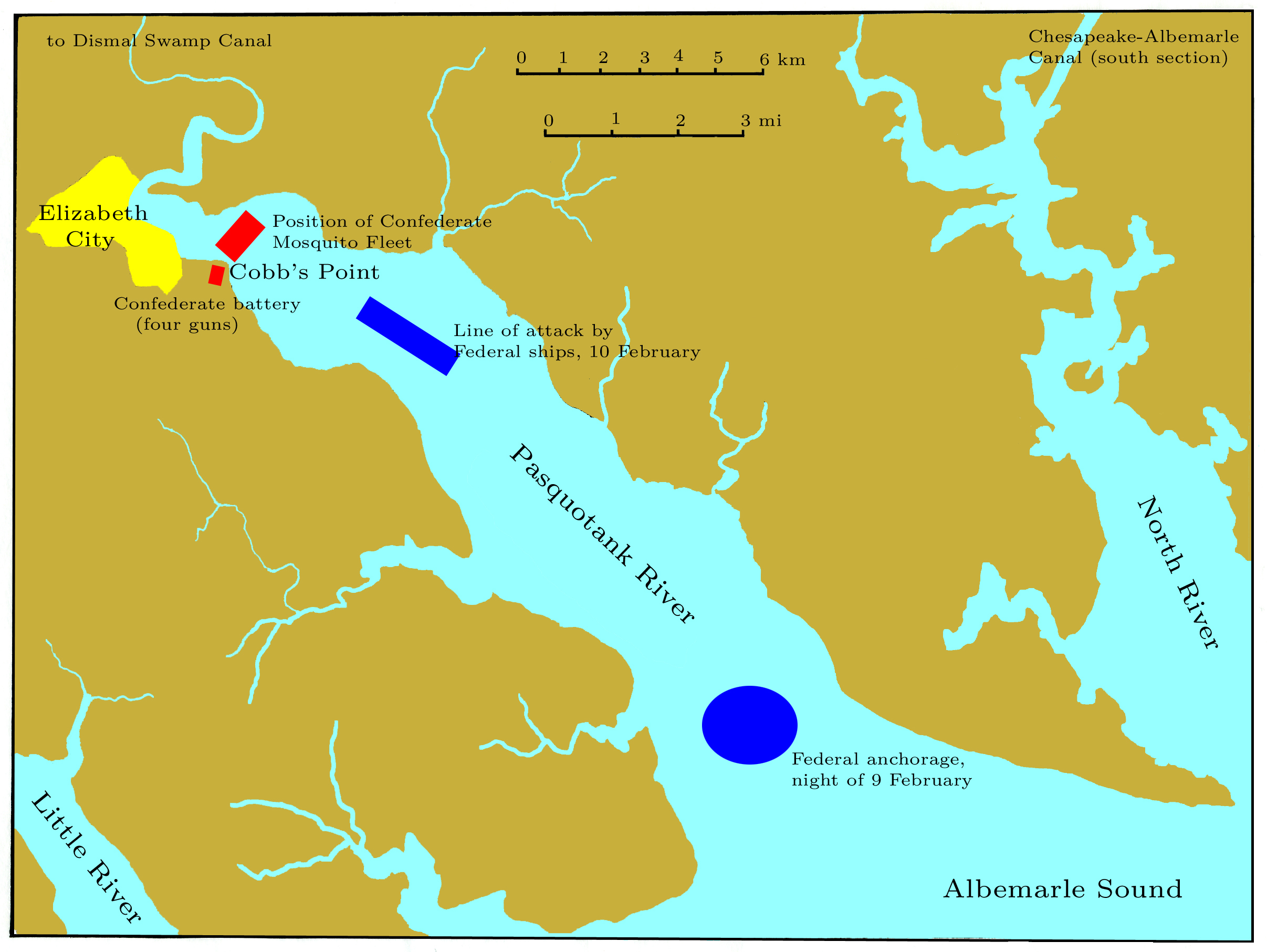
The Pasquotank River near Elizabeth City, site of battle of 10 February 1862

At the outset of the American Civil War, the Union sought to implement its Anaconda Plan to isolate and defeat the Confederacy. The crucial first step was to blockade the Confederate coast to prevent access to Europe; this was relatively easy, as the pre-war navy was almost entirely from the Union states. The Union then sought to use its naval advantage to advance the rest of the Anaconda Plan by cutting parts of the Confederacy off from one another.

Elizabeth City lies near the mouth of the Pasquotank River, where it flows into Albemarle Sound from the north. North of the city is the Dismal Swamp Canal. To the east is the southern segment of the Albemarle and Chesapeake Canal, separated from the Pasquotank River by only a narrow neck of land. (Note: The Dismal Swamp Canal begins a little less than 9 mi (14 km) from Cobb's Point as the crow flies, but almost twice that measured along the river. From Cobb's Point to the Albemarle and Chesapeake Canal is 12 mi (19 km) in a straight line, almost three times that by water.) Much of the food and forage delivered from North Carolina to southeastern Virginia was transported along these two canals. In particular, Norfolk, Virginia depended upon continued access to the canals for its subsistence. So long as the North Carolina Sounds remained in Confederate hands, Norfolk could be well supplied despite the blockading efforts of the Union Navy at the mouth of the Chesapeake Bay.

That changed, however, in early February 1862. In a battle fought on 7–8 February, the joint operation of a Union Army division under Major General Ambrose E. Burnside and a naval flotilla under Flag Officer Louis M. Goldsborough captured Roanoke Island, a position in Croatan Sound that had previously shielded the sounds from Federal encroachment. Earlier, Union ships trying to enforce the blockade on the canals would have had to enter Pamlico Sound through Hatteras Inlet, then pass several Confederate batteries on Roanoke Island before they could get into Albemarle Sound. With the elimination of the batteries, however, all that stood in the way of the Union Navy was the Mosquito Fleet of the Confederate States Navy.

== Prelude ==
=== Defense: the Mosquito Fleet ===
The first shots of the Burnside Expedition were fired on 7 February 1862, in the Battle of Roanoke Island. On that first day of the two-day battle, a force of 19 Union gunboats bombarded, rather inconclusively, four Rebel forts facing Croatan Sound and eight ships of the Confederate States Navy. The Federal ships were parts of the North Atlantic Blockading Squadron, commanded by Flag Officer Goldsborough. The Confederate vessels were drawn from a unit led by Flag Officer William F. Lynch, termed the Mosquito Fleet, intended to serve on Albemarle Sound and nearby waters. Two vessels of the Mosquito Fleet were not present: CSS Appomattox had been sent away to Edenton for supplies and did not return in time for the battle, and schooner CSS Black Warrior was left out, presumably because she lacked the mobility that steam power gave the rest of the fleet.

The gunnery duel lasted from noon until sunset. The only significant casualty among the fleets was the loss of CSS Curlew, holed at the waterline and beached to avoid sinking; when Roanoke Island was surrendered the next day, she was burned in order to keep her out of Federal hands. One other ship was damaged, but not by enemy action: CSS Forrest damaged her screw by running on a submerged obstacle, and was thereafter unable to move under her own power. The remainder of the Mosquito Fleet suffered only minimal damage. They had to retire at the end of the day, with Forrest in tow, solely because they had nearly run out of ammunition.

Flag Officer Lynch took his fleet to Elizabeth City, to resupply and to repair Forrest. Failing to find ammunition to replenish his magazines, he sent Commander Thomas T. Hunter, former captain of CSS Curlew, to Norfolk. He later sent CSS Raleigh up the Dismal Swamp Canal for the same purpose. Hunter returned with enough to resupply only two ships; Lynch divided it among all of his remaining serviceable ships. Raleigh, however, was not able to return in time. On February 9, the Sea Bird and Appomattox were dispatched to rescue Confederate artillerymen at the Croatan Floating Battery opposite Roanoke Island but turned away when they spotted the federal flotilla. Lynch concluded that the flotilla would soon advance upon Elizabeth City and began to prepare for battle.

No further changes of status affected the Mosquito Fleet. On the eve of battle, Lynch had at his disposal six ships in the water, each with only enough shot and powder to be able to fire ten times. His flagship, Sea Bird, carrying two guns, was a converted sidewheel steamer. Three of his other vessels were former tugs: Appomattox and Ellis, each with two guns, and Beaufort, with only one. Fanny, with two guns, had been a transport vessel used by the United States Army until she was captured by Confederate forces near Cape Hatteras. The last vessel, CSS Black Warrior, a schooner that had been pressed into service only four days before the battle, was armed with two 32-pounder guns. In addition to the eleven guns of his fleet, Lynch counted on the four guns of the Cobb's Point battery for support.

=== Offense: the Union fleet ===
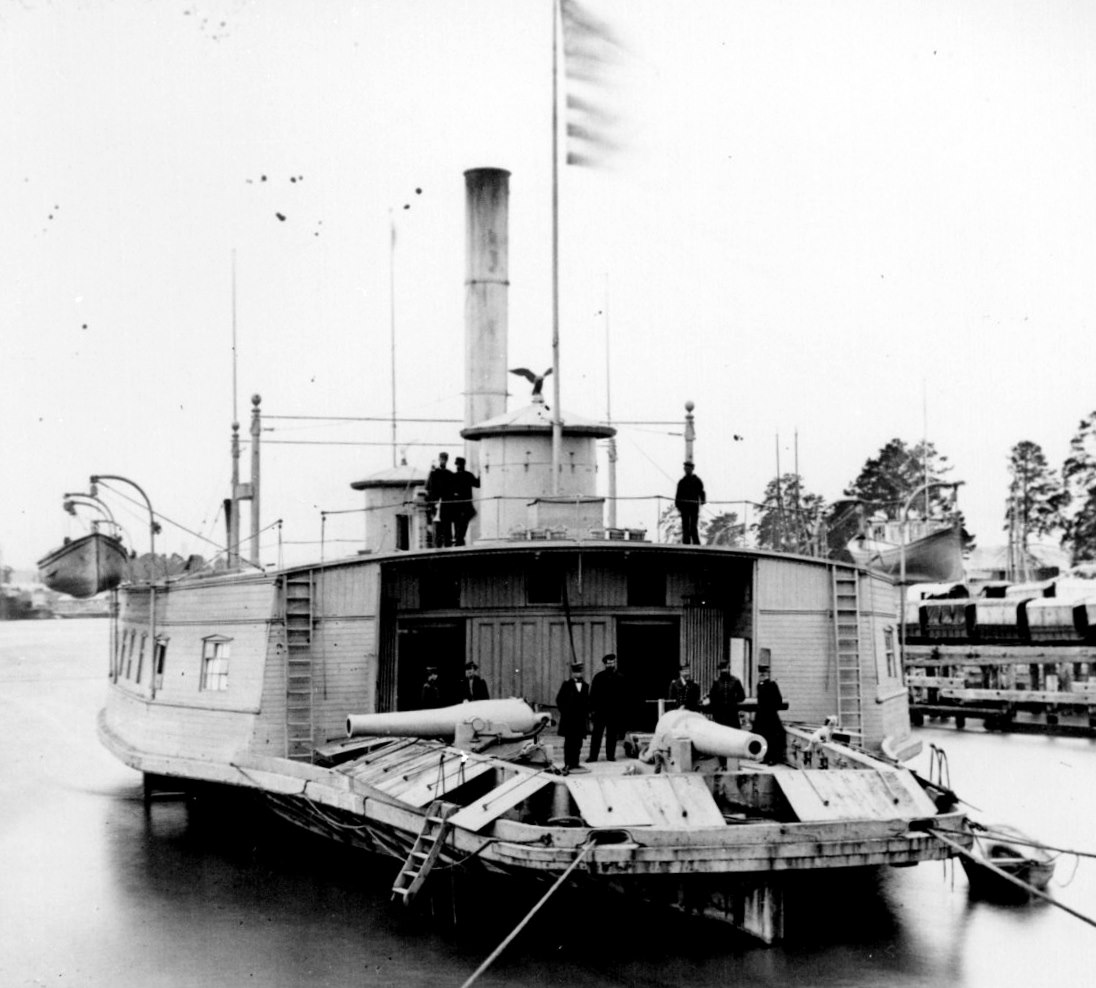
USS Commodore Perry's guns, 1864

The surrender of Roanoke Island on 8 February included all the Rebel forts that had faced on Croatan Sound, so they would no longer be able to prevent passage of Union ships from Pamlico into Albemarle Sound. Flag Officer Goldsborough therefore ordered his gunboats to pursue the Mosquito Fleet and destroy it. Although none of his vessels had been seriously hit in the bombardment of the preceding day, some were damaged enough that he decided not to include them in his order. Fourteen ships remained, however, and they carried a total of 37 guns. Goldsborough himself did not accompany the pursuit; in his stead was Commander Stephen C. Rowan. The fourteen were all, like their Confederate counterparts, converted from civilian vessels in the first days of the war. Rowan's flagship Delaware, Hetzel, Isaac N. Seymour, John L. Lockwood, Ceres, and General Putnam (Note: Because of engine trouble, General Putnam was not able to take part in the battle.) had all been sidewheel steamers before being acquired by the navy. Shawsheen was also a sidewheel steamer, and like two of her opponents was a former tug. Two other sidewheel vessels, Commodore Perry and Morse, had been ferries. The remaining five ships, Louisiana, Underwriter, Valley City, Whitehead, and Henry Brinker were screw steamers.

On 9 February, Rowan's gunboats anchored for the night 10 miles south of Cobb's Point in the Pasquotank River. A conference was held aboard Rowan's flagship during which it was explained that due to limited munitions, the ships could not afford to conduct a significant bombardment of the Confederate fort. Rowan ordered the captains in his flotilla to conserve their ammunition by ramming and boarding the enemy vessels.

== Battle ==
CSS Ellis after her capture

Lynch used the time that the Union flotilla was anchored to arrange his own ships for the coming battle. He decided to base his position on the battery of four guns at Cobb's Point, placing schooner CSS Black Warrior opposite the point, and his five remaining steamships in line across the river a short distance upstream. He took this position because he expected the Union to try to reduce the battery before proceeding, as they had done three days previously in the opening phase of the Battle of Roanoke Island. His final instructions to his captains included the order not to let the ships fall into enemy hands; if all else failed, they should try to escape, or else destroy their vessels. Black laborers were brought in to improve the defenses at Cobb's Point. Lynch also appealed to Colonel Charles Frederick Henningsen, who had recently arrived in the area with a small detachment, for assistance. With some difficulty, Henningsen was able to convince local authorities to call out the local militia into service, though only a few men responded to the appeal.

Shortly after dawn on February 10, Confederate lookouts spotted the Union flotilla advancing up the Pasquotank River. Upon hearing this, Lynch elected to land and make a final inspection of the defenses at Cobb's Point. He found it manned by only seven militiamen and a single civilian. Because the battery was the strong point of his planned defense, Lynch decided to command the battle from there and instructed Lieutenant Commander William Harwar Parker, captain of CSS Beaufort, to come ashore with his ammunition, officers, and most of his crew to man the guns. He left only enough on the ship to take her up the canal. With the additional men, only three of the four guns could be manned. When battle was joined, the militiamen promptly deserted; henceforth, only two guns could be used against the enemy.

Once the federal flotilla came within the limits of their range, the Cobb's Point battery and the Black Warrior opened fire, causing little or no damage. Once the ships were within three quarters of a mile, Rowan signaled for them to "dash the enemy" and they began returning fire. They disabled the Black Warrior, and in response the ship's crew set their vessel ablaze and jumped overboard. The militiamen at Cobb's Point then deserted, leaving only enough Confederates to operate two guns. Once the Federal flotilla had passed upstream, the guns could not be brought to bear and Parker ordered his men to spike them. Lynch observed the rest of the battle in silence as the Union ships destroyed his fleet.

The Commodore Perry rammed the CSS Sea Bird and in the process let loose its anchor, which became entangled in its adversary. After about 10 minutes Lieutenant Charles W. Flusser of the Perry was able to get his men to untangle the vessels, and the Sea Bird eventually sunk. Sailors from the Ceres boarded CSS Ellis. In response, the Ellis' commander, Lieutenant James W. Cooke ordered his crew to abandon ship while he challenged the federals with his cutlass. In the ensuing conflict, Cooke was wounded and captured. Fanny, having been set on fire, was run aground and abandoned by its crew.

During the battle, a Confederate shell exploded on the berth deck of the Valley City, rupturing several bulkheads and setting the deck ablaze. The fire was eventually extinguished.

CSS Beaufort and Appomattox made good their escape into the Dismal Swamp Canal. There, Appomattox was found to be 2 in (5.1 cm) too wide to pass through a lock, so she was burned. CSS Forrest, on the stocks to repair the damaged screw she had sustained on 8 February, was burned, along with an unnamed and uncompleted gunboat. CSS Raleigh was still at Norfolk, so she was not harmed. She and Beaufort were the only vessels in the Mosquito Fleet to escape either capture or destruction.

Following the defeat of the Mosquito Fleet, Rowan ordered his ships to proceed to Elizabeth City. Many local inhabitants, including members of the regional militia, fled the city. The landing federal sailors found two city blocks and a handful of outlying buildings in flames. Colonel Henningsen later recounted that he had ordered a sergeant, "with a detail, to aid the citizens in destroying the place by fire, as I had been requested to do so by some of the most prominent of them." The sailors, after pushing past a crowd of celebratory blacks at the city's wharves, searched the town for Confederates and put out the fires. Owing to the flight of Confederate troops, there was no fighting in the city.

== Aftermath ==
Casualties from the battle were modest. The attacking Federal fleet lost two men killed and seven wounded, while the Rebels lost in all four killed, six wounded, and 34 captured.

Quarter Gunner John Davis was awarded the Congressional Medal of Honor for his actions on board the Valley City during the engagement.

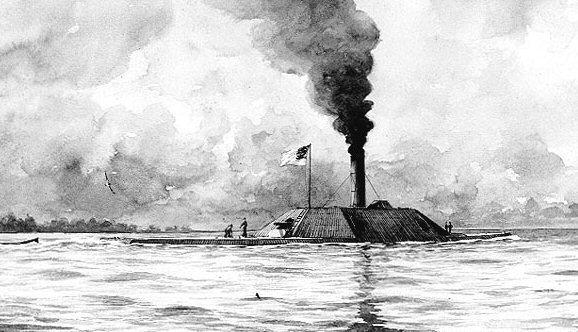
CSS Albemarle

The Albemarle and Chesapeake Canal was blocked near its entrance at the North River. The retreating Rebels started the obstruction. It was completed by the victorious Federal forces, acting under the orders of Flag Officer Goldsborough. The town of Edenton was taken without bloodshed on 12 February by four of Commander Rowan's gunboats. Two schooners were captured and another destroyed, and eight cannon were seized. More generally, there was no longer a Confederate presence on Albemarle Sound. It remained so for most of the rest of the war; the only significant challenge to Union dominance was the short-lived experiment of CSS Albemarle.

Although Norfolk was not attacked, it was isolated and increasingly worthless to the Confederate Army. In May, the city was abandoned.

== Order of battle ==
Confederate:
CSS Sea Bird, sidewheel steamer, flagship
CSS Fanny, tug boat
CSS Appomattox, tug boat
CSS Ellis, tug boat
CSS Beaufort, tug boat
CSS Black Warrior, schooner

Union:
USS Delaware, sidewheel steamer, flagship
USS Hetzel, sidewheel steamer
USS Isaac N. Seymour, sidewheel steamer
USS John L. Lockwood, sidewheel steamer
USS Ceres, sidewheel steamer
USS Shawsheen, sidewheel steamer
USS Commodore Perry, sidewheel steamer
USS Morse, sidewheel steamer
USS Louisiana, screw steamer
USS Underwriter, screw steamer
USS Valley City, screw steamer
USS Whitehead, screw steamer
USS Henry Brinker, screw steamer

== Works cited ==
- Barrett, John G. (1963). The Civil War in North Carolina. Chapel Hill: The University of North Carolina Press. ISBN 0-8078-0874-1.
- Browning, Robert M. Jr. (1993). From Cape Charles to Cape Fear: the North Atlantic Blockading Squadron during the Civil War. Tuscaloosa: University of Alabama. ISBN 0-8173-5019-5.
- Campbell, R. Thomas (2005). Storm over Carolina: the Confederate Navy's struggle for eastern North Carolina. Nashville: Cumberland House. ISBN 1-58182-486-6.
- Trotter, William R. (1989). Ironclads and Columbiads: the Civil War in North Carolina: The Coast. Winston-Salem: John F. Blair. ISBN 0-89587-088-6.
- US Navy Department, Official records of the Union and Confederate Navies in the War of the Rebellion. Series I: 27 volumes. Series II: 3 volumes. Washington: Government Printing Office, 1894–1922.
- US War Department, A compilation of the official records of the Union and Confederate Armies. Series I: 53 volumes. Series II: 8 volumes. Series III: 5 volumes. Series IV: 4 volumes. Washington: Government Printing Office, 1886–1901.
