= CSS Appomattox =

Confederate States Navy steam gunboat

Appomattox
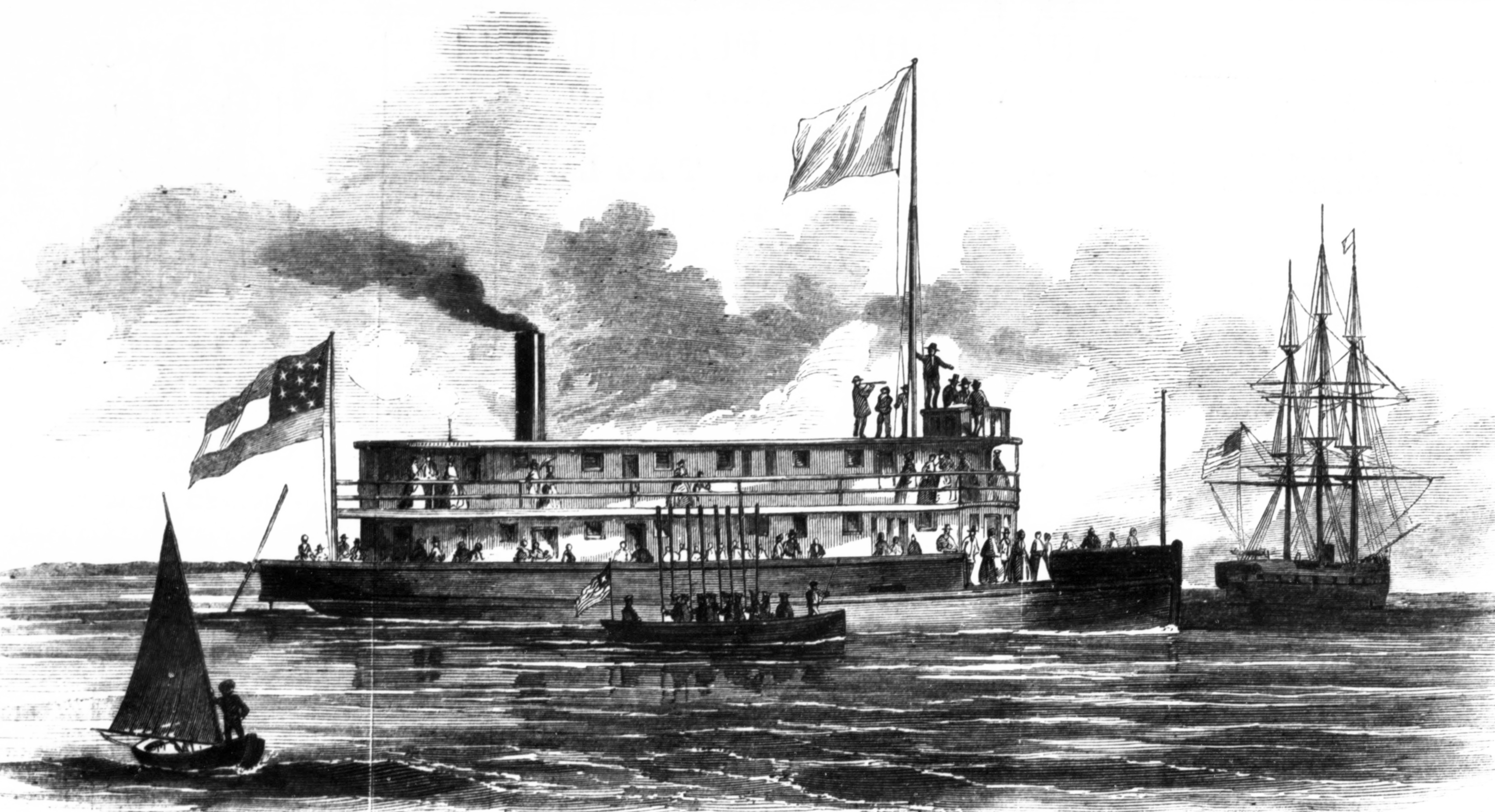
- Empire, the future CSS Appomattox, arriving at Fort Monroe under a flag of truce, 1861

History
- Name: Empire (1850); CSS Empire (1861); CSS Appomattox (1861)
- Owner: Merchants and People's Line (1850–1851); Ericsson Line (1851–1856?); Unknown (1857–1859); James River Transportation Line (1860); Cumberland Coal & Iron Co. (1860–61); Provisional Navy of Virginia (1861); Confederate States Navy (1861–1862)
- Operator: See owners
- Port of registry: Philadelphia (1850)
- Route: Baltimore–Philadelphia (1850–1856); Unknown (1857–1859); Richmond, Virginia–Norfolk, Virginia (1860)
- Builder: William Cramp (Kensington, Pennsylvania)
- Laid down: March 1850
- Launched: June 22, 1850
- Completed: October 1850
- Acquired: June 1861 (by CSN)
- Commissioned: Norfolk, 1861 (by CSN)
- Maiden voyage: October 19, 1850
- In service: 1850–1862
- Refit: 1861, as gunboat
- Home port: Baltimore (1850)
- Fate: Burned to avoid capture, February 10, 1862

General characteristics
- Type: Passenger steamboat and towboat (1850–61); Gunboat (1861–62)
- Tonnage: 120 tons burthen
- Length: 86 ft (26 m)
- Beam: 20 ft (6.1 m)
- Draft: 7 ft 6 in (2.29 m)
- Installed power: Steam engine
- Propulsion: Single screw
- Armament: (CSN): 1 bow 32-pounder gun, 1 stern howitzer

CSS Appomattox was a small screw-steam gunboat used early in the American Civil War by the Confederate States Navy to patrol the sounds of northeastern North Carolina.

Appomattox was originally Empire, a passenger steamboat built in Philadelphia in 1850 for commercial service. Between 1850 and 1856, the steamer ran in regular service between Baltimore and Philadelphia. Later, she ran as a towboat in Virginia waters.

Empire was acquired by the Provisional Navy of Virginia shortly after the outbreak of the Civil War and used as a transport and flag-of-truce boat, before being handed over to the newly-formed Confederate States Navy, becoming the gunboat CSS Empire. She was later renamed CSS Appomattox.

After participating in several engagements leading up to the Battle of Roanoke Island, she was burned to prevent capture after the Battle of Elizabeth City on February 10, 1862.

== Construction and characteristics ==
Empire, a wooden-hulled, screw-propelled (Note: Lytle & Holdcamper list Empire as a sidewheeler, an error echoed by some later sources. Numerous sources contemporaneous with the steamer confirm that she was screw-propelled, including Confederate Captain William H. Parker, who was personally acquainted with the vessel, as does the only known illustration of the vessel, by an artist from Frank Leslie's Illustrated Newspaper on location at Fort Monroe in 1861.) steamboat, was built in Kensington, Philadelphia, by William Cramp in 1850 for the Merchants and People's Transportation Company of Baltimore. Her engines and machinery were built by Reaney, Neafie & Co., also of Kensington. The steamer was laid down in March, launched on June 22 and completed in October.

Empire had a length of 86 feet (26 m), a beam of 20 ft (6.1 m), draft of 7 feet 6 inches (2.29 m) and a tonnage of 120 tons burthen. According to a contemporaneous report in The Baltimore Sun, the steamer was fitted with "roomy" passenger cabins and a private ladies saloon "fitted up with every accommodation".

== Merchant service ==
Empire completed a satisfactory trial trip on Friday, October 18, 1850. The following day, she joined the other steamers of the Merchants and People's Line in maintaining a daily service from the company's wharf on Light Street, Baltimore, to Philadelphia via the Chesapeake & Delaware Canal. A one-way ticket on steamers of the Line at this time could be had for a reportedly very competitive 25 cents (equivalent to $10 in 2025). In addition to carrying passengers, Empire, as with other steamers of the Line, also towed freight barges in this service. The Merchants and People's Line appears to have sold out to a competitor, the Ericsson Line, in 1851, (Note: According to a report in The Baltimore Sun.) but regardless of the change in ownership, Empire would continue operating between Baltimore and Philadelphia until 1856, with the exception of a brief period in the latter year when she ran between Philadelphia and the farming district of Wilmer's Point, Maryland. (Note: Wilmer's Point was a locality in Kent County, Maryland, on the Sassafras River, about halfway between the head of the river and Georgetown, known in the 1850s for its farm produce.)

By 1860, Empire was in service with the James River Transportation Line, towing freight barges between Richmond and Norfolk, Virginia, linking up at the latter port with the Cromwell Line bound for New York and Boston. Later that year, she was acquired by the Cumberland Coal & Iron Company of Virginia and operated as a canal, towing and transportation steamer. (Note: The Cumberland Company also appears to have acquired the James River Line's barges Alpha, Henrietta and Sun at the same time.) In the fall of 1860, she was fitted with a new boiler and her machinery given an overhaul.

As a result of legal action against her owners, Empire was put up for auction at Norfolk in March 1861. Shortly thereafter, she came into the hands of the newly-established Provisional Navy of Virginia for service in the American Civil War, which had broken out in April.

== Confederate service ==
=== Early service, April–June 1861 ===
After being acquired by the Provisional Navy, Empire was used in late April 1861 to tow a barge loaded with six Paixhans guns and 1,200 rounds of ammunition to Richmond. In May, the steamer was employed in towing blockships into position to obstruct the channels of the Elizabeth River around Norfolk. In that same month, she twice sailed as a flag-of-truce boat to arrange exchanges of wounded Union prisoners and passage north from Norfolk of families wishing to return to the Northern states.

On June 6, 1861, by proclamation of the state's governor, the three-week-old Provisional Navy of Virginia was disbanded and all of its manpower and assets, including Empire, transferred to the Confederate States Navy. It is not known which of the two navies converted Empire into a gunboat, but by mid-June she had become the armed vessel CSS Empire. She was assigned to Captain William F. Lynch's "Mosquito Fleet" of small steam gunboats charged with patrolling the waters of the North Carolina coast.

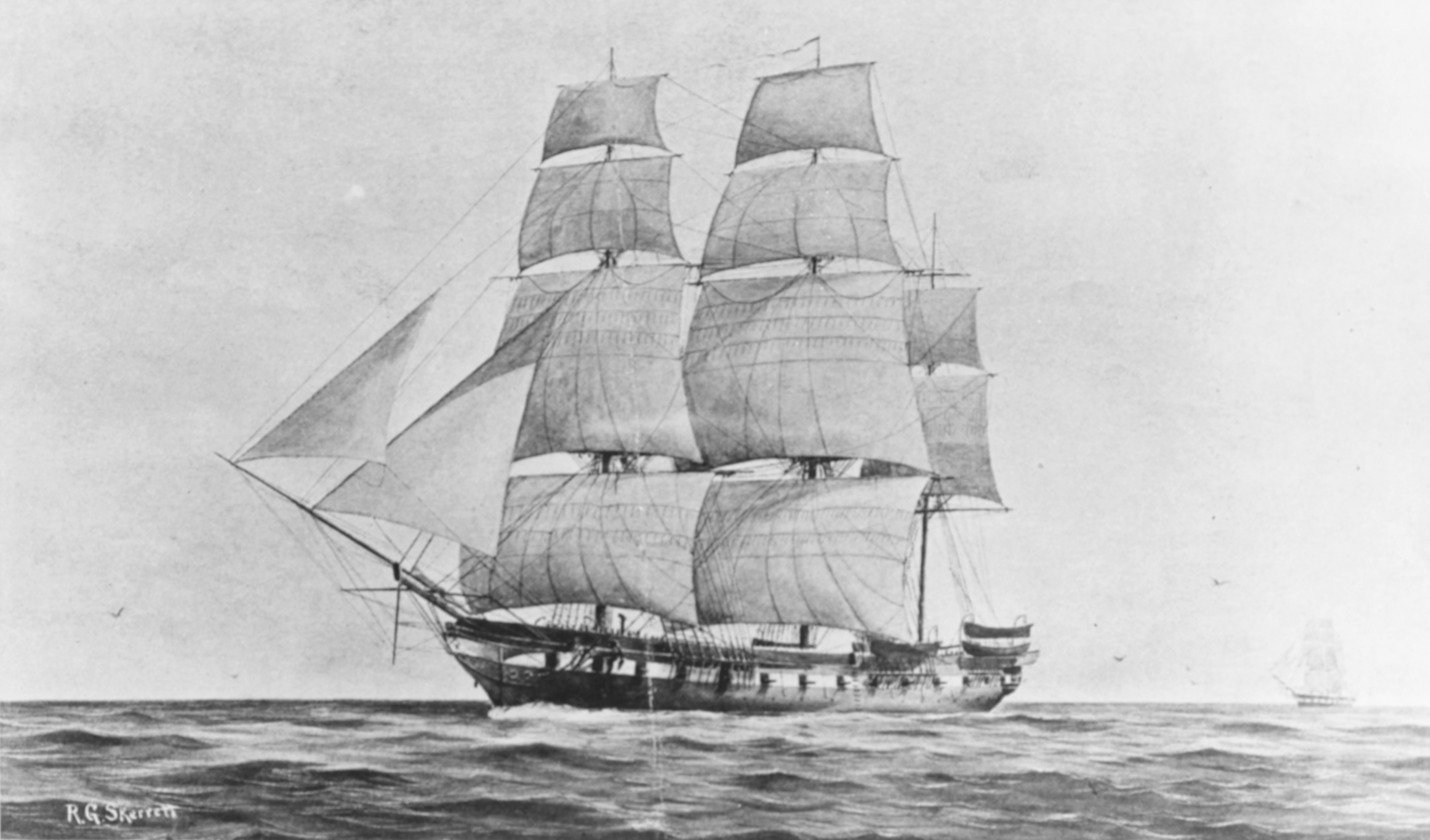
USS Cumberland

On June 16, Empire was engaged in reconnoitering Union forces at Newport News, Virginia, when she spotted the Union steamer Cataline heading toward Fort Monroe. Immediately giving chase, Empire fired twice at the retreating steamer, but on approaching the fort was driven back by fire from the frigate USS Cumberland. Empire during this engagement was partly manned by a contingent of the Richmond Grays, an infantry unit. A few days later, Empire was dispatched one final time under a flag of truce to Fort Monroe, again conveying women and children who wished to return to the North.

=== Fall of Hatteras Island and Chicamacomico Affair, August–October 1861 ===
On August 29, Union forces captured Hatteras Island in the Battle of Hatteras Inlet Batteries. As part of a plan by Confederate commanders to retake the island, Empire was to be armed in September with four guns transported by Superior and two rifled guns transported by Harmony. (Note: The source states that the target was Roanoke Island, however, that was not captured by the Union until the following year; presumably the author intended to reference Hatteras Island, which had been captured by the Union less than a month earlier and which was the target of an attempted Confederate recapture in October.) However, she never received these weapons, her final armament being a single 32-pounder in the bow and a howitzer aft.

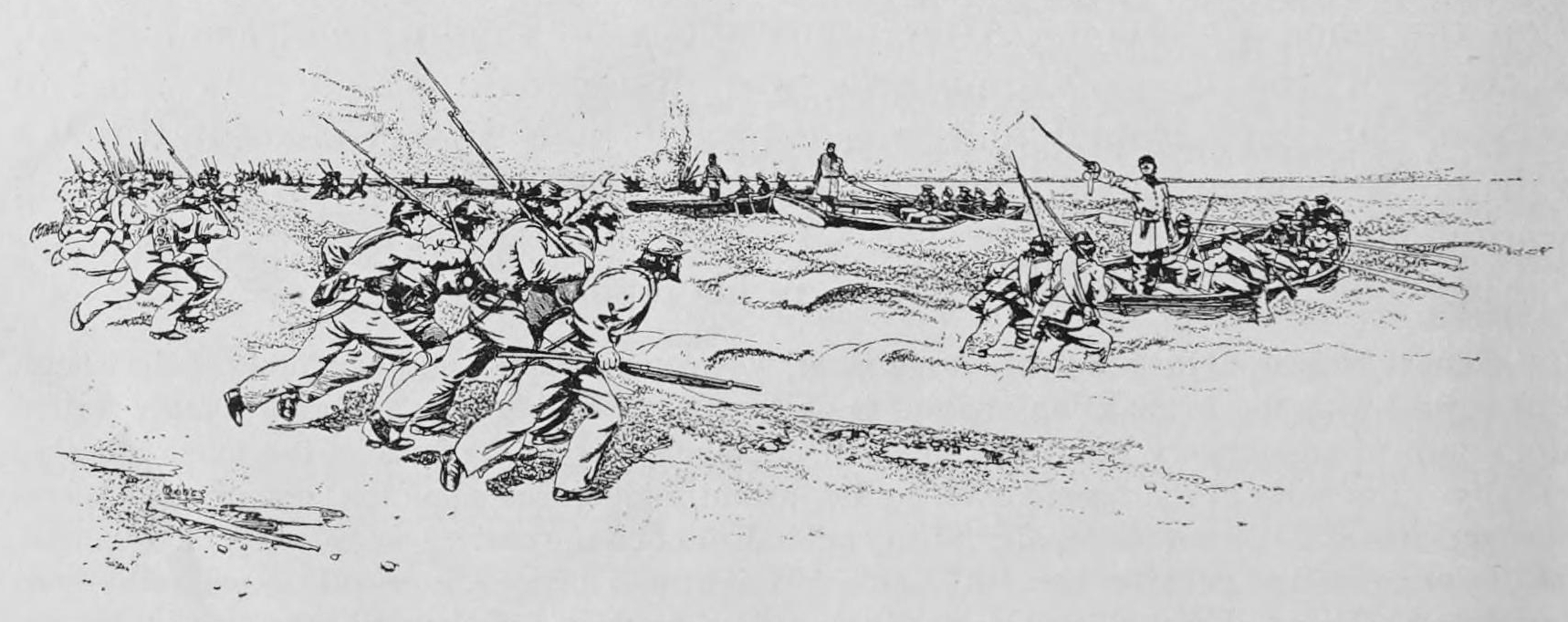
Confederate troops retreating from Hatteras Island, October 6, 1860

On October 4, in an engagement which became known as the "Chicamacomico Affair" or "Chicamacomico Races", a Confederate regimental-sized force landed on Hatteras Island in an attempt to retake it, with Empire providing covering fire during the landing. The Confederate troops proceeded to pursue a Union regiment 26 miles (42 km) along the length of the island, while Empire towed barges carrying a second Confederate regiment to an intended landing point further south in an attempt to cut off the enemy retreat. This latter regiment, however, proved unable to wade ashore due to uneven depth of water. With Union reinforcements arriving the following day, the Confederates on the island were forced to retreat to their original landing point, where they re-embarked. In the final stages of this inconclusive engagement, Empire fired on the Union gunboat USS Monticello on the opposite side of the island, but the latter proved to be out of range. A few days later, Empire arrived at Norfolk towing a barge carrying a small number of Union prisoners taken during the engagement.

On 22 October, Captain Lynch signed a contract with Gilbert Elliot, as agent for J. G. Martin, to build at Elizabeth City, North Carolina, a gunboat hull to be fitted with Empire's engine. The hull would never be completed as Union forces would take control of the region first.

=== Battles of Roanoke Island and Elizabeth City, February 1862 ===
Key to the defense of the North Carolina coast was Roanoke Island in Croatan Sound. If it fell, it would provide Union forces with a secure base from which to threaten multiple coastal towns, forcing the Confederates to either divide their forces into ineffective small groups or abandon the region altogether. Capture of the region would also allow the Union to potentially cut the Weldon Railroad, a vital supply line to the Confederate army in northern Virginia. A Confederate garrison of about 1,400 men was therefore established on the island, and though later expanded to 2,500, the force was still insufficient and lacking in artillery. Empire, by this time renamed CSS Appomattox, nonetheless attempted to improve the island's defenses in early February 1862 by towing blockships to strategic points in Croatan Sound, where they were sunk to obstruct naval movement.

In early February, a Union expeditionary force led by Brigadier-General Ambrose Burnside, consisting of some 60 transports carrying 12,000 troops and supported by a fleet of 20 warships, arrived in Croatan Sound with orders to take Roanoke Island. On February 6, the eve of Burnside's attack, Appomattox was sent to the Sound to reconnoiter the invasion force. Burnside allowed her to do this unhindered, because he wanted the Confederates to know what they were up against.

Appomattox, along with the other seven gunboats of the Mosquito Fleet, was expected to resist Burnside's invasion of Roanoke Island, which took place on 7–8 February. However, she missed the actual battle, having been sent to Edenton in search of gunpowder. She retreated with the surviving Confederate gunboats to the Pasquotank River near Elizabeth City, where a defensive position had been organized. On February 9, Appomattox and CSS Sea Bird steamed back to Roanoke Island to see if any further assistance could be given to the defenders, and to evacuate the garrison at Fort Forrest on Redstone Point. They encountered the Union gunboats advancing up the Sound and immediately fled back to Elizabeth City to join the other defenders.

The Confederate gunboats were attacked by the Union gunboat fleet on February 10. Appomattox kept up a brisk fire from her bow gun until it was accidentally spiked. She then retreated to the entrance of the Dismal Swamp Canal, using the stern howitzer to fire at pursuers. Upon reaching the first lock it was discovered that her beam was two inches (5 cm) too wide to enter. As a result, her commander, Charles Carroll Simms, set the vessel on fire to prevent her capture.

== Rediscovery ==
On November 10, 2009, it was announced by North Carolina's Underwater Archaeology Branch that the wreck of Appomattox had been found. The four-member diving team, who had been searching for the vessel for more than a decade, discovered the shipwreck in August 2007 in the Pasquotank River. The divers found a silver-plated spoon inscribed with the name of a crew member from Appomattox, thus confirming the ship's identity.
