= CSS Forrest =

Gunboat of the Confederate States Navy

History

Confederate States
- Name: Forrest
- Builder: Morgan L. Taylor, New York
- Launched: 1855
- Acquired: 1861
- Home port: Norfolk, Virginia
- Fate: Burned on February 10, 1862

General characteristics
- Type: Steam tug
- Tonnage: 109 tons
- Length: 93 ft (28 m)
- Beam: 17 ft (5.2 m)
- Depth: 7 ft (2.1 m)
- Propulsion: Steam engine, 1 propeller
- Armament: 2 guns: 1 × 32-pounder gun (bow); 1 × howitzer (stern)
- Notes: 1 deck, no mast, round stern, no figurehead (Enrollment no.8: February 29, 1856)

CSS Forrest was a wooden-hulled Confederate gunboat that saw action in the North Carolina sounds in 1861 to 1862. Despite being considered "worn out", she saw continuous service until destroyed after the battle of Elizabeth City in February 1862.

== Ship history ==
The Forrest was originally named the J. A. Smith when launched in 1855. Designed as a canal boat, she was converted to steam in 1856. The Smith was bought at Norfolk in 1861 and renamed Weldon N. Edwards in honor of the President of the North Carolina Secession Convention. She was ordered to Hatteras Inlet by Flag Officer Samuel Barron on July 27, 1861:

from which place you will make every exertion to defend the coasts of that State and harass and annoy the commerce of the enemy. Should you make prizes you will send them either to Norfolk, Va., or some port in North Carolina, as your judgment may determine to be most proper, proceeding in accordance with the law of the Confederate States on the subject of prizes. You will ship any seamen that may offer.

Edwards patrolled Hatteras Inlet in North Carolina under the command of Lt. J. Cooke. In August 1861, Cooke reported to Flag Officer Barron that his ship was "entirely worthless, the boilers worn out and the timbers of his vessel rotten."

By early October, the tug was back in Norfolk, where on the 3rd she received orders from Flag Officer French Forrest to return quickly to Roanoke Island and place the gunboat at the service of local CSN commander William Lynch.

At some point in late 1861, the Edwards name was changed to Forrest. She was part of a five gunboat fleet that attempted to provoke the Union forces at anchor at Hatteras Inlet on November 3, 1861. The Union gunboats did not reply to the Confederate challenge, so the Confederate gunboats retreated with the Curlew towing Forrest back home.

On December 30, 1861, Forrest had to be towed by Curlew to Edenton for repairs. By January 3, 1862, she was back with the rest of the Mosquito Fleet at Roanoke Island. For the rest of the month, Forrest was involved in towing schooners and performing patrolling duties.

Forrest participated in the Battle of Roanoke Island on February 7, 1862, during which her commanding officer, Lt. J. L. Hoole, CSN, was seriously wounded. Furthermore, Forrest was disabled late in the action "by the displacement of her propeller" and towed to Elizabeth City, N.C., for repairs. There, three days later, while out of water on the marine railway, she was burned to prevent capture by Union forces.
