= Pasquotank =

Pasquotank may refer to:

- Pasquotank County, North Carolina
- Pasquotank River, in northeastern North Carolina
