= Machelhe Island =

US river island in North Carolina

Coordinates: 36°18′06″N 76°12′43″W

Machelhe Island is a river island on the Pasquotank River in Camden County, North Carolina, in the United States.

The island's name is a conjoin of Mary, Charles, Eloise, and Helen, the children of the original owner of the site.
