= CSS Black Warrior =

Confederate two-masted schooner

Coordinates: 36.2875°N 76.1901°W

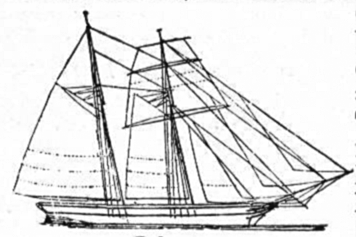
- A schooner-type vessel similar to the Black Warrior

History

Confederate States
- Name: Black Warrior
- Launched: 1859 as M. C. Etheridge
- Commissioned: 1861?
- Fate: Burned at Elizabeth City, North Carolina on February 10, 1862

General characteristics
- Displacement: 144 tons
- Length: 92 ft (28 m)
- Beam: 24 ft (7.3 m)
- Draft: 7 ft (2.1 m)
- Propulsion: Schooner rig, two masts.
- Speed: ?
- Complement: ?
- Armament: 2 × 32-pounder guns

Black Warrior was a Confederate two-masted schooner that participated in the defense of Roanoke Island in North Carolina during the Civil War. Its brief wartime career ended with its burning at Elizabeth City, North Carolina.

== Prewar history ==
The Black Warrior was originally named the M.C. Etheridge. Built in Plymouth, North Carolina, in 1859, she was owned and operated by J. Brown. Initially registered for overseas trade, the Etheridge was enrolled for interstate trade in 1860. In October of that year her documentation was changed back for overseas trade. (Enrollment abstracts, NA)

== Civil War service ==
The Black Warrior was acquired by the Confederate Navy in 1862 and was armed with two 32-pounder guns. Under the command of Lieutenant F. M. Harris, the schooner was part of a nine-gunboat naval squadron tasked with the defense of the northeastern North Carolina sounds. She was at anchor in Croatan Sound under the guns of Fort Forrest when a Union army/navy force under the command of General Ambrose Burnside arrived on February 6, 1862, to invade Roanoke Island. Burnside sent his forces to destroy the remains of the Southern Mosquito Fleet still operating in North Carolina's sounds. Because of her limited mobility and the fact that the Union landing site was well to the south of the schooner, she took no action against the invasion force. The other gunboats of the Confederate squadron engaged in a futile attempt to disrupt the landings on February 7. Late in the day the Black Warrior was detailed to salvage what guns and ammunition she could from the partially sunk gunboat Curlew. That evening the squadron retreated to Elizabeth City to obtain more ammunition. One of the gunboats, the Ellis, took the Black Warrior in tow while the remainder of the squadron made their way overnight to Elizabeth City. (Parker 1883: 247ff)

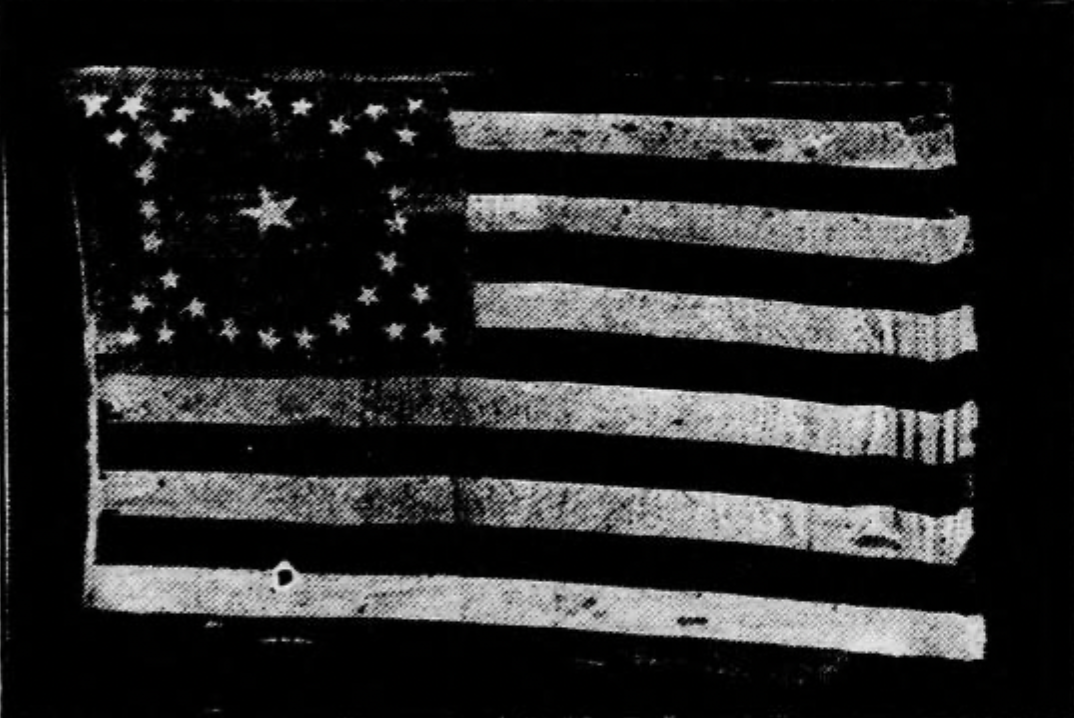
American flag captured by Union Captain William F. Gragg right before the ship sunk

Two of the Confederates' gunboats steamed back to assist the garrison at Roanoke Island but turned around when it became obvious that the island had fallen. However, gunboats were sighted by the Union fleet and pursued back to Elizabeth City. It was decided to anchor Black Warrior near the fort that guarded the approaches to Elizabeth City while the rest of the gunboat squadron formed a line abreast across the channel opposite the fort on the Pasquotank River. On February 10 the Union gunboat squadron, consisting of 14 vessels, simply bypassed the fort and Black Warrior to attack the other Confederate gunboats. Two Confederate gunboats escaped; the rest were either captured or sunk in what became known as the Battle of Elizabeth City.(Parker 1883: 258)

The Black Warrior was initially ignored by the Union fleet, but when she opened fire the USS Whitehead turned and closed in to attack. The crew abandoned ship, setting fire to the Black Warrior and escaping ashore to avoid capture. The crew of the Whitehead attempted to extinguish the fire, but found it was too far advanced and had to withdraw. (ORN 1922: 617)

== Postwar ==
In 2000 the wreck site was mapped and in 2001 a gun carriage was retrieved for display at the Museum of the Albemarle. The wreck was listed on the National Register of Historic Places in 2018.
