= Pasquotank River =

Waterway in North Carolina, United States

Coordinates: 36°9′26″N 76°1′51″W

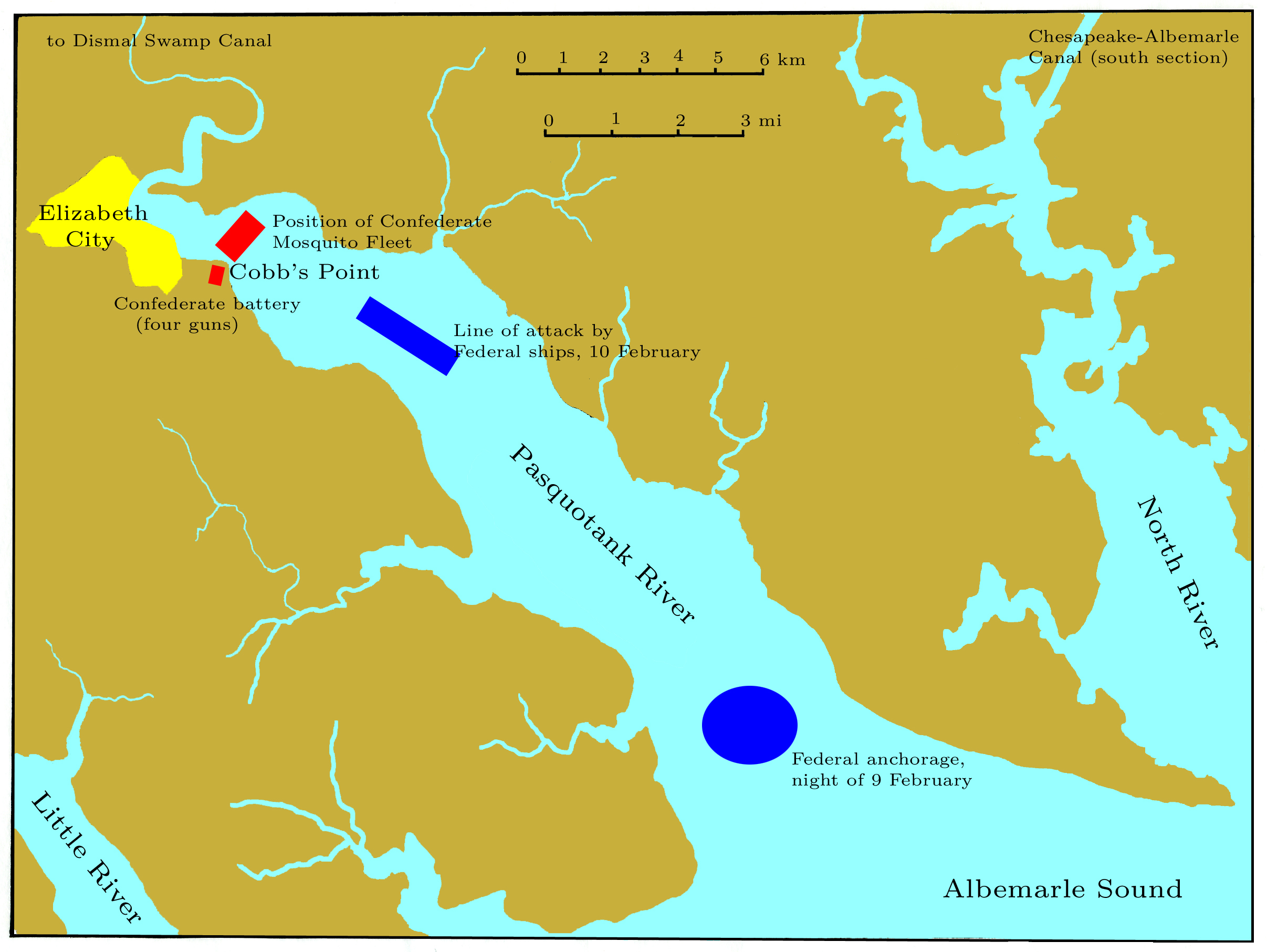
Map of the mouth of the Pasquotank, showing Battle of Elizabeth City

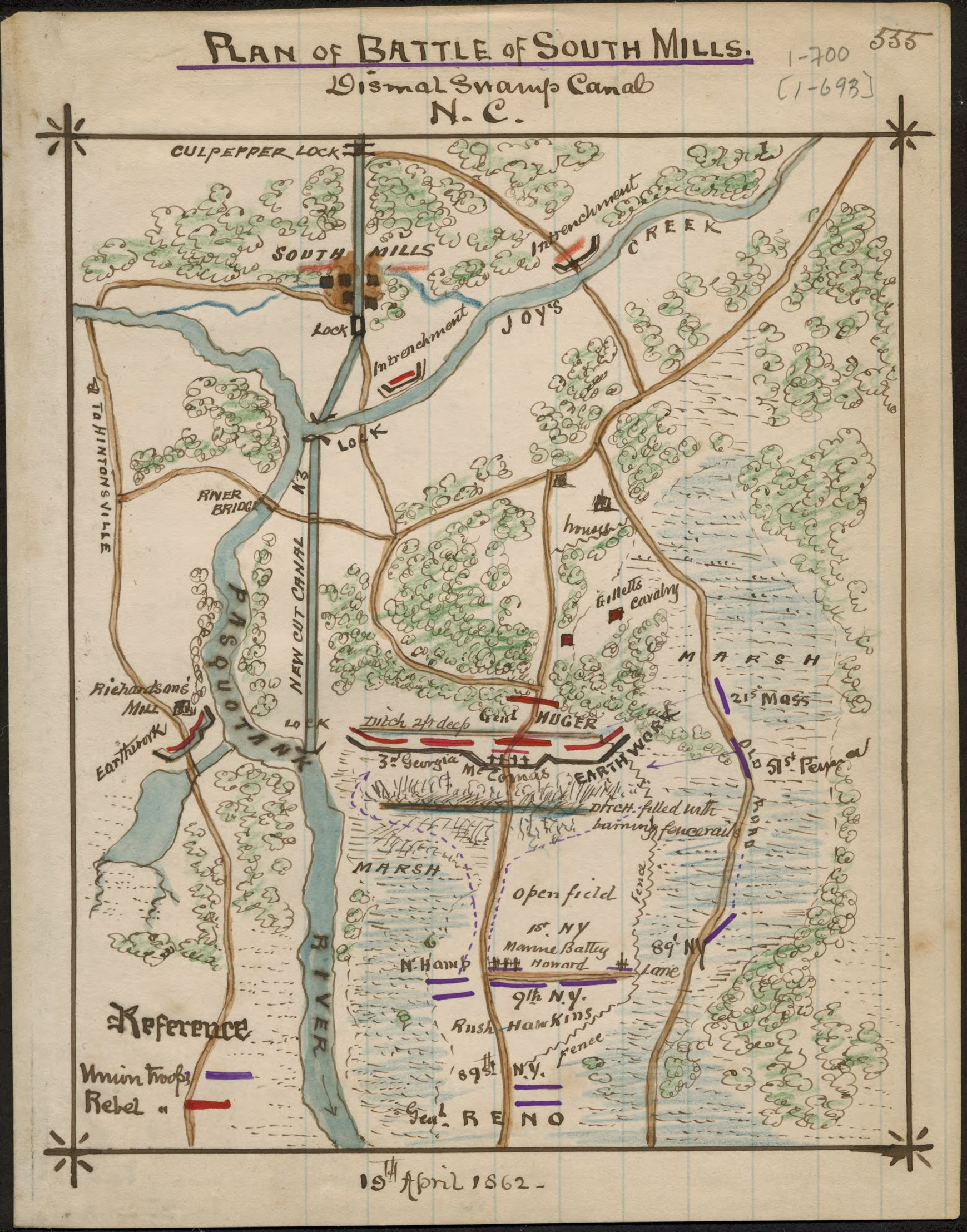
Sketch map of the Battle of South Mills, showing the upper Pasquotank leaving the Great Dismal Swamp

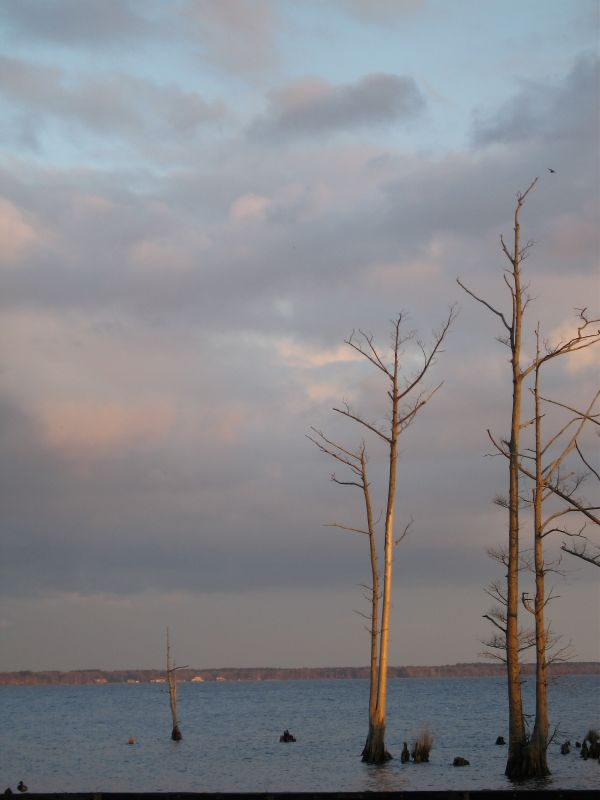
East-facing photo of the river near dusk.

Pasquotank River from Mid-Atlantic Christian University campus

The Pasquotank River /ˈpæskwətæŋk/ is a coastal water-body in Northeastern North Carolina in the United States. Located between Camden and Pasquotank counties, the Pasquotank is a tributary of the Albemarle Sound estuary and is part of the Intracoastal Waterway via Elizabeth City.

Machelhe Island is a river island on the Pasquotank River.

== History ==
The name "Pasquotank" is derived from pashetanki, a Carolina Algonquian word translated as "where the current forks." The river was originally controlled by the Secotan people, and later gained importance in trade and shipping during the colonial period of North Carolina.

The Battle of Elizabeth City was fought on the Pasquotank River where a small Confederate fleet was sunk in defense of the City. The Confederate ships sunk on the Pasquotank River in the battle were the CSS Black Warrior, CSS Fanny, CSS Sea Bird, and the CSS Appomattox.

Some principal industries along the Pasquotank were transport, logging, and oyster harvesting. Since the twentieth century, the commercial viability of the river has declined, as more traffic uses the Intracoastal Waterway by way of Coinjock. The river is now primarily frequented by pleasure boaters.
