= USS Morse =

Gunboat of the United States Navy

History

United States
- Name: USS Morse
- Builder: Roosevelt & Joyce
- Christened: Marion
- Completed: 1859
- Acquired: 7 November 1861
- Commissioned: 9 November 1861
- Decommissioned: 21 May 1865
- Renamed: USS Morse (1861)
- Fate: Sold, 20 July 1865

General characteristics
- Tonnage: 514
- Length: 143 ft (44 m)
- Beam: 33 ft (10 m)
- Draught: 8 ft 6 in (2.59 m)
- Propulsion: 1 × 500 hp, 38-in bore × 9 ft stroke vertical beam steam engine; side paddlewheels
- Speed: 9 to 11 knots
- Armament: two 9" guns

USS Morse was a ferryboat acquired by the Union Navy during the American Civil War.

== Construction and design ==
Morse, originally named Marion, was a sidewheel ferryboat built at New York in 1859 by Roosevelt, Joyce & Co. She was 142 feet 6 inches (43.43 m) in length, with a beam of 33 feet (10 m), draft of 8 feet 6 inches (2.59 m) and hold depth of 12 feet 4 inches (3.76 m). Marion was powered by a 500 hp single-cylinder vertical beam steam engine with 38 inches (0.97 m) bore and 9 feet (2.7 m) stroke, built by the Novelty Iron Works of New York.

== Service history ==
Marion was purchased by the Navy on 7 November 1861, renamed Morse, and armed with two 9 in (230 mm) guns. She was commissioned 9 November 1861, Acting Master Peter Hays in command.

Morse arrived at Hampton Roads, Virginia, on 20 November 1861 to join the North Atlantic Blockading Squadron. She lay off Newport News, Virginia, until 29 December when she steamed across Hampton Roads in an attempt to capture the CSS Sea Bird; Morse's shelling drove the steamer to the protection of three batteries at Sewell's Point.

Heated action began for Morse in January 1862 when she joined the Roanoke Island expedition with 16 additional shallow draft gunboats. The expedition departed Hampton Roads 11 January and began bombarding the fortifications 7 February. The campaign resulted in Union capture of the island 8 February, threatening Confederate communications and opening the rear defenses to Norfolk, Virginia.

On 9 February, Morse and USS Commodore Perry steamed up Croatan Sound for Elizabeth City, North Carolina, to destroy Confederate gunboats and break up canal communications. Crossing Dismal Swamp Canal, the gunboats spotted Confederate ships and shore batteries. Firing from the ships drove the southerners from their guns and scattered the Confederate vessels. The Union squadron captured or destroyed Confederate ships Sea Bird, Fanny, Ellie, Forrest, and Black Warrior, permitting capture of the town 10 February.

Morse and five additional gunboats departed Hatteras Inlet 23 February to reconnoiter Croatan Sound. Strong Confederate forces at Winton, North Carolina, opened heavy fire on USS Delaware, the lead ship, with artillery and musketry. The ships returned the attack, firing on the battery and landing the 9th New York Zouaves, who entered Winton, destroying military stores, tents, arms, and gear.

Morse departed Hatteras Inlet with 12 other ships 12 March for Brant Island, Neuse River to cover the disembarkation of troops in the New Berne campaign. The joint Army Navy expedition captured the town 14 March and the last of the batteries the 16th.

Morse spent the remainder of the spring and summer scouting and patrolling the York River, protecting transports and aiding operations of the Army on Pamunkey River in June. Joining the James River Flotilla in July, she captured supplies on Mattapony River the following May, scouting the river to Frazier's Ferry and silencing Confederate guns above West Point, Virginia. Morse joined seven others in capturing Fort Powhatan, James River 14 July 1863.

In November, Morse joined the expedition to Mathews County, Virginia, a peninsula between Mobjack Bay and Piankatank River and a base for Confederate raiders. Information from captured guerrillas on plans to capture a schooner and to destroy the lights on Chesapeake Bay sent Morse up East River to throttle these efforts.

After searching out torpedoes (mines) on Purtan Bay in February 1864, Morse joined General Wister's campaign on the Mattapony River, attacking King and Queen Courthouse. One thousand infantry went ashore from the Union ships at Sheppard's Landing 13 March. After a feint attack on West Point, Virginia, in May, Morse evacuated troops from that point. After scouting duty throughout the spring and summer, Morse joined the Potomac Flotilla later in the winter.

Morse relieved Delaware on the Rappahannock River in March 1865, aiding the Army in its efforts to take Fort Lowry. She decommissioned and went to the Washington Navy Yard 21 May. Morse was sold there at public auction to the East Boston Ferry Co., 20 July. Redocumented Lincoln 12 December, she continued to serve American commerce until abandoned in 1885.
