= USS Hetzel =

Gunboat of the United States Navy

- USS Hetzel as she appeared during her Civil War service.

History

United States
- Laid down: not known
- Launched: 1861
- Acquired: 21 August 1861
- Commissioned: 21 August 1861
- Decommissioned: October 1865
- Stricken: 1865 (est.)
- Fate: Returned to Coast Survey, October 1865.; Beginning in 1868 towed and used only for living quarters. In 1872 sunk at anchorage in Edenton Bay and raised and used again for housing until abandoned in 1874.

General characteristics
- Displacement: 200 tons
- Length: 150 ft (46 m)
- Beam: 22 ft (6.7 m)
- Draft: 7.5 ft (2.3 m)
- Propulsion: Steam engine; Side wheel-propelled
- Speed: Not known
- Complement: Not known
- Armament: 1 × 9 in (230 mm) gun; 1 × 80-pounder gun

USS Hetzel was a steamer acquired by the Union Navy during the American Civil War. She was used by the Navy to patrol navigable waterways of the Confederacy to prevent the South from trading with other countries.

== Construction and commissioning ==
Hetzel, a sidewheel steamer, was built in 1861 at Baltimore, Maryland, for the United States Coast Survey and was transferred to the Navy Department 21 August 1861. Her first commanding officer was Lt. H. K. Davenport.

== Assigned to the North Atlantic Blockade ==
Hetzel was assigned to the North Atlantic Blockading Squadron, and arrived Newport News, Virginia, 18 November 1861. Her first taste of action came 2 December, when Confederate steamer Patrick Henry stood out into Hampton Roads and engaged several Union gunboats, including Hetzel. The Federal ships succeeded in damaging Patrick Henry in a 2-hour engagement.

== North Carolina operations ==
The ship was next sent to the coast of North Carolina to participate in a series of successful moves by joint forces in that area. Arriving 4 January 1862 off Hatteras Inlet, Hetzel got underway with the fleet 5 February for the joint amphibious assault on Roanoke Island. She took part in the initial bombardment of the Confederate works 7 February, and, after the landing of troops under cover of naval guns, helped to consolidate the Union victory next day. Commander Rowan's forces quickly capitalized on their important victory by pursuing the retreating Confederate squadron up the Pasquotank River. At Elizabeth City, North Carolina, Hetzel and the other ships engaged Confederate batteries and destroyed or captured five Southern gunboats 10 February as Union forces strengthened their hold on the sounds of North Carolina.

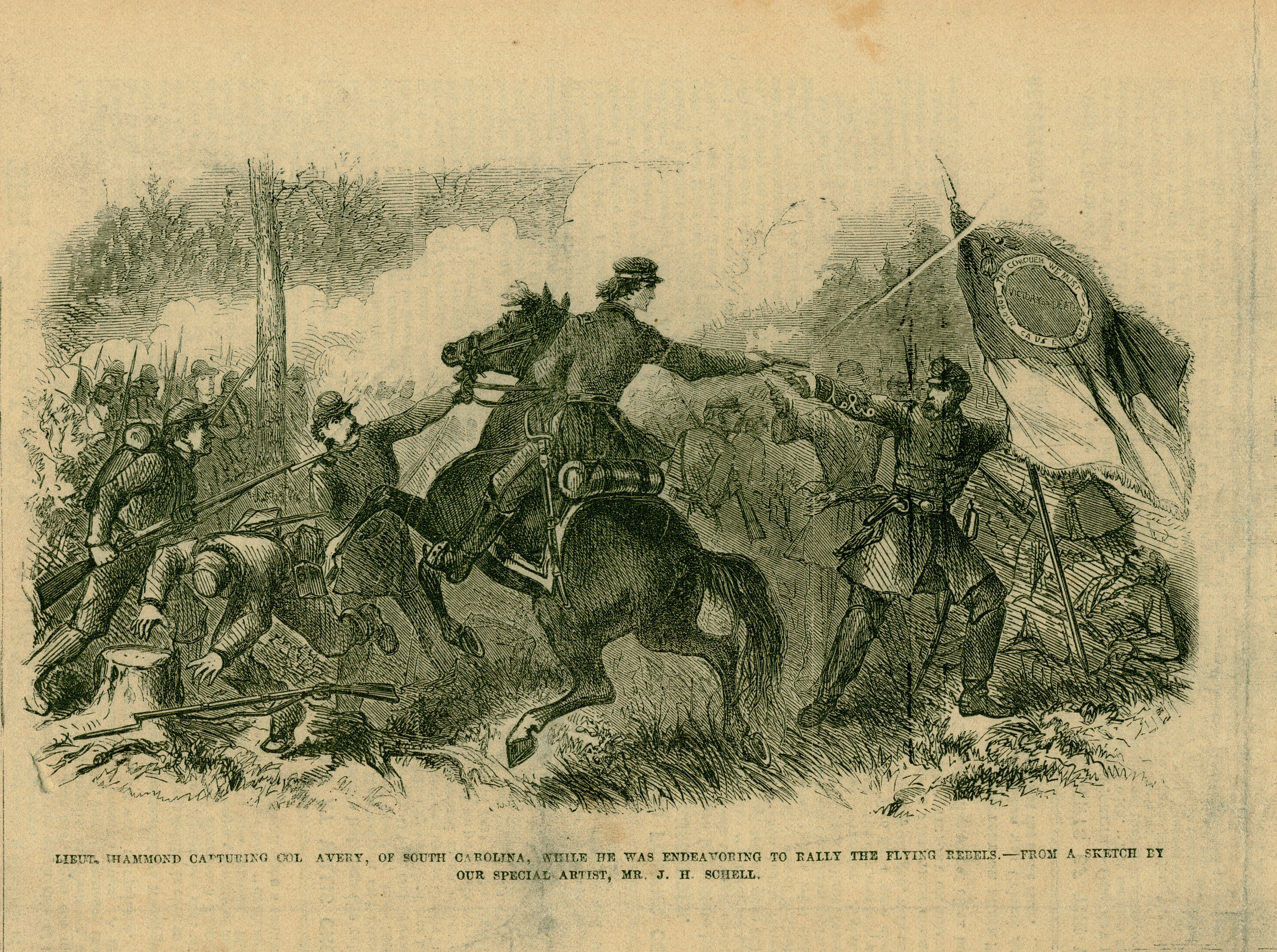
"Lieut. Hammond of the Hetzel capturing Col. Avery, of North Carolina, while He was endeavoring to Rally the Flying Rebels; Battle of New Bern (1862)

As the joint operations in North Carolina continued. Hetzel took part in the attack on New Bern, 13 and 14 March 1862. Getting underway and steaming up the Neuse River at night, the gunboats under Commander Rowan supported the landings by Army and Marines at the town, passed obstructions in the river, and carried troops for the occupation. This combined operation behind the big guns of the Navy captured the key depot at New Bern with a veritable arsenal of supplies. Hetzel was assigned to the sounds of North Carolina following this victory, and spent much of the rest of the war on blockading duty in that area. She participated in an expedition to Hamilton, North Carolina, and Williamston, North Carolina, 2–9 November 1862 to look for ironclads rumored to be building by Confederates in the area, but found none.

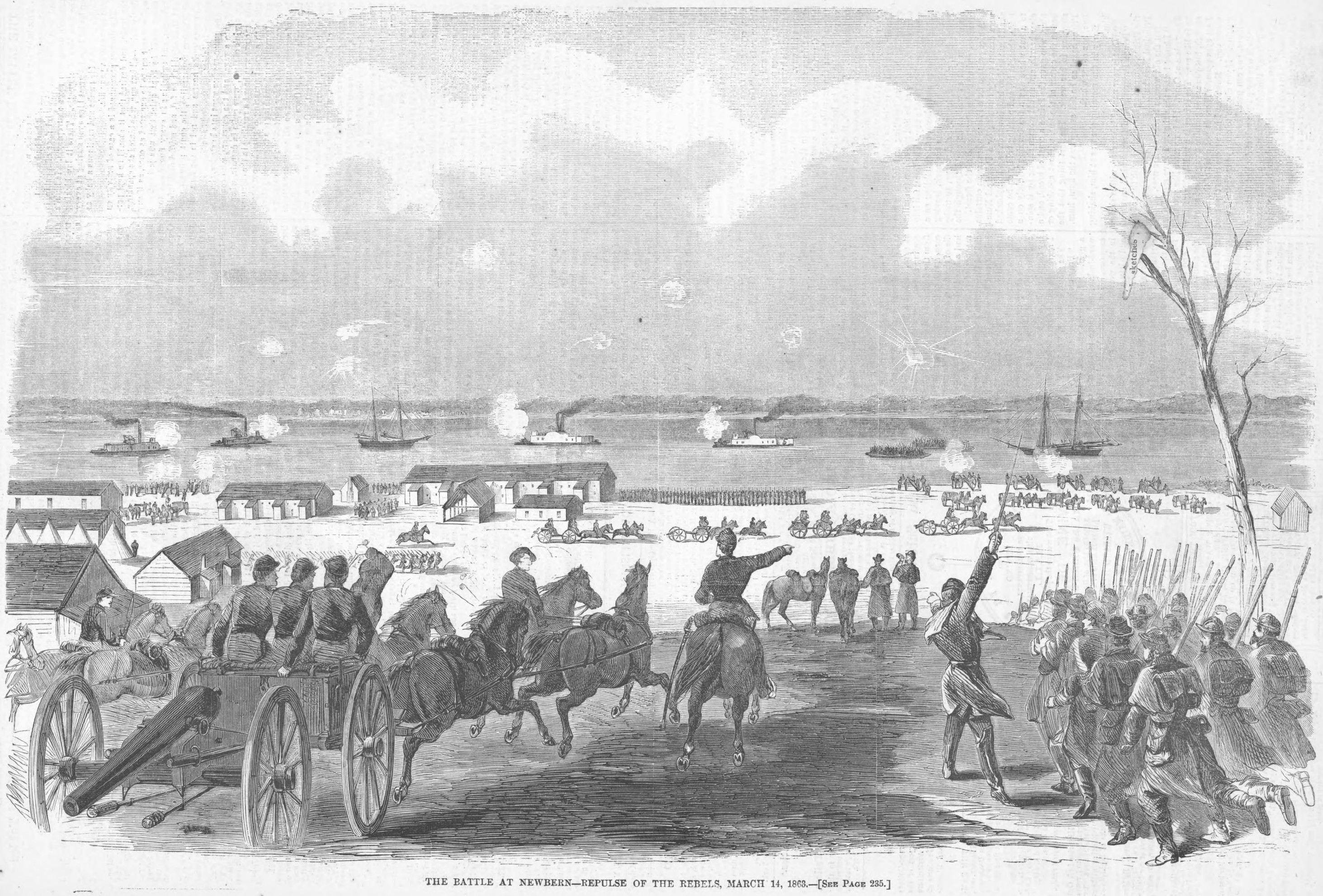
Operations at Fort Anderson opposite New Bern

In March 1863 the ship assisted in the defense of Fort Anderson, opposite New Bern, when it was threatened by Confederate troops. They attacked 13–14 March and the accurate fire of Hetzel, Hunchback and other gunboats was credited with saving the fortification from capture.

== End-of-war operations ==
Hetzel was active in the sounds of North Carolina, at New Berne and Washington, until November 1864. She acted during this time as command ship for the area, as her commander was senior officer of the sounds. During the course of the war she shared in the capture of five steamers, six schooners, and one sloop, as Union blockaders effectively shut off the Confederacy from outside trade. Hetzel returned to Hampton Roads in November 1864 for much-needed repairs, sailing for North Carolina and her former blockading station again 29 May 1865.

== Hetzel returned to the U.S. Coast Survey ==
She finally returned north in October 1865 and was returned to the U.S. Coast Survey during that month.
