= Battle of Roanoke Island =

1862 American Civil War battle

Coordinates: 35.8783°N 75.6678°W

- Part of the American Civil War
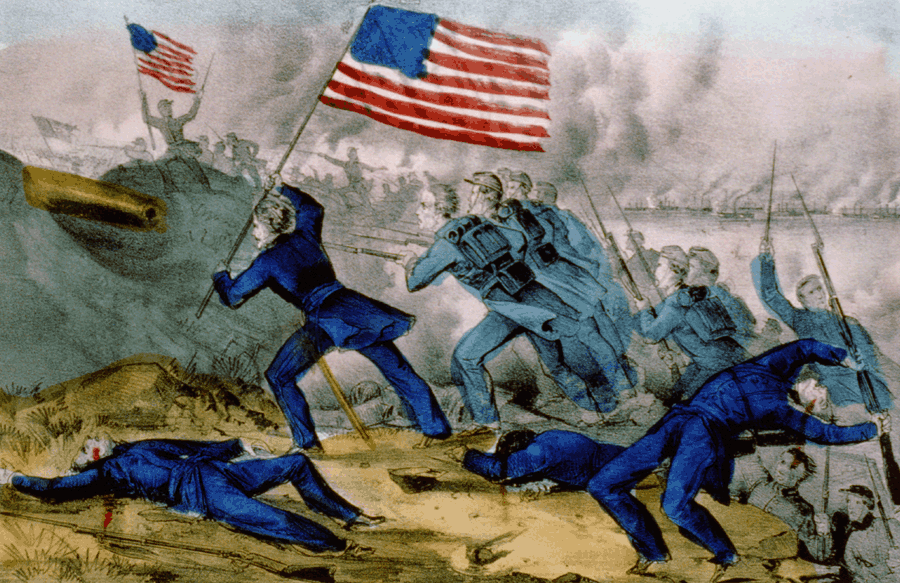
- Capture of Roanoke Island, Feby. 8th 1862, by Currier and Ives
Date	February 7, 1862 – February 8, 1862
Location	Roanoke Island and Croatan Sound, North Carolina
Result	Union victory

Belligerents
United States (Union)	(Confederate States of America) CSA (Confederacy)

Commanders and leaders
Ambrose Burnside; Louis M. Goldsborough	Henry A. Wise; Henry M. Shaw

Units involved
Department of North Carolina; North Atlantic Blockading Squadron	Wise's Legion

Strength
10,000	3,000

Casualties and losses
264 total 37 killed 214 wounded 13 missing	2,643 total 23 killed 58 wounded 62 missing 2,500 captured 30 guns captured

The opening phase of what came to be called the Burnside Expedition, the Battle of Roanoke Island was an amphibious operation of the American Civil War, fought on February 7–8, 1862, in the North Carolina Sounds a short distance south of the Virginia border. The attacking force consisted of a flotilla of gunboats of the Union Navy drawn from the North Atlantic Blockading Squadron, commanded by Flag Officer Louis M. Goldsborough, a separate group of gunboats under Union Army control, and an army division led by Brig. Gen. Ambrose Burnside. The defenders were a group of gunboats from the Confederate States Navy, termed the Mosquito Fleet, under Capt. William F. Lynch, and about 2,000 Confederate soldiers commanded locally by Brig. Gen. Henry A. Wise. The defense was augmented by four forts facing on the water approaches to Roanoke Island, and two outlying batteries. At the time of the battle, Wise was hospitalized, so leadership fell to his second in command, Col. Henry M. Shaw.

During the first day of the battle, the Federal gunboats and the forts on shore engaged in a gun battle, with occasional contributions from the Mosquito Fleet. Late in the day, Burnside's soldiers went ashore unopposed; they were accompanied by six howitzers manned by sailors. As it was too late to fight, the invaders went into camp for the night.

On the second day, February 8, the Union soldiers advanced but were stopped by an artillery battery and accompanying infantry in the center of the island. Although the Confederates thought that their line was safely anchored in impenetrable swamps, they were flanked on both sides and their soldiers were driven back to refuge in the forts. The forts were taken in reverse. With no way for his men to escape, Col. Shaw surrendered to avoid pointless bloodshed.

== Background ==
Northeastern North Carolina is dominated by its sounds; large but shallow bodies of brackish-to-salt water that lie between the mainland and the Outer Banks. Although they are all one body, intimately connected and having a common water level, they are conceptually divided into several distinct regions. The largest of these is Pamlico Sound, immediately behind Hatteras Island; to its north is the second largest, Albemarle Sound, which extends almost to the southern border of Virginia. The linkage between these two, somewhat narrow, is further constricted by Roanoke Island. The portion of the waterway between Roanoke Island and the mainland is known as Croatan Sound. Both the island and the sound are about ten miles (16 km) long. The sound at its widest point is a little more than 4 miles (6.4 km) across, the island about half that. On the eastern side of the island is Roanoke Sound, much narrower, shallower, and less important.

Several North Carolina cities were sited on the sounds, among them New Bern (usually written as "New Berne" in the mid-nineteenth century), Beaufort, Edenton, and Elizabeth City. Others, not lying directly on the sounds, were accessible to the rivers that emptied into them. As much as a third of the state is in their watershed. Through most of the first year of the Civil War, the Confederate forces retained control of the sounds, so that coastwise water-borne commerce of the eastern part of the state was unimpeded. The sounds were linked to Norfolk, Virginia by the Albemarle and Chesapeake Canal and the Dismal Swamp Canal. The blockade of Norfolk could not be complete so long as cargoes could reach the city through its back door. Communications were not affected appreciably when Federal forces captured the forts on the Outer Banks at Hatteras Inlet in August 1861, as the Union Navy could not bring its deep-water vessels into the sounds through the shallow inlets.

Roanoke Island was the key to control of the Sounds. If controlled by the Union forces, they would have a base that could be attacked only by an amphibious operation, which the Rebels could not mount. If the Union established naval superiority there, all points on the mainland shores would be equally vulnerable to assault. The Confederate defenders would be forced into an impossible situation: they would either have to give up some positions without a fight, or they would have to spread their assets too thin to be of any use.

== Prelude ==
=== Confederate defense ===
The defense of Roanoke Island started in an accidental manner. When the Federal fleet appeared off Hatteras Inlet on August 27, 1861, the 3rd Georgia Infantry Regiment was hastily sent from Norfolk to help hold the forts there, but the forts fell before they arrived, so they were diverted to Roanoke Island. They remained there for the next three months, making somewhat desultory efforts to expel the Union forces from Hatteras Island.

Little was done to secure the position until early October, when Brig. Gen. Hill was assigned to command the coastal defenses of North Carolina in the vicinity of the sounds. Hill set his soldiers to putting up earthworks across the center of the island, but he was called away to service in Virginia before they were completed. Shortly after his departure, his district was split in two; the southern part was assigned to Brig. Gen. Lawrence O'B. Branch, while the northern part was put in control of Henry A. Wise, whose command included Albemarle Sound and Roanoke Island, but not Pamlico Sound and its cities. It is also significant that Branch reported to Brig. Gen. Richard C. Gatlin, who commanded the Department of North Carolina, while Wise was under Maj. Gen. Benjamin Huger, who was in charge of the defenses of Norfolk.

Wise had been commander of the so-called Wise Legion, but his troops did not accompany him. The Legion was broken up, although he was able to retain two of his old regiments, the 46th and 59th Virginia. He also had three regiments of North Carolina troops, the 2nd, 8th, and 31st North Carolina, plus three companies of the 17th North Carolina. The men from North Carolina were ill-equipped and poorly clothed, often armed with nothing more than their own shotguns. All told, the number came to about 1,400 infantrymen, but the number available for duty was smaller than that because the living conditions put as many as one-fourth of the command on the sick list.

Wise begged Richmond to send him some guns, as had Hill before him, but the numbers that were actually sent were inadequate. They were distributed into several nominal forts: facing Croatan Sound were twelve guns in Fort Huger, at Weir's Point, the northwestern corner of the island; four guns in Fort Blanchard, about a mile (1.6 km) to the southeast; and nine guns in Fort Bartow, at Pork Point, about a quarter of the way down the island. Across the sound, at Redstone Point opposite Fort Huger, two old canal barges had been pushed up onto the mud, protected by sandbags and cotton bales, armed with seven guns, and named Fort Forrest. These were all the guns that would bear on the sound; the southern half of the island, nearest Pamlico Sound, in the direction from which the attack would come, was unprotected. Five other guns did not face Croatan Sound: a battery of two guns on the eastern side of the island protected against possible assault across Roanoke Sound, and three others occupied an earthwork near the geometric center of the island.

Wise made one other contribution to the defense. He found some pile drivers, and was able to impede the sound between Forts Huger and Forrest by a double row of piles, augmented by sunken hulks. The barrier was still being worked on when the attack came.

The Confederate Navy also made a contribution to the defense. Seven gunboats, mounting a total of only eight guns, formed the Mosquito Fleet, commanded by Flag Officer William F. Lynch. Wise, for one, believed that their net contribution was negative. Not only were their guns taken from the forts on the island, but so were their crews. He gave vent to his feelings after the battle:

Captain Lynch was energetic, zealous, and active, but he gave too much consequence entirely to his fleet of gunboats, which hindered transportation of piles, lumber, forage, supplies of all kinds, and of troops, by taking away the steam-tugs and converting them into perfectly imbecile gunboats.

Despite Wise's disapproval, the Mosquito Fleet was part of the defense, and the Union forces would have to deal with it.

=== Union offense ===
A short time after Hatteras Island was captured for the Union, Burnside began to promote the idea of a Coast Division, to be composed of fishermen, dockworkers, and other watermen from the northeastern states, and used to attack coastal areas. He reasoned that such men were already familiar with ships, and therefore would be easy to train for amphibious operations. Burnside was a close friend of General-in-Chief George B. McClellan, so he got a respectful hearing. Although Burnside had initially intended to operate in the Chesapeake Bay, in the hands of McClellan and the War Department his ideas were soon transformed into a planned assault on the North Carolina interior coast, beginning with Roanoke Island. An unspoken reason for the change of target was the mistaken belief that pro-Union sentiment was being suppressed in North Carolina, and an invasion would allow them to express their true loyalties. When it was fleshed out, the invasion of North Carolina came to be known as the Burnside Expedition.

As recruiting progressed, Burnside organized the Coast Division into three brigades, led by three friends from his Military Academy days. Brig. Gen. John G. Foster led the First Brigade, Brig. Gen. Jesse L. Reno the Second, and Brig. Gen. John G. Parke the Third. In early January, nearly 13,000 men were ready for duty.

Although the Union Navy would provide most of the gunnery that would be needed to suppress the Rebel batteries, Burnside decided to have some gunboats under Army control. This immediately led to some interference between the two services. The Navy had no vessels sturdy enough to go to sea and at the same time draw little enough water to be able to pass through the shallow inlet, thought to be about 8 feet (2.4 m). They therefore had to buy suitable merchant ships for conversion, at the very time that Burnside and his agents were also dickering for their ships. Because the sailors were more experienced, they were able to get most of the more suitable ships. The Army was left with a mixed bag of rickety ships that were barely seaworthy. By the time the expedition got under way, the Navy had 20 gunboats, and the Coast Division had nine. The armada was supplemented by several canal boats converted into floating batteries, mounting boat howitzers and protected by sandbags and bales of hay. All told, the expedition carried 108 pieces of ordnance.

While Burnside's agents were purchasing the gunboats they were also buying or leasing other vessels to be used as transports. The soldiers and transports for the expedition assembled at Annapolis. Embarkation began on January 5, 1862, and on January 9 they began to get under way, with orders to rendezvous at Fort Monroe, near the entrance to the Chesapeake Bay. There they met the naval contingent, and on January 11 they set sail. Until this time, only Burnside and his immediate staff knew their ultimate destination. Once at sea, the captain of each ship opened his sealed orders and learned that his ship should proceed to the vicinity of Cape Hatteras.

== Battle ==
=== From Chesapeake Bay to Pamlico Sound ===
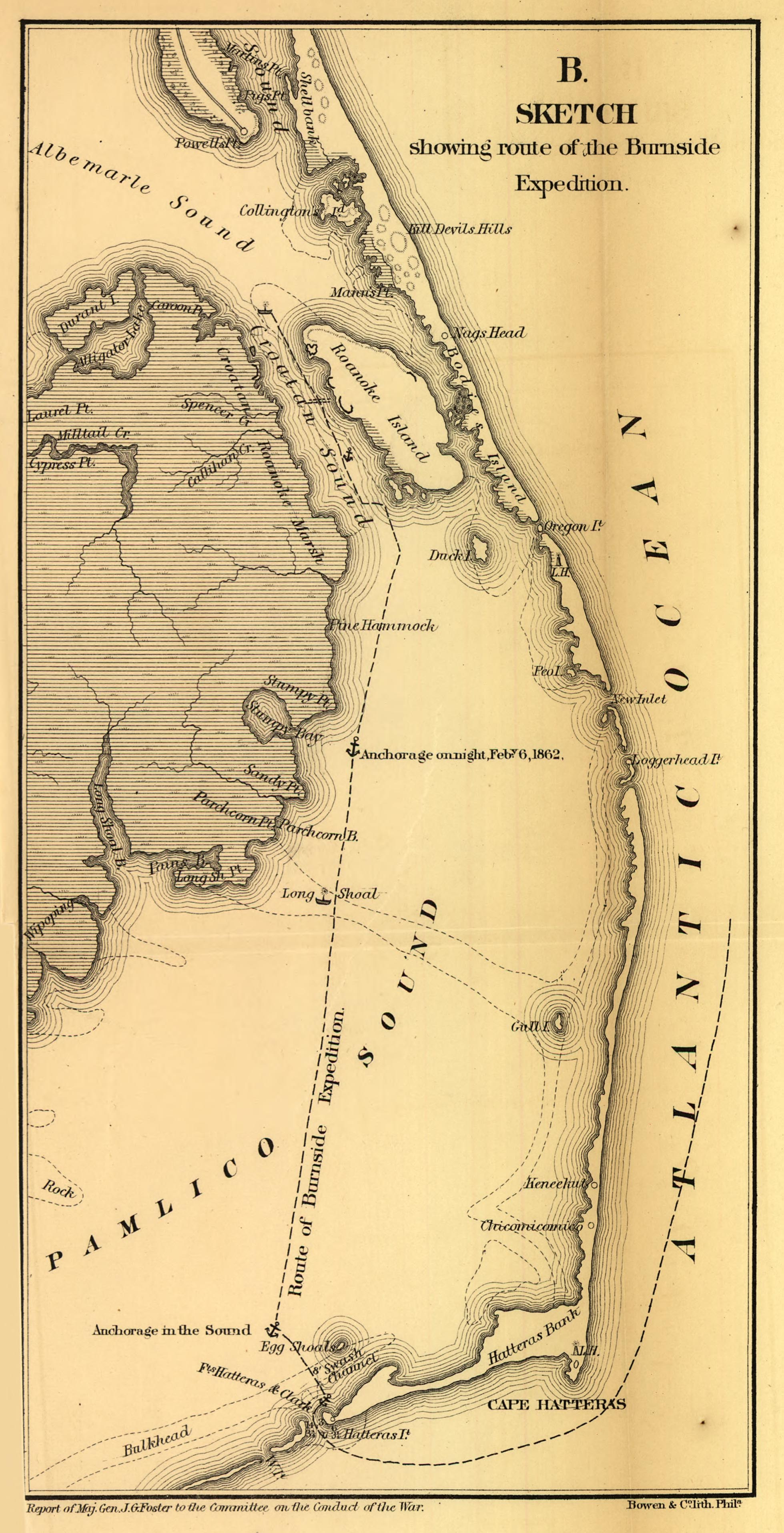
Sketch showing route of Burnside's forces to Hatteras Inlet. U.S. Government Printing Office, 1866

For many of the Federal soldiers, the voyage to Hatteras Inlet was the worst part of the battle. Earning its reputation, the weather in the vicinity of Cape Hatteras turned foul, causing many of them to become seasick. In an act of bravado, Burnside left his comfortable quarters aboard the transport George Peabody and with his staff went aboard Army gunboat Picket. He chose this vessel because he considered her to be the least seaworthy ship in his command, and by showing his troops that he was willing to share their misery, he earned their devotion. When the storm struck, he began to doubt the wisdom of his move, but Picket survived and got him safely to his destination. Three vessels in the armada were not so lucky: City of New York, laden with ordnance and supplies; Pocahontas, carrying horses; and Army gunboat Zouave were all lost, although all persons aboard were rescued. The only personnel losses were two officers of the 9th New Jersey, who were drowned when their surfboat overturned following a visit to the flagship.

The entry into Pamlico Sound through Hatteras Inlet was time consuming. The swash, thought to be eight feet (2.4 m) deep, was found the hard way to be only six feet (1.8 m). Some of the Union Army ships drew too much to get across, and had to be kedged in after being lightened. Others were too deep even to be kedged in; the men or materials they carried had to be brought ashore on Hatteras Island, and the ships sent back. Bark John Trucks never made it at all; she could not get close enough to Hatteras Island even for the men aboard to be taken off. She returned to Annapolis with the majority of the regiment, the 53rd New York, and only a detachment of the command was active in the Battle of Roanoke Island. Not until February 4 was the fleet as ready as it ever would be and assembled in Pamlico Sound.

While the Northern fleet was struggling over the bar, the Confederates were strangely inert. No reinforcements were sent to the island, nor, for that matter, any of the other possible targets in the region. The number of infantrymen on the island remained at about 1,400, with 800 in reserve at Nag's Head. The major change was negative: on February 1 Wise came down with what he called "pleurisy, with high fever and spitting of blood, threatening pneumonia." He was confined to bed at Nag's Head, and remained hospitalized until February 8, after the battle was over. Although he continued to issue orders, effective command on Roanoke Island fell to Col. H. M. Shaw of the 8th North Carolina Infantry.

=== First day: Bombardment ===
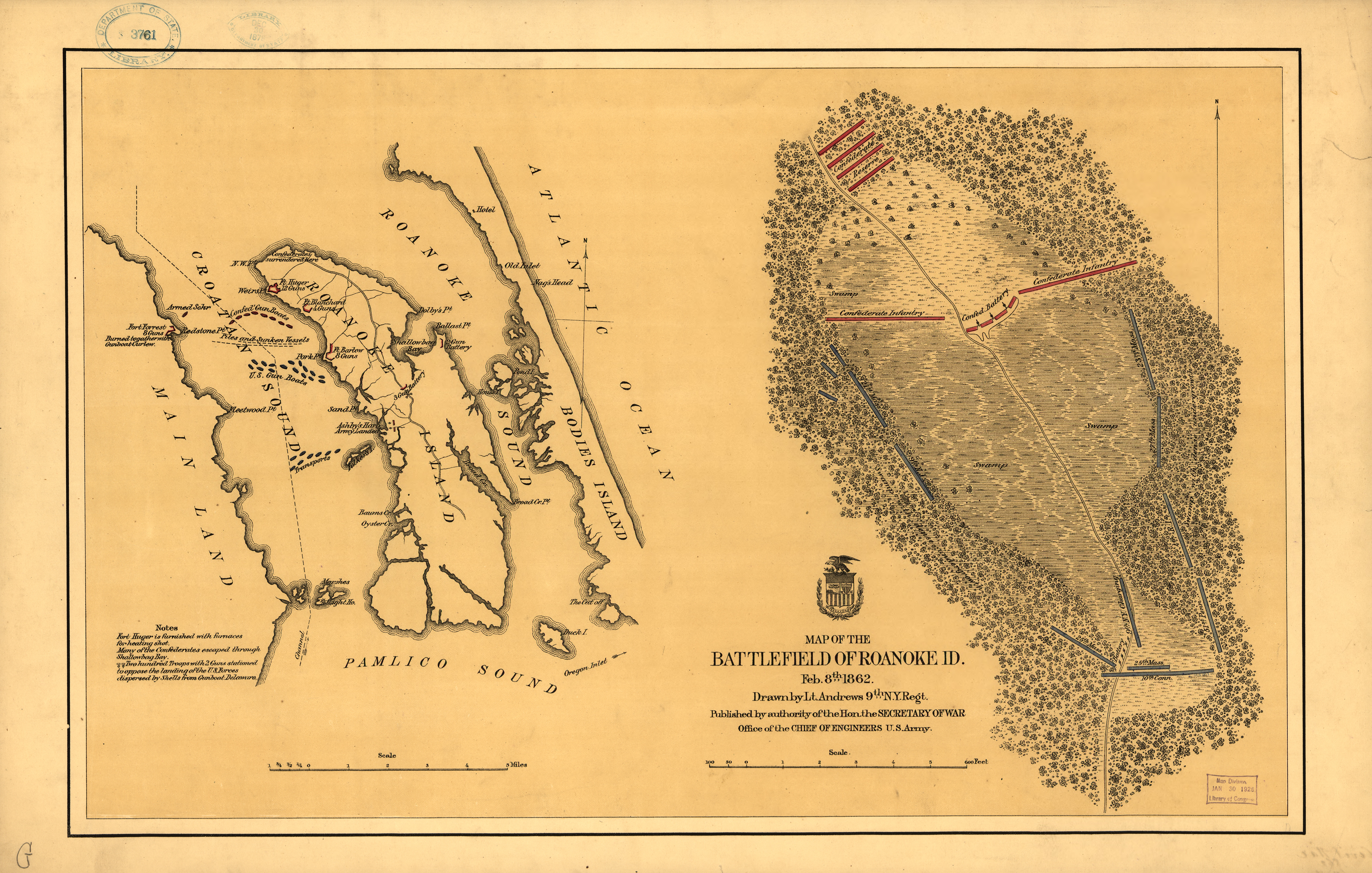
Map of Roanoke Island, showing forts and fleet dispositions, February 7, 1862, on the left, and on the right, the battlefield where the opposing armies met on February 8. Prepared by Lt. Andrews, 9th N.Y. Regiment.

The fleet got under way early the morning after they had assembled in the sound (February 5), and by nightfall were near the southern end of Roanoke Island, where they anchored. Rain and strong winds prevented movements the next day. The major activity was Goldsborough's shift of his flag from USS Philadelphia to Southfield. On February 7 the weather moderated, and the Navy gunboats got into position. They first fired a few shells inland at Ashby Harbor, the intended landing place, and determined that the defenders had no batteries there.

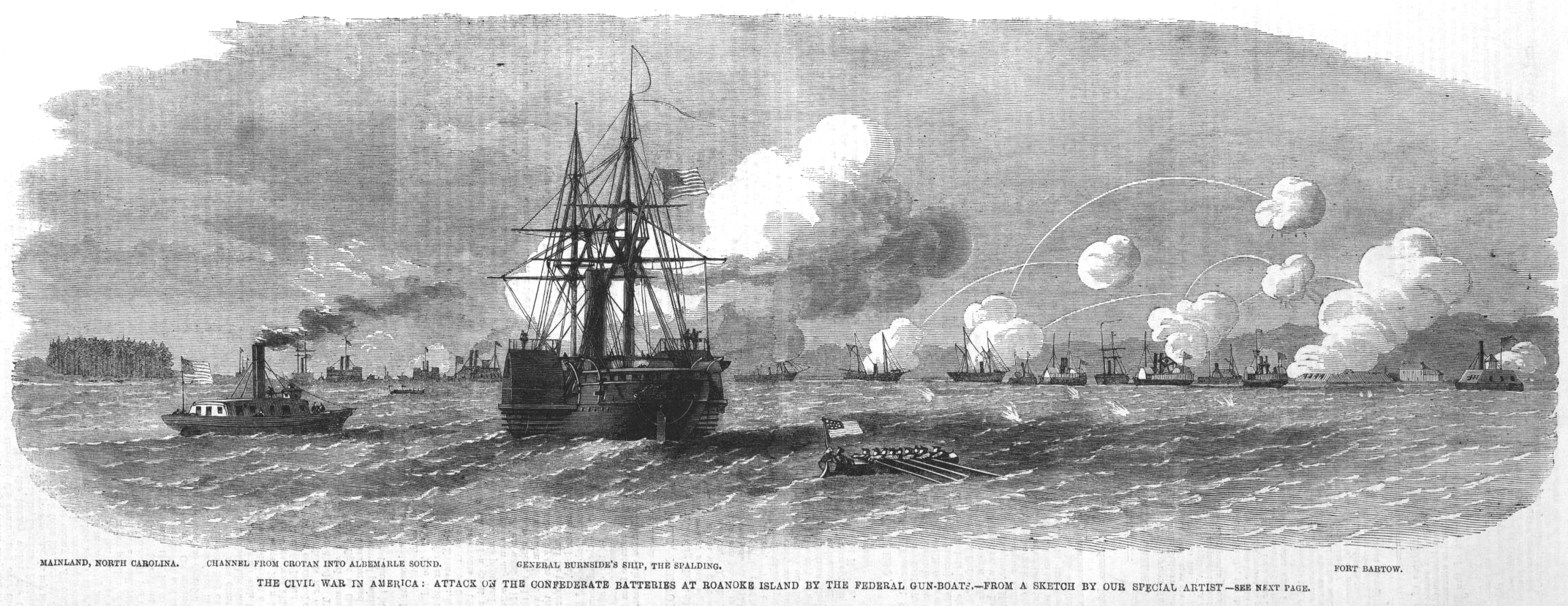
Attack on the Confederate Batteries at Roanoke Island by the Federal gun-boats; on board the Spalding were General Burnside and the war correspondent Frank Vizetelly

They then moved up Croatan Sound, where they were divided; some were ordered to fire on the fort at Pork Point (Fort Bartow), while others were to concentrate their fire on the seven vessels of the Mosquito Fleet. At about noon, the bombardment began.

The weakness of the Confederate position was revealed at this time. Only four of the guns at Fort Bartow would bear on the Union gunboats. Forts Huger and Blanchard could not contribute at all. Fort Forrest, on the other side of the sound, was rendered completely useless when gunboat CSS Curlew, holed at the waterline, ran ashore directly in front in her effort to avoid sinking, and in so doing masked the guns of the fort.

Losses were light on both sides despite the intensity of the fight. Several of the Union ships were hit, but none suffered severe damage. This was true for the Confederates also, aside from Curlew, but the remaining Mosquito Fleet had to retire simply because they ran out of ammunition.

The Army transports, accompanied by its gunboats, had in the meantime arrived at Ashby Harbor, near the midpoint of the island. At 15:00, Burnside ordered the landings to begin, and at 16:00 the troops were reaching shore. A 200-man strong Confederate force commanded by Col. John V. Jordan (31st North Carolina), in position to oppose the landing, was discovered and fired on by the gunboats; the defenders fled without any attempt to return fire. There was no further opposition. Almost all of the 10,000 men present were ashore by midnight. With the infantry went six launches with boat howitzers, commanded by a young midshipman, Benjamin H. Porter. The Union soldiers pushed inland a short distance and then went into camp for the night.

=== Second day: Union advance and Confederate surrender ===
The Federal soldiers moved out promptly on the morning of February 8, advancing north on the only road on the island. Leading was the First Brigade's 25th Massachusetts, with Midshipman Porter's howitzers immediately following. They were soon halted, when they struck the Confederate redoubt and some 400 infantry blocking their path. Another thousand Confederates were in reserve, about 250 yards (230 m) to the rear; the front was so constricted that Col. Shaw could deploy only a quarter of his men. The defensive line ended in what were deemed impenetrable swamps on both sides, so Shaw did not protect his flanks.

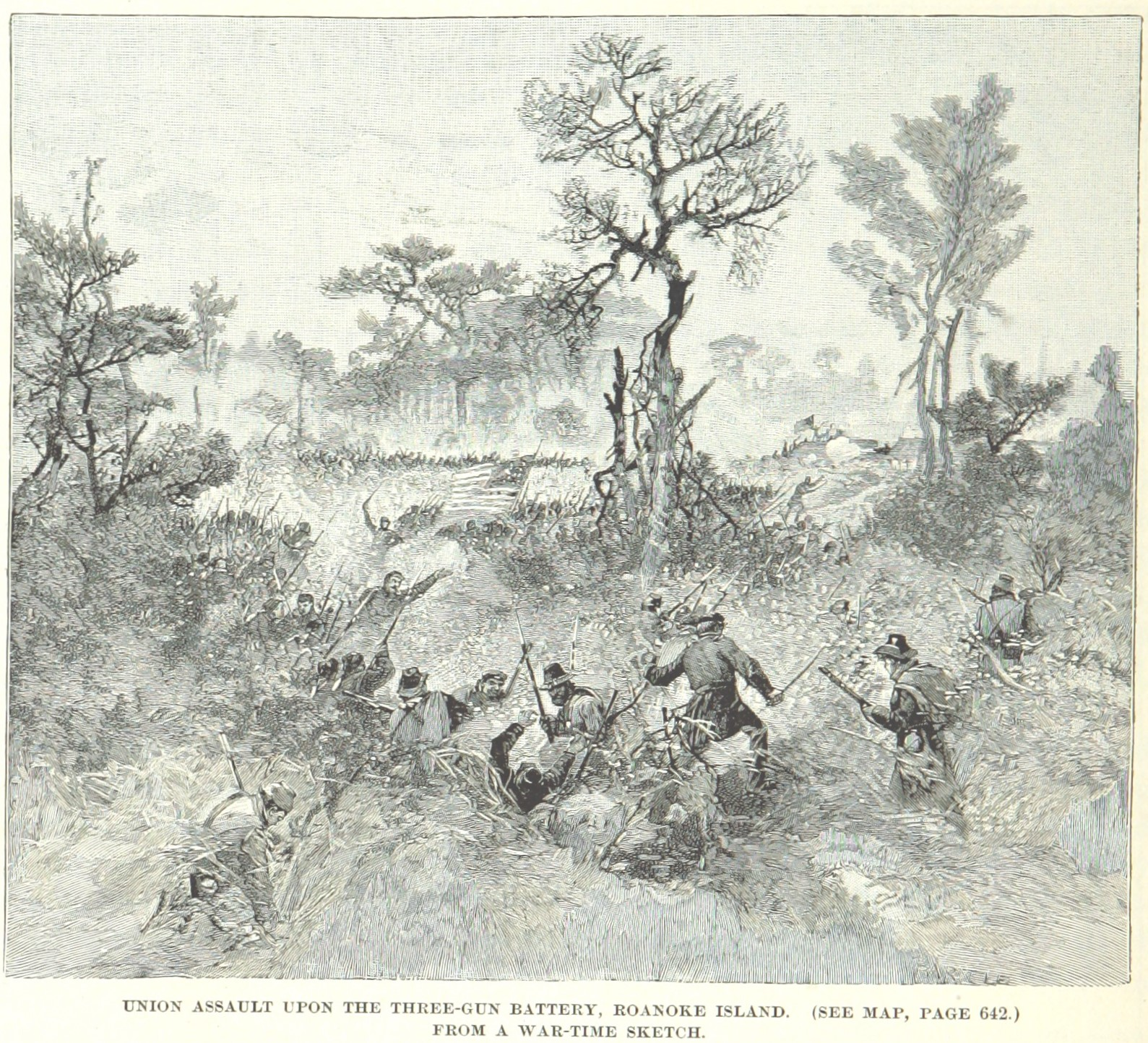
Union troops assault the Confederate three-gun battery

The leading elements of the First Brigade spread out to match their opponents' configuration, and for two hours the combatants fired at each other through blinding clouds of smoke. The 10th Connecticut relieved the exhausted, but not badly bloodied, 25th Massachusetts, but they too could not advance. No progress was made until the Second Brigade arrived, and its commander, Brig. Gen. Jesse L. Reno, ordered them to try to penetrate the "impenetrable" swamp on the Union left. Brig. Gen. John G. Foster then ordered two of his reserve regiments to do the same on the right. About this time, Brig. Gen. John G. Parke came up with the Third Brigade, and it was immediately sent to assist. Although they were not coordinated, the two flanking movements emerged from the swamp at nearly the same time. Reno ordered his 21st Massachusetts, 51st New York, and 9th New Jersey to attack. As they were firing on the Confederates, the 23rd Massachusetts, from the First Brigade, appeared on the other end of the line. The defensive line began to crack; noting this, Foster ordered his remaining forces to attack. Under assault from three sides, the Confederates broke and fled.

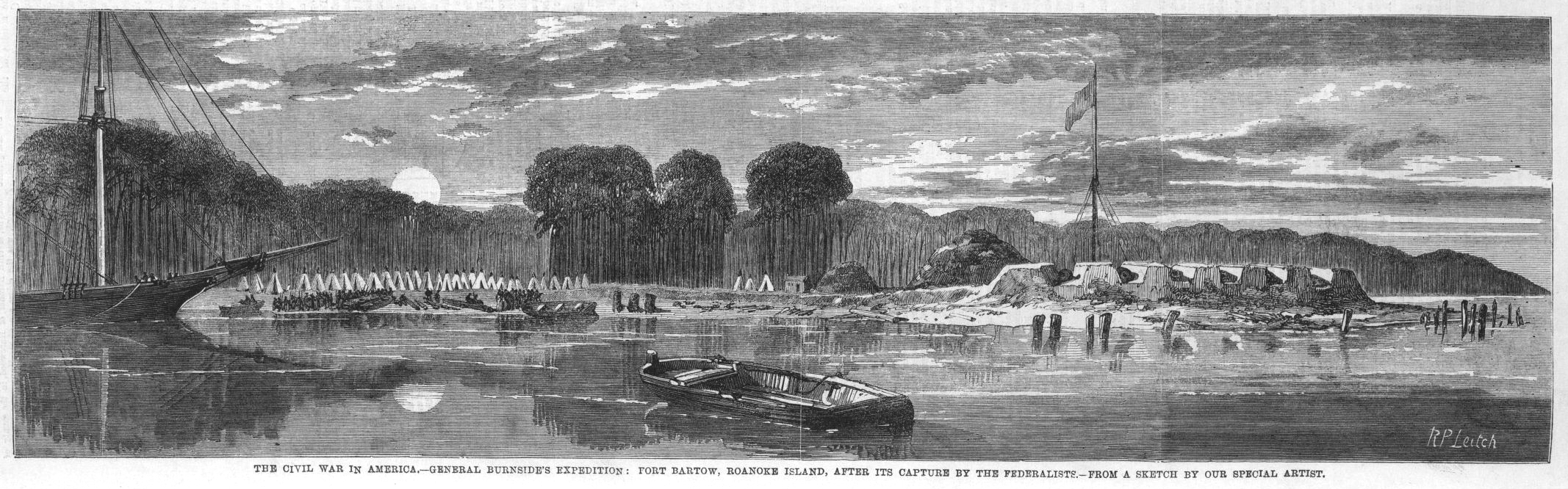
Fort Bartow, Roanoke Island, after its capture by the Federalists

As no fall-back defenses had been set up, and he was bereft of artillery, Col. Shaw surrendered to Foster. Included in the capitulation were not only the 1,400 infantry that he commanded directly, but also the guns in the forts. Two additional regiments (2nd North Carolina and 46th Virginia) had been sent as reinforcements. They arrived too late to take part in the battle, but not too late to take part in the surrender. Altogether, some 2,500 men became prisoners of war.

Aside from the men who went into captivity, casualties were rather light by American Civil War standards. The Federal forces lost 37 killed, 214 wounded, and 13 missing. The Confederates lost 23 killed, 58 wounded, and 62 missing.

== Aftermath ==
Roanoke Island remained in Union control for the rest of the war. Immediately after the battle, the Federal gunboats passed the now-silent Confederate forts into Albemarle Sound, and destroyed what was left of the Mosquito Fleet at the Battle of Elizabeth City. Burnside used the island as staging ground for later assaults on New Bern and Fort Macon, resulting in their capture. Several minor expeditions took other towns on the sounds. The Burnside Expedition ended only in July, when its leader was called to Virginia to take part in the Richmond campaign.

After Burnside left, North Carolina ceased to be an active center of the war. With only one or two exceptions, no notable military actions took place until the last days of the conflict, when the Second Battle of Fort Fisher closed Wilmington, the last open port in the Confederacy.

The Army classified the slaves on Roanoke Island as contraband and by late 1862, hundreds more escaped slaves had joined them. While Foster was commander of the Department of North Carolina, in 1863 he appointed Horace James, a Congregational chaplain, as "Superintendent of Negro Affairs for the North Carolina District", encouraging him to support the former slaves in becoming educated, growing their own food, and working. Based in New Bern, James supervised the Trent River contraband camp there, but decided to make Roanoke Island a self-sustaining colony. The Freedmen's Colony of Roanoke Island was an important model that lasted four years; it had a sawmill, established a fisheries, and by 1864 it had 2200 residents. It was overcrowded when residents reached 3900 at its peak, in part because poor soil on the island limited productivity of agriculture. Many of its people worked for the Army for wages, and more than 150 men enlisted in the United States Colored Troops. Missionary teachers recruited by the American Missionary Association taught reading and writing to classes of both children and adults. It was an important step toward citizenship for the freedmen.

== See also ==
- Burnside's North Carolina Expedition

== Notes ==
Abbreviations used in these notes:

ORA (Official records, armies): War of the Rebellion: a compilation of the official records of the Union and Confederate Armies.
ORN (Official records, navies): Official records of the Union and Confederate Navies in the War of the Rebellion.
