= CSS Ellis =

Coordinates: 34.7179°N 77.4254°W

- "The captured gunboat Ellis" (from The Long Roll)

History

Confederate States
- Name: Ellis
- Builder: Harlan & Hollingsworth, Wilmington, Delaware
- Launched: 1860
- Commissioned: 1861
- Decommissioned: 1862
- Homeport: Norfolk, Virginia
- Fate: Captured by U.S. Navy 10 February 1862; Destroyed to prevent recapture 25 November 1862

General characteristics
- Displacement: 100 tons
- Draft: 6 ft (1.8 m)
- Installed power: steam
- Propulsion: propeller
- Complement: 28 officers and men
- Armament: 1 32-pounder rifled cannon, 1 12-pounder howitzer

The 12-star "Stars and Bars" Ensign of the CSS Ellis.

CSS Ellis (later USS Ellis) was a gunboat in the Confederate States Navy and the United States Navy during the American Civil War. It was lost during a raid while under command of famed Navy officer Lieutenant William B. Cushing.

== Confederate Service ==
The Ellis was purchased at Norfolk, Virginia in 1861 by the State of North Carolina and turned over to the Confederacy when that State became a member. With Commander W. T. Muse, CSN, in command, she played an important part in the defense of Fort Hatteras and Fort Clark in Hatteras Inlet, North Carolina on August 28–29, 1861, of Roanoke Island on February 7–8, 1862, and of Elizabeth City, North Carolina on February 10, 1862; that day she was captured by the Union Army after a desperate struggle in which her commander, Lieutenant James W. Cooke, CSN, was badly wounded.

== U.S. Navy Service ==
Ellis was taken into the U.S. Navy and assigned to the North Atlantic Blockading Squadron. She was placed under the command of Lieutenant C. L. Franklin, USN, and spent her entire U.S. Navy service in the sounds and rivers of North Carolina.

Ellis took part in a combined expedition which captured Fort Macon, near Beaufort, North Carolina, on April 25, 1862. She had a brief engagement with Confederate cavalry off Winton, North Carolina on June 27, 1862, and from August 15 to 19, 1862, she made an expedition to Swansboro, North Carolina, to destroy salt works and a battery. On October 14, 1862, she was detailed to the blockade of Bogue Inlet, and a week later, captured and burned the schooner Adelaide with a valuable cargo of turpentine, cotton, and tobacco.

== Final Action ==
In November 1862, Ellis, under command of Lieutenant William B. Cushing, sailed up New River Inlet to capture Jacksonville, North Carolina. The steamer captured two schooners, some arms and mail. On her way down river, Ellis ran aground on November 24, 1862, and could not be re-floated. After dark, her commanding officer moved all the crew except six and all her equipment and supplies except her pivot gun, some ammunition, two tons of coal, and a few small arms to one of the captured schooners. While the schooners slipped down the river to wait, Cushing and five of his men remained to fight it out. Early on the morning of November 25, 1862, the Confederates opened fire on Ellis, and in a short time, Cushing was forced to decide between surrender and a pull of a mile and a half to a waiting schooner. Cushing chose not to surrender, and before leaving his ship, set fire to her in five places, leaving the gun trained on the enemy to let the ship herself carry on the fight when flames would fire the cannon. Cushing and his men reached the schooner and made for the sea, getting the vessel over the bar just in time to escape several companies of cavalry trying to cut off the schooner at the mouth of the inlet. Ellis was blown to pieces by the explosion of her magazine on the morning of November 25, 1862.

== See also ==
- Ships captured in the American Civil War
- Bibliography of American Civil War naval history
