= Mosquito Fleet =

Nautical term with a variety of meanings

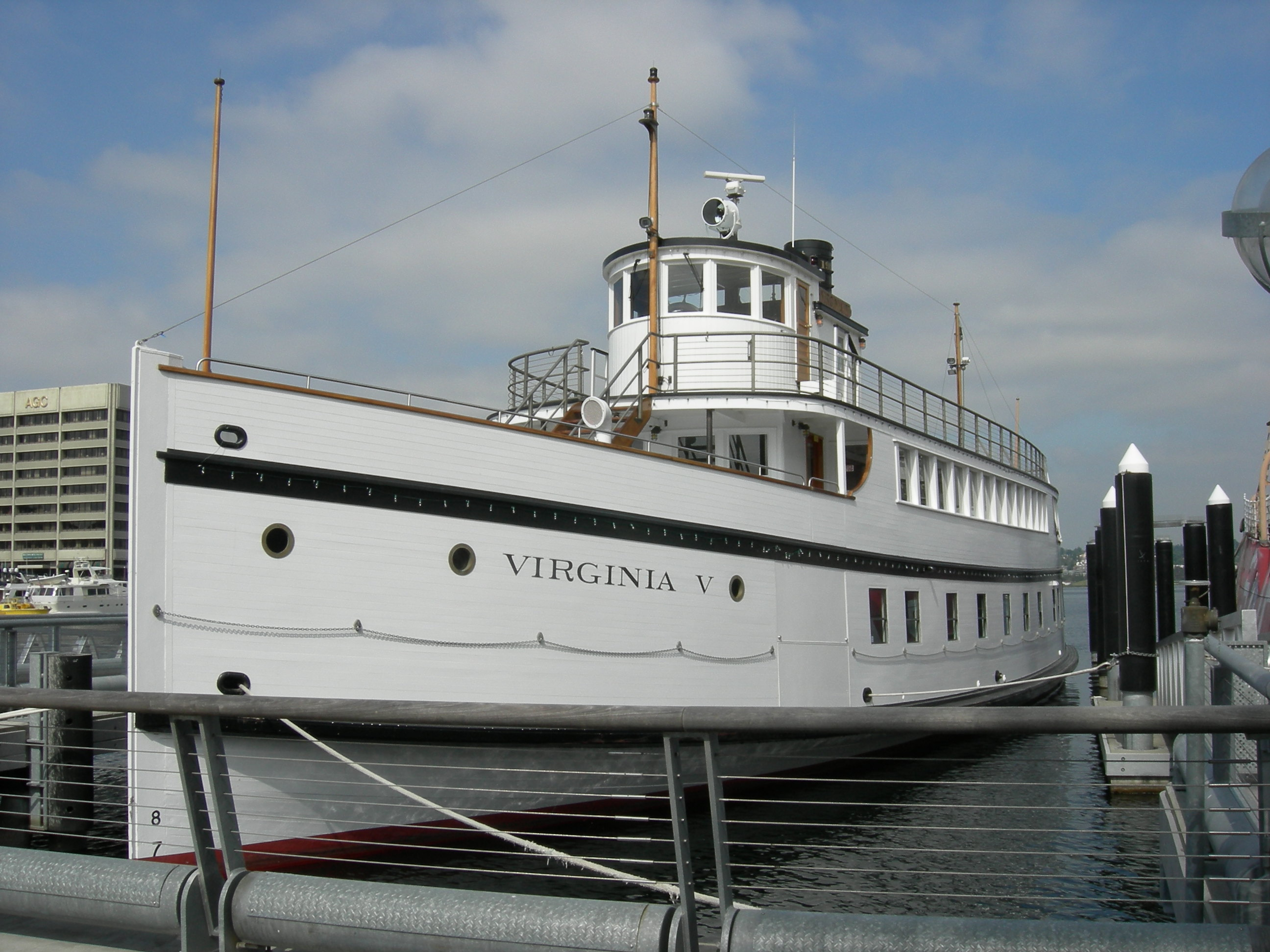
Virginia V, last of the Puget Sound Mosquito Fleet

The term Mosquito Fleet has had a variety of naval and commercial uses around the world.

== United States ==
In U.S. naval and maritime history, the term has had several meanings:

- The United States Navy's fleet of small Jeffersonian gunboats, leading up to and during the War of 1812, most were part of the New Orleans station (US Navy).
- A squadron of shallow-draft schooners sent to the West Indies under the command of Commodore David Porter to suppress piracy between 1823 and 1825, founding the West Indies Squadron.
- In the Second Seminole War, a joint Army-Navy-U.S. Revenue Marine task force in southern Florida that patrolled along the shore to intercept Bahamian and Cuban trade with the Seminoles, and made reconnaissance patrols on rivers and through the Everglades.
- The name of a United States Navy "squadron detachment", commanded by Commodore Matthew C. Perry, that fought against the Mexican fortresses at Tuxpan and Villahermosa during the Mexican–American War.
- In the American Civil War, it was the name of a group of converted gunboats originally of the North Carolina Navy, later transferred to the Confederate States Navy, that operated in and near the North Carolina Sounds from the start of the war until the Battle of Elizabeth City.
- In the American Civil War, it was the name of Commodore George Hollins River defense fleet that opposed the Union Gulf Blockade fleet in the Battle of the Head of Passes.
- A fleet of small steam vessels which plied the waters of Puget Sound during the late 19th century and early 20th century (see Washington State Ferries and Puget Sound Navigation Company). It was also used to describe the various steamboats and other small craft that served on the rivers and bays of the Oregon coast. (See Steamboats of the Oregon Coast). There was also a similar fleet on the east coast of the United States; see Sabino.
- A fleet of converted yachts used by the U.S. Navy during World War I off the Atlantic Coast of France to patrol for U-boats and provide support for convoys into Brest, France. This fleet was also called the "Suicide Fleet".
- The fast, wooden PT boat used by the U.S. Navy in World War II, with the most famous being PT-109, skippered by Lieutenant Junior Grade John F. Kennedy, a future president of the United States.
- The fleet of sailing ships that plied the waters off the coast of South Carolina and Georgia in the mid-19th century, trawling for shrimp and selling their catch in local markets; the fleet was primarily crewed by Gullah fishermen.

== South Australia ==
The term "Mosquito Fleet" also refers to the fleet of small ketches and schooners operating in the shallow coastal and gulf waters of South Australia, from 1836 to 1982.

== Queensland ==
In the early days of settlement at Geraldton (now Innisfail), the Johnstone River had a sand bar at the mouth and several shallow stretches in the river. The problem of large ships being unable to enter the river made it difficult for bags of sugar from the district sugar mills to be transported to southern refineries. To overcome this problem, shallow draft steam ships and lighters were used to carry the bags of sugar out to meet larger ships. The small ships became known as "The Mosquito Fleet".

== Iran ==
In the 21st century, the term "Mosquito Fleet" has been applied to the small, fast attack craft of the Islamic Revolutionary Guard Corps Navy (IRGC-N). These vessels—often speedboats capable of exceeding 100 knots (115 mph)—are used in asymmetric warfare "swarm" tactics to harass, board, or attack oil tankers and other commercial shipping, particularly in the Strait of Hormuz and the Persian Gulf.

Unlike Iran's conventional navy—whose larger warships were largely destroyed in the 2026 Iran war—the IRGC-N's fast boats are easily hidden in coastal caves and among civilian traffic, making them a persistent "disruptive force." The strategy originated in the 1981 - 1988 "Tanker war" of the Iran–Iraq War when Iran increasingly turned to asymmetric methods after losing larger vessels in direct confrontations with the U.S. Navy. IRGC commanders describe the fleet as the "backbone" of Iran's naval strategy, enabling high-speed, hit-and-run operations that commercial vessels are not equipped to repel.
