= CSS Sea Bird =

Steamboat

Coordinates: 36.285242°N 76.175079°W

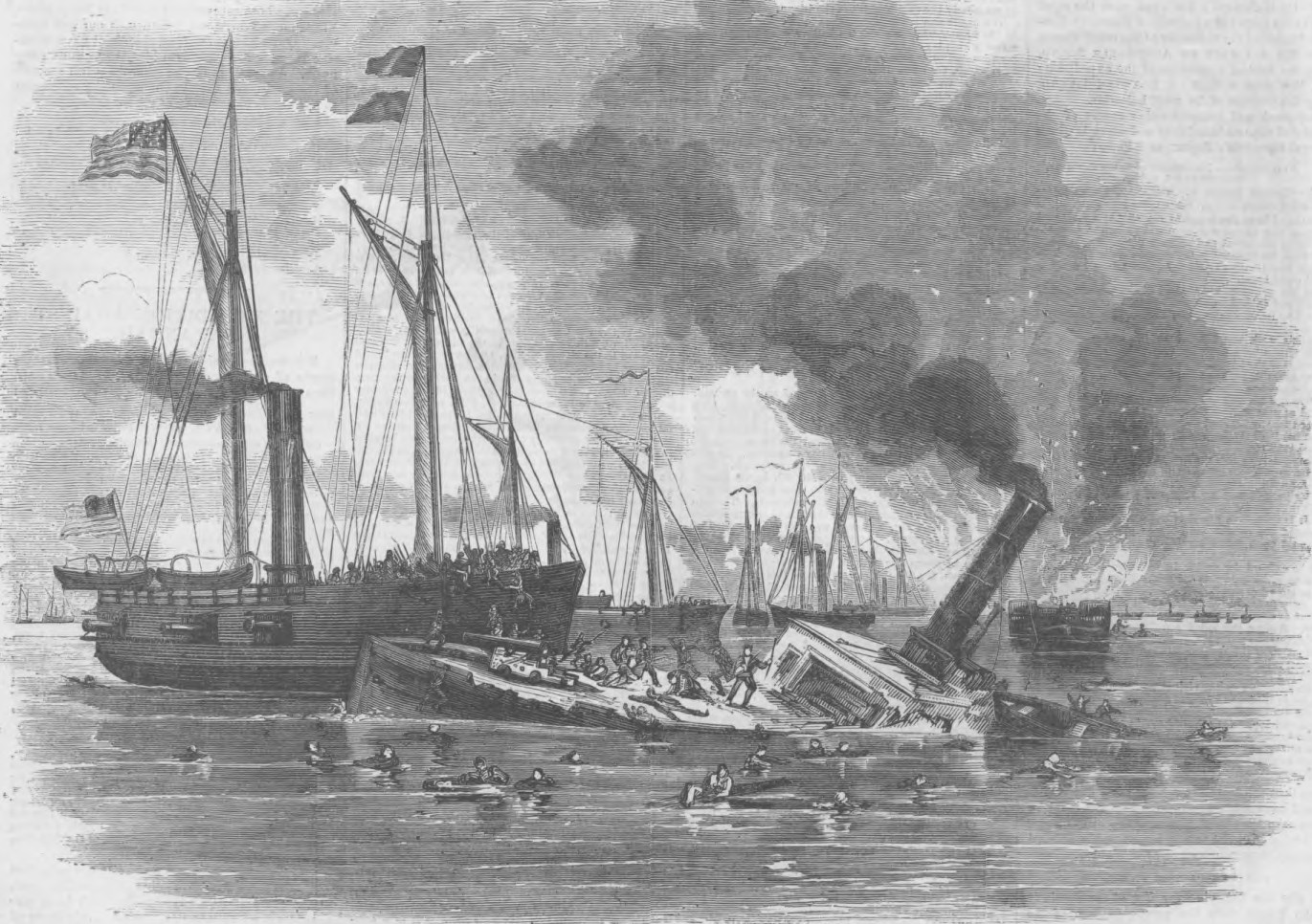
- Destruction of Commodore Lynch's fleet

History

Confederate States
- Name: CSS Sea Bird
- Owner: E. H. Delk
- Builder: Benjamin Terry
- Launched: 1854 at Keyport, New Jersey
- Commissioned: 1861
- Home port: Norfolk, Virginia
- Fate: Rammed and sunk by USS Commodore Perry February 10, 1862

General characteristics
- Displacement: 202 tons
- Length: 133 ft (41 m)
- Beam: 21 ft (6.4 m)
- Depth of hold: 7 ft (2.1 m)
- Decks: 1 deck
- Installed power: 1 low pressure 30" x 84" vertical-beam engine built by Birkbeck, Furnam & Co., NY
- Propulsion: Side wheels.
- Complement: 42 officers and men
- Armament: 1 32-pounder smoothbore cannon, 1 30-pounder rifled cannon
- Notes: No mast, round tuck, no figurehead (Information from enrollment #78; December 26, 1860).

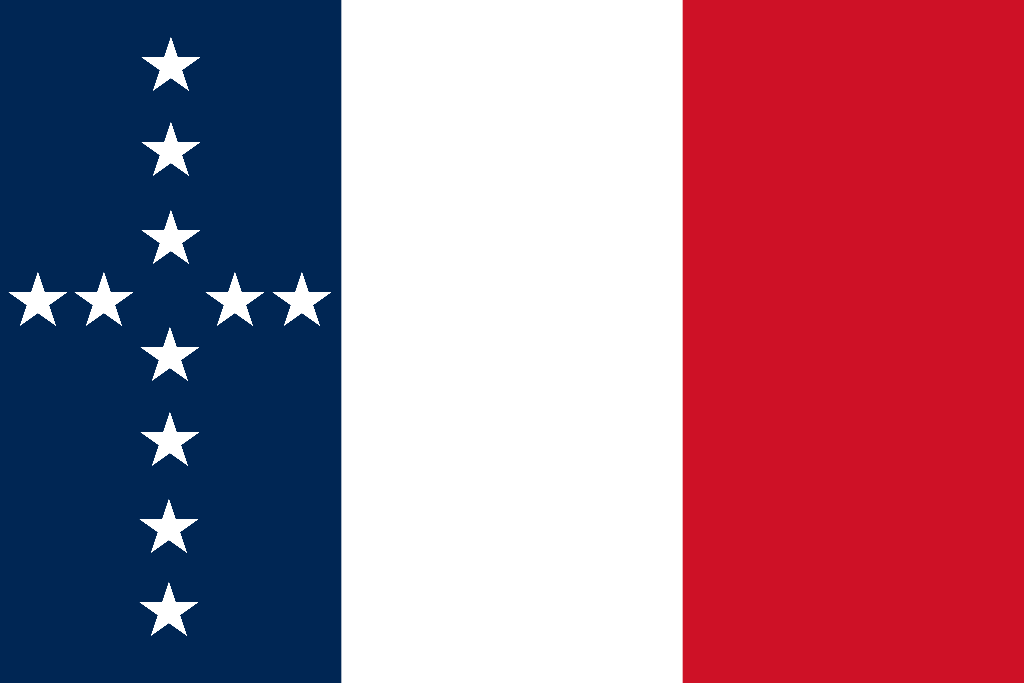
The Command flag of Captain Lynch, flown from the CSS Sea Bird

CSS Sea Bird was a sidewheel steamer in the Confederate States Navy.

Sea Bird was built at Keyport, New Jersey in 1854, was purchased by North Carolina at Norfolk, Virginia in 1861 and fitted for service with the Confederate States Navy. She was assigned to duty along the Virginia and North Carolina coasts with Lieutenant Patrick McCarrick, CSN, in command. Sea Bird served as the flagship of Confederate Flag Officer William F. Lynch's "Mosquito Fleet" during the hard-fought battles in defense of Roanoke Island on February 7–8, 1862, and Elizabeth City, North Carolina, on February 10 when she was rammed and sunk by USS Commodore Perry. Her casualties were two killed, four wounded, and the rest captured.
