= William F. Lynch =

United States Navy officer (1801–1865)

William Francis Lynch
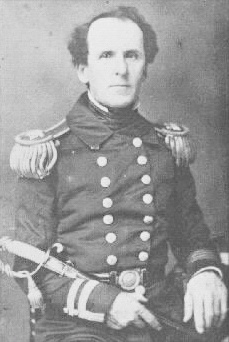
- Born: 1 April 1801; Norfolk, Virginia
- Died: 17 October 1865 (aged 64); Baltimore, Maryland
- Military career
- Allegiance: United States of America; Virginia; Confederate States of America
- Branch: United States Navy; Virginia State Navy; Confederate States Navy
- Service years: 1819-1861 (USN); 1861 (Virginia Navy); 1861-1865 (CSN)
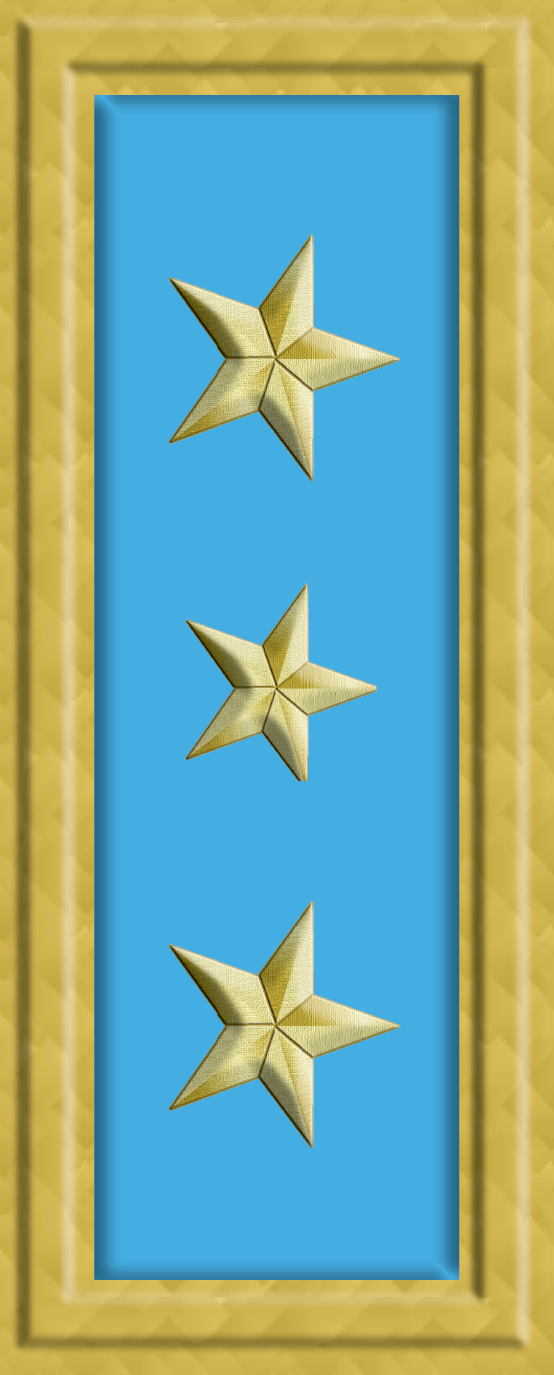
- Rank: Captain (USN) Captain (CSN)
- Conflicts: American Civil War; Battle of Aquia Creek; Battle of Roanoke Island; Battle of Fort Fisher

William Francis Lynch (1 April 1801 – 17 October 1865) was a naval officer who served in the United States Navy and later in the Confederate States Navy.

In 1848, Lynch led a 17-man expedition to study the Jordan River and the Dead Sea.The team mapped the Jordan's 27 rapids and cascades, and discovered that the river was 322 km. (200 miles) long, albeit with many twists and turns.

== Personal life ==
William F. Lynch was born in Virginia. On 2 June 1828, one month after his promotion to lieutenant, Lynch was married in New Haven, Connecticut, to Virginia Shaw, the youngest daughter of a senior navy officer and sister-in-law of another. They had two children, but separated in the 1840s and divorced in 1850s.

== Early Navy service ==
He was appointed a midshipman 26 January 1819, and first saw service with the USS Congress and next with the schooner USS Shark under Lieutenant Matthew C. Perry. Subsequent service included duty with Commodore David Porter's "Mosquito Squadron" in the West Indies and in the Mediterranean.

== Middle East operations ==
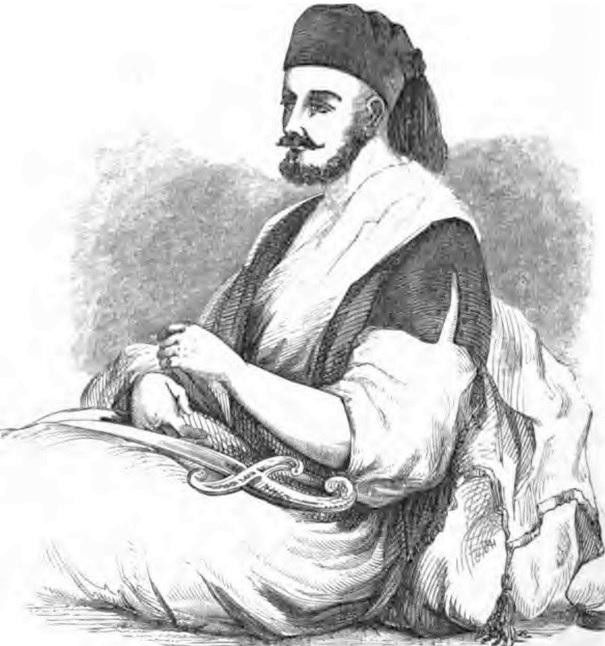
Aqil Agha, drawn by Lynch

Lynch had his first command, the Poinsett, from 3 March to 30 December 1839. The ship sailed on behalf of the United States Naval Hydrographic Office. In 1847, he proceeded to the Jordan River, transporting overland, by camels, a copper and a galvanized iron boat. A total of 16 men were a part of the trip, including John Y. Mason. Each boat was "assembled" and then placed on a carriage. His expedition ended with the exploration of the River Jordan and the Dead Sea.

Using the triangulation method, Lynch's expedition was the first to determine that the Dead Sea was below sea level, something that the scientific community had inferred but not previously determined conclusively, though several other expeditions by Europeans had attempted to do so. The American expedition's measurement showed the Dead Sea to be 1312.7 ft. (400 metres) below sea level.

He published his travels in 1849, Narrative of the United States' Expedition to the River Jordan and the Dead Sea.

In 1849 he was commissioned commander and in 1850 was promoted to captain. In 1852, he requested permission to explore the interior of Africa for purposes of possible colonization. In his exploration in west central Africa, he caught a fever, and was forced to return to the United States. Lynch believed that explorers who "remove the obstruction to Commerce, Civilization and Christianity will become the benefactors of mankind."

== American Civil War ==
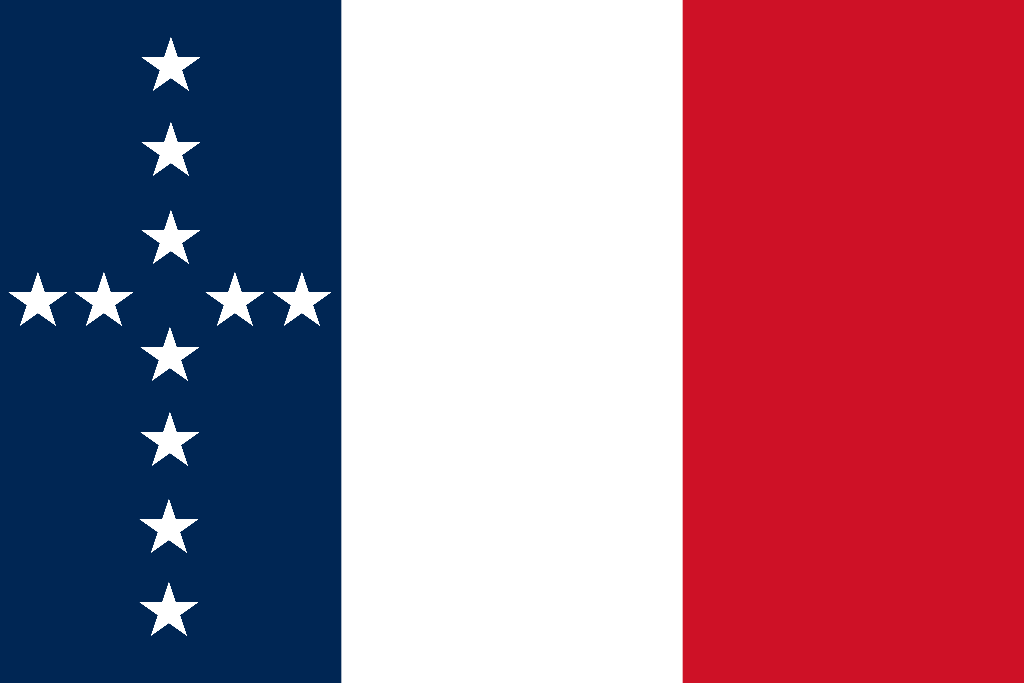
The Command flag of Captain William F. Lynch, flew as the ensign of his flagship, the CSS Seabird, 1862

After Virginia seceded from the United States on 17 April 17, 1861, he resigned from the United States Navy on 21 April. Lynch was initially appointed captain in the Virginia Navy and when Virginia joined the Confederate States of America and merged its military, he became a captain in the Confederate States Navy on 10 June 1861. He commanded naval batteries at Aquia Creek, Virginia, during their shelling by Union gunboats in May 1861; was in charge of gunboats and the defense of Roanoke Island, North Carolina in February 1862; and led Confederate naval forces at Vicksburg, Mississippi from March to October 1862. He was also assigned to the Department of the Navy offices as the Chief of the Bureau of Orders and Details during 1862.

Later in command of ships in North Carolina waters, he commanded southern naval forces during the Union attack on Fort Fisher, in December 1864 and January 1865.

== Post-war retirement ==
After the defeat of the Confederacy, he was paroled 3 May 1865 in Richmond, Virginia. He died in Baltimore, Maryland, on 17 October of the same year.

== Namesake ==
The USNS Lynch (T-AGOR-7) was named after Lynch.

== See also ==
- Christopher Costigan – explored the River Jordan and the Dead Sea in 1835
- John MacGregor – explored the River Jordan and the Dead Sea in 1869
