= Thomas Tingey Craven =

Thomas Tingey Craven may refer to:

- Thomas Tingey Craven (admiral, born 1808) (1808–1887), United States Navy officer who served in the Civil War
- Thomas Tingey Craven (admiral, born 1873) (1873–1950), United States Navy officer who served in World War I and World War II, grandson of the above
