= CSS Winslow =

American Civil War gunboat

History

Confederate States
- Name: Winslow
- Operator: North Carolina, later Confederate States Navy
- Builder: B. C. Terry, New York City
- Launched: 1846
- Commissioned: 1861 for military service
- Fate: Wrecked and burned, November 7, 1861

General characteristics
- Type: Sidewheel steamer
- Tonnage: 207 tons
- Armament: 1 32-pounder gun, 1 6-pounder rifled gun

CSS Winslow was a sidewheel steamer that was used as a gunboat in the early stages of the American Civil War. launched in 1846 as Joseph E. Coffee or J. E. Coffee, the vessel was used in the coastal merchant trade. In 1861, she was purchased at Norfolk, Virginia, and was equipped as a military vessel by the state government of North Carolina. Known as Winslow or Warren Winslow in military service, the vessel took part in commerce raiding against Union shipping, capturing 16 vessels from May to August 1861. In July, she was transferred from serving for the state of North Carolina to the Confederate States Navy. During the Battle of Forts Hatteras and Clark on August 28, Winslow landed reinforcements for Confederate-held Fort Hatteras, and then evacuated survivors the next day, with the Union gaining control of the position. As part of an operation to rescue the crew of the wrecked French corvette Prony, Winslow struck the wreck of a lightship on November 7. The Confederates rescued Winslow's crew and burned the wreck.

== Service history ==
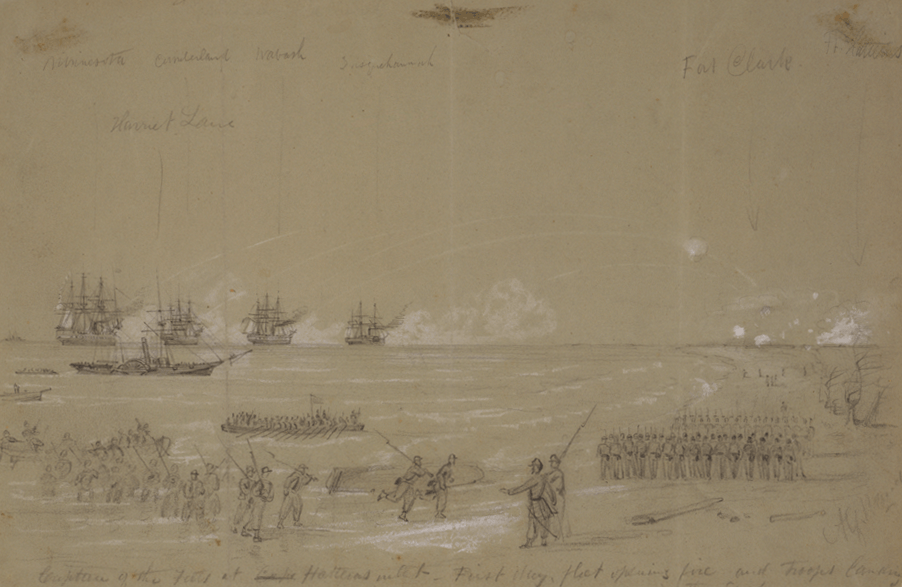
1861 illustration of the bombardment of Forts Hatteras and Clark

Winslow, which was originally known as Joseph E. Coffee or J. E. Coffee, was launched in 1846 at New York City. She had been built at the B. C. Terry yard. A sidewheel steamer, Joseph E. Coffee had a tonnage of 207 tons. Her first home port was New York City, and she was used in the coastal merchant trade. The Dictionary of American Naval Fighting Ships (DANFS) describes her as a river steamer, and notes that she had at least at one point been associated with Norfolk, Virginia. After the secession of North Carolina in May 1861, she was purchased and converted for military service in the American Civil War. The purchase took place at Norfolk. As a military vessel, she became known as Winslow or Warren Winslow.

Winslow became part of the small North Carolina Navy, which was also known as the Mosquito Fleet. All of the vessels of the Mosquito Fleet were converted civilian ships, of which Winslow was the fastest in its military form. While the other ships were only armed with a single cannon, Winslow was armed with both a 32-pounder gun and a 6-pounder rifled cannon. The 32-pounder was positioned at the front of the vessel, with the other cannon on the afterdeck. The first of the North Carolina vessels to enter operational military service, Winslow was commanded by Lieutenant Thomas M. Crossan. She served along the North Carolina coast.

Along with two other North Carolina vessels, the converted civilian vessels Beaufort and Raleigh, Winslow took part in commerce raiding against Union shipping. Winslow captured five merchant vessels during May and June. The historian William R. Trotter names four of these vessels: the brigs Lydia Francis and Hannah White (who was a blockade runner captured by the Union Navy and then recaptured by Winslow), the bark Linwood, and the schooner Herbert Manton. Hannah White and Herbert Manton had been loaded with molasses, Linwood with coffee, and Lydia Francis with sugar. In July, the ships of the North Carolina Navy were transferred to serve with the Confederate States Navy.

After her transfer to the Confederacy, Winslow continued to raid commerce near Hatteras and New Bern. She captured her last prize on August 20. According to the historian John G. Barrett, Winslow captured a total of 16 vessels during her service. The naval historian Paul H. Silverstone lists five prizes taken by Winslow: Mary Alice and Priscilla in July, Transit on July 15, Herbert on July 18, and Itasca on August 4. At the Battle of Forts Hatteras and Clark on August 28 and 29, Winslow was present and came under Union fire. Late on the first day, Winslow joined other Confederate vessels in landing reinforcements for Confederate-held Fort Hatteras, including Commodore Samuel Barron, the Confederate commander. When the fort fell to Union forces, Winslow and the gunboat CSS Ellis were able to evacuate some of the survivors. Barrett describes the number of men that could be evacuated as "a few", while the DANFS describes the evacuees as "many wounded and refugees". The survivors were taken to Goldsboro, North Carolina.

On November 5, the French corvette Prony ran aground at Ocracoke Inlet. Ships from the Union blockade attempted to rescue her crew, but were unable to do so due to weather and ocean conditions. The lightship at Beacon Island had previously been burned by the Union. Several Confederate vessels instead came to the rescue of Prony, including Winslow. Winslow struck the wreck of the lightship and sank. The historian Fred M. Mallison states that the rescue of Prony occurred on November 6, while Silverstone, DANFS, and the historian W. Craig Gaines note that Winslow ran aground on November 7. Her crew was rescued by Ellis and Beaufort, after which the wrecks of Winslow and Prony were burned.

== Sources ==
- Barrett, John G. (1963). The Civil War in North Carolina. Chapel Hill, North Carolina: University of North Carolina Press. ISBN 0-8078-4520-5.
- Gaines, W. Craig (2008). Encyclopedia of Civil War Shipwrecks. Baton Rouge, Louisiana: Louisiana State University Press. ISBN 978-0-8071-3274-6.
- Lytle, William M. (1952). Merchant Steam Vessels of the United States 1807–1868. Mystic, Connecticut: The Steamship Historical Society of America. OCLC 7195533.
- Mallison, Fred M. (1998). The Civil War on the Outer Banks: A History of the Late Rebellion Along the Coast of North Carolina from Carteret to Currituck, with Comments on Prewar Conditions and an Account of Postwar Recovery. Jefferson, North Carolina: McFarland & Co. ISBN 0-7864-0417-5.
- Official Records of the Union and Confederate Navies in the War of the Rebellion, Series 2. Vol. 1. Washington, D.C.: Government Printing Office. 1921. OCLC 5194016.
- Silverstone, Paul H. (1989). Warships of the Civil War Navies. Annapolis, Maryland: Naval Institute Press. ISBN 0-87021-783-6.
- Trotter, William R. (1989). Ironclads and Columbiads: The Civil War in North Carolina: The Coast. Winston-Salem, North Carolina: John F. Blair. ISBN 0-89587-088-6.
