= Max Weber (general) =

German American military officer, hotelier and tax collector

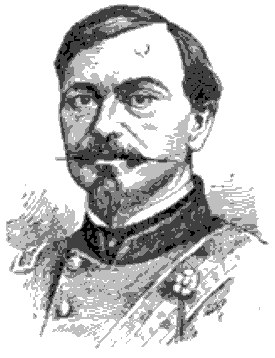
- Born: August 27, 1824; Achern, Baden
- Died: June 15, 1901 (aged 76); Brooklyn, New York, U.S.
- Burial place: The Evergreens Cemetery, Brooklyn, New York
- Military career
- Allegiance: Baden; United States (Union)
- Branch: Baden Army; United States Army (Union Army)
- Service years: 1861–1865
- Rank: Brigadier General
- Conflicts: American Civil War; Battle of Hatteras Inlet Batteries; Battle of Antietam (WIA)

Max Weber (August 27, 1824 – June 15, 1901) was a military officer in the armies of the Grand Duchy of Baden in Germany and later the United States, most known for serving as a brigadier general in the Union Army during the American Civil War.

== Biography ==
Born in Achern, in the German state of Baden, Weber graduated from the military school at Karlsruhe in 1843, and served as an infantry lieutenant in the Grand Duke's army. In 1849, during the Revolutions of 1848, he served with the revolutionaries under Franz Sigel. He emigrated to America, one of a large group of political refugees who came to be as known as the Forty-Eighters. He settled in New York City and worked as proprietor of the Konstanz Hotel in New York.

Weber enlisted to fight in the Civil War as a colonel on May 16, 1861. He raised a German-American unit known as the "Turner Rifles," a company that eventually became a part of the 20th New York Infantry. Weber was stationed at Fort Monroe in Virginia. He took part in the capture of Fort Hatteras. From September 1861 until May 1862, he commanded Camp Hamilton, near Fort Monroe, being commissioned brigadier general of volunteers on April 28, 1862. He was at Newport News during the Battle of the Monitor and Merrimack in anticipation of a Confederate attack by land. He took part in the capture of Norfolk, Virginia in May, and then commanded at Suffolk until September, when he was ordered to the Army of the Potomac, where he commanded the Third Brigade, Third Division, Second Army Corps.

Weber's brigade was the first to attack the Sunken Road during the Battle of Antietam. His right arm was grievously wounded in the ill-fated attack on the Confederate positions. The injury forced Weber off to a series of desk assignments for the duration of the conflict. He served on administrative duty in Washington, D.C. in 1863. He served under Gen. David Hunter and Gen. Franz Sigel in the Shenandoah Valley in 1864. He was the garrison commander of Harpers Ferry and repelled Jubal A. Early's July 4–7 raid.

Weber resigned his commission on May 13, 1865. After the war, he was assessor of internal revenue in New York in 1870-72, and then collector until April 1883, when he resigned. Weber served as U.S. consul in Nantes, France.

He died at his home in Brooklyn on June 15, 1901.

== See also ==
- List of American Civil War generals (Union)
- German Americans in the Civil War
