= Charles Craven (disambiguation) =

Charles Craven was a colonial governor of South Carolina.

Charles Craven may also refer to:

- Charles H. Craven (1843–1898), U.S. Navy officer
- Charlie Craven (1909–1972), English footballer
- Sir Charles Craven, 1st Baronet (1884–1944), of the Craven baronets
