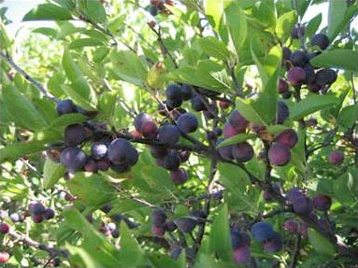

Conservation status
- Data Deficient (IUCN 3.1)

Scientific classification
- Kingdom: Plantae
- Clade: Tracheophytes
- Clade: Angiosperms
- Clade: Eudicots
- Clade: Rosids
- Order: Rosales
- Family: Rosaceae
- Genus: Prunus
- Subgenus: Prunus subg. Prunus
- Section: Prunus sect. Prunocerasus
- Species: P. maritima

Binomial name
- Prunus maritima Marshall

Synonyms
- Prunus acuminata Hook.f.; Prunus acuminata Michx.; Prunus gravesii Small; Prunus maritima var. gravesii (Small) G.J.Anderson; Prunus declinata Marsh.; Prunus lancifolia Clav.; Prunus littoralis Bigel.; Prunus poiretiana Heynh.; Prunus pubescens Pursh; Prunus pygmaea Willd.; Prunus reclinata Bosc ex Spach; Prunus sphaerica Willd.

= Prunus maritima =

Species of tree

Prunus maritima, the beach plum, is a species of plum native to the East Coast of the United States. It is grown commercially for its fruit and resists certain pests.

== Description ==
Prunus maritima is a deciduous shrub, in its natural sand dune habitat growing 1–2 meters (3 1/2–6 1/2 feet) tall, although it can grow larger, up to 4 m (13 ft) tall. The leaves are alternate, elliptical, 3–7 centimeters (1 1/4–2 3/4 inches) long and 2–4 cm (3/4–1 1/2 in) broad, with a sharply toothed margin. They are green on top and pale below, becoming showy red or orange in the autumn.

Blooming from mid-May to June, the flowers are 1–1.5 cm (3/8–5/8 in) in diameter, with five white petals and large yellow anthers. Ripening from August to early September, the fruit is a drupe, 1.5–2 cm (5/8–3/4 in) in diameter in the wild plant, and colored red, yellow, blue, or nearly black.

== Taxonomy ==
The species was first described by Marshall in 1785 as Prunus maritima, the "Sea side Plumb". A few sources cite Wangenheim as the author, though Wangenheim's publication dates to 1787, two years later than Marshall's.

A plant with rounded leaves, of which only a single specimen has ever been found in the wild, has been described as P. maritima var. gravesii (Small) G.J.Anderson, though its taxonomic status is questionable, and it may be better considered a cultivar P. maritima 'Gravesii'. The original plant, found in Connecticut, died in the wild in about 2000, but it is maintained in cultivation from rooted cuttings.

== Distribution and habitat ==
The species can be found from Maine south to Maryland. Although sometimes listed as extending north to Canada's New Brunswick, the species is not known from collections there and does not appear in the most authoritative works on the flora of that province.

The plant is salt tolerant and cold hardy. It prefers the full sun and well-drained soil. It spreads roots by putting out suckers but in coarse soil puts down a taproot. In dunes it is often partly buried in drifting sand.

== Conservation ==
The species is endangered in Maine, where it is in serious decline due to commercial development of its beach habitats.

== Toxicity ==
The seed pits of the fruits are toxic due to their hydrocyanic acid content.

== Uses ==
The species is grown commercially for fruit and value-added products like jam. Taste of ripe fruit is prevailingly sweet, though individual bushes range in flavor and some are sour or slightly bitter. About the size of grapes, beach plums are much smaller in size when compared to the longer cultivated Asian varieties found in the supermarket, though are resilient to many North American stone fruit pests, such as black knot fungus. A number of cultivars have been selected for larger and better-flavored fruit, including Resigno, Jersey Gem (Rutgers), ECOS, Eastham, Hancock and Squibnocket.

Natali Vineyards in Goshen, New Jersey, produces a wine from beach plums. Greenhook Ginsmiths in Greenpoint, Brooklyn, New York, makes a gin flavored with beach plums.

Fresh and dried, beach plums were used extensively by Native Americans and eventually colonists. The beach plum is experiencing a revival in popularity with the resurgence of foraging, the local food movement, the La Croix flavor, and the prominence of native species selection in permaculture design.

== In culture ==
Places named after the beach plum include Plum Island, Massachusetts, Plum Island, New York, Plum Cove Beach in Lanesville, Gloucester, Massachusetts, and Beach Plum Island State Park in Sussex County, Delaware.

== Gallery ==
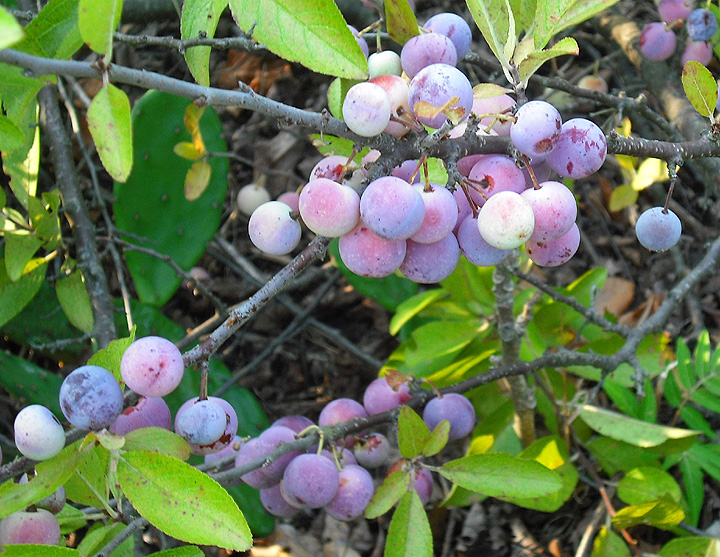
Ripe beach plums at the North Beach area of Sandy Hook, New Jersey

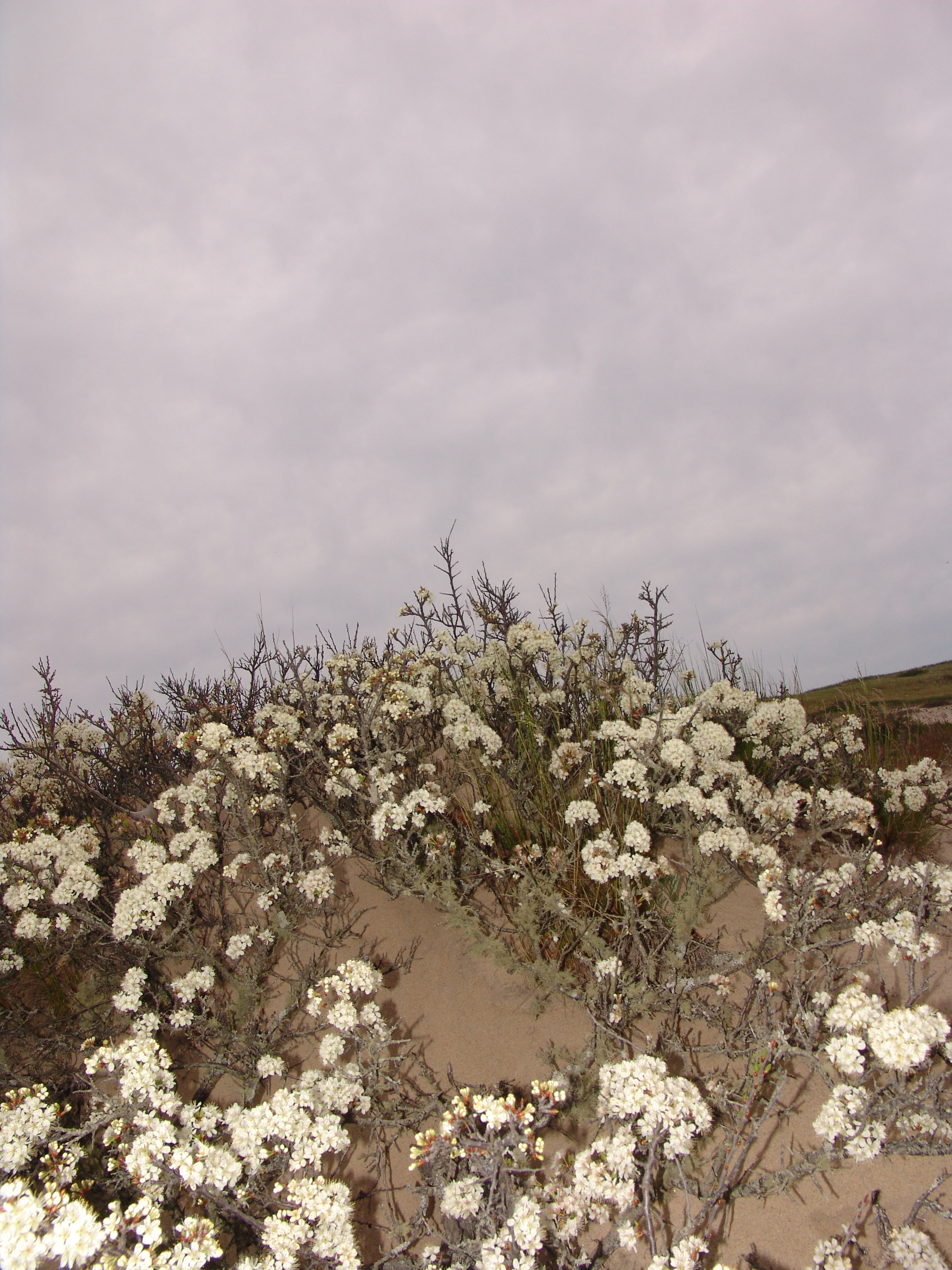
Beach plum blooms at Cape Cod National Seashore, Massachusetts

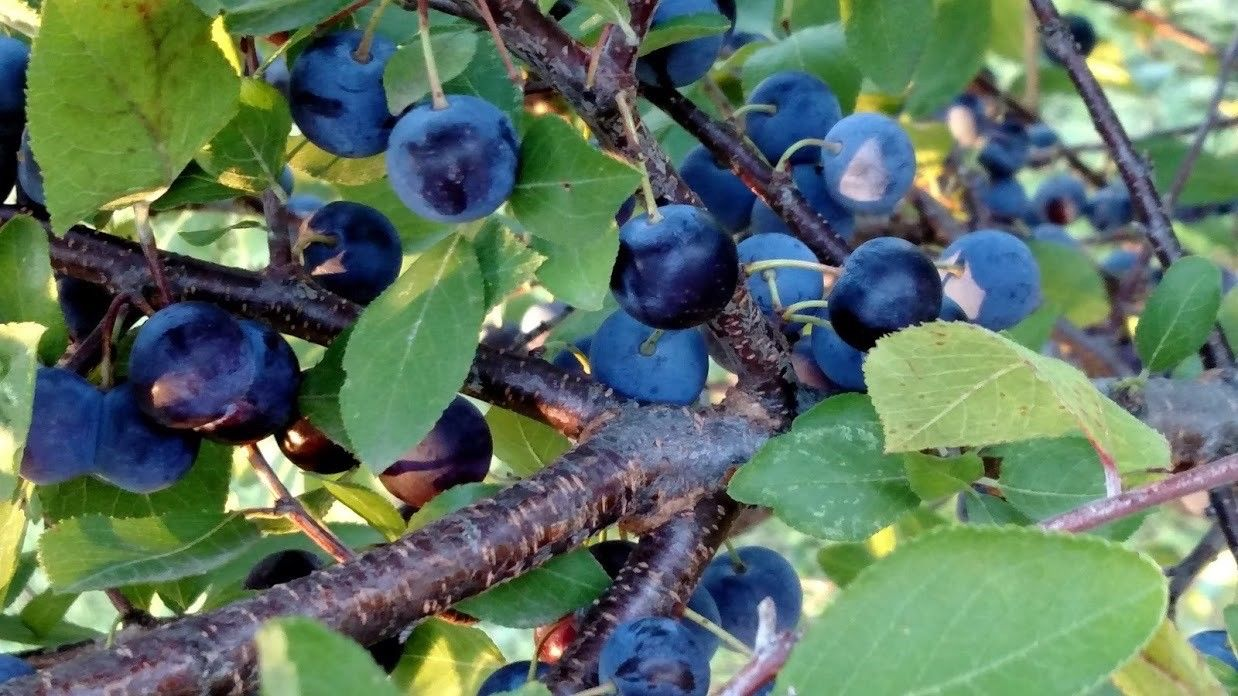
Resigno Cultivar in Philadelphia garden, Pennsylvania

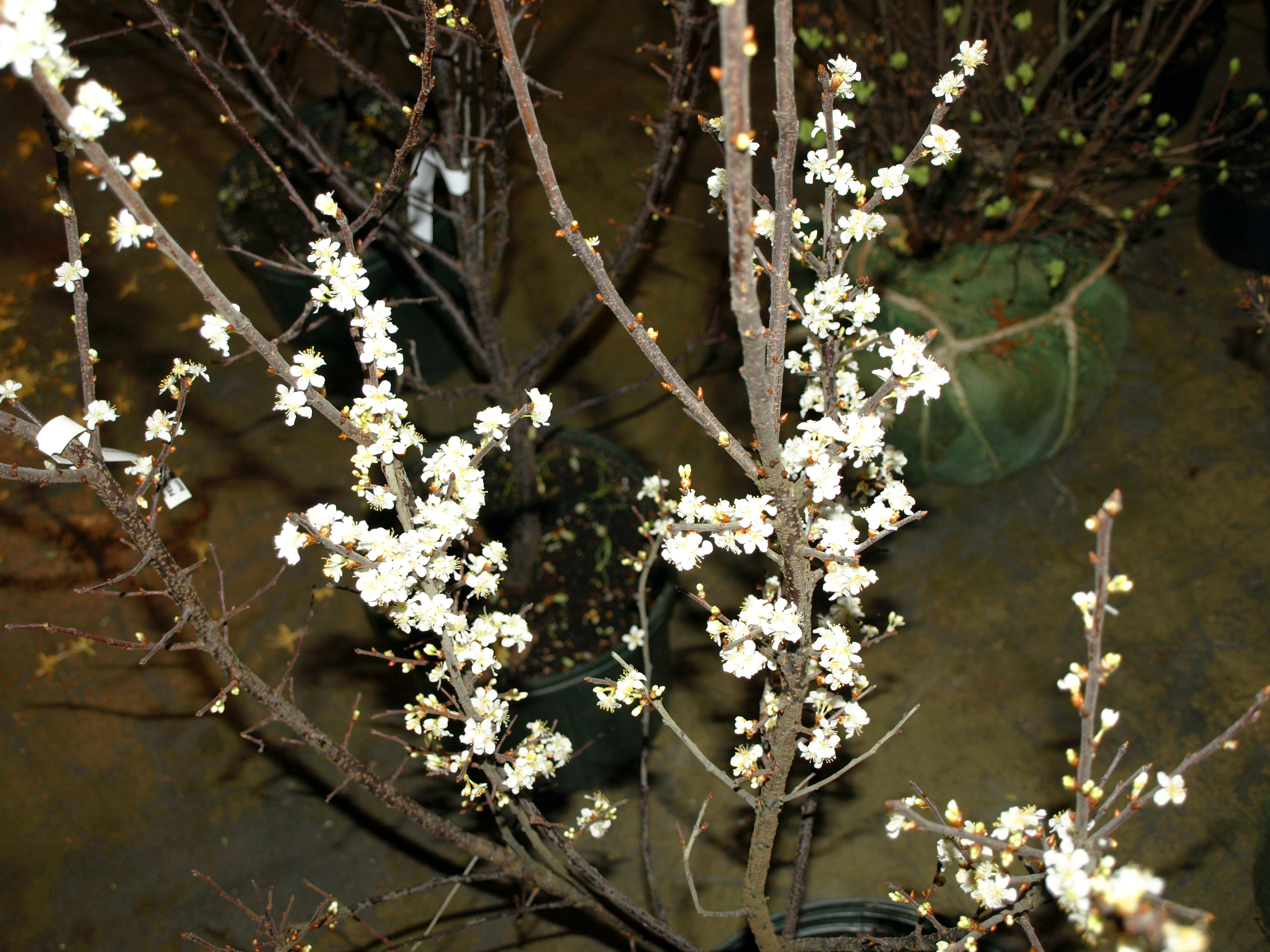
Beach plums in early stages of bloom

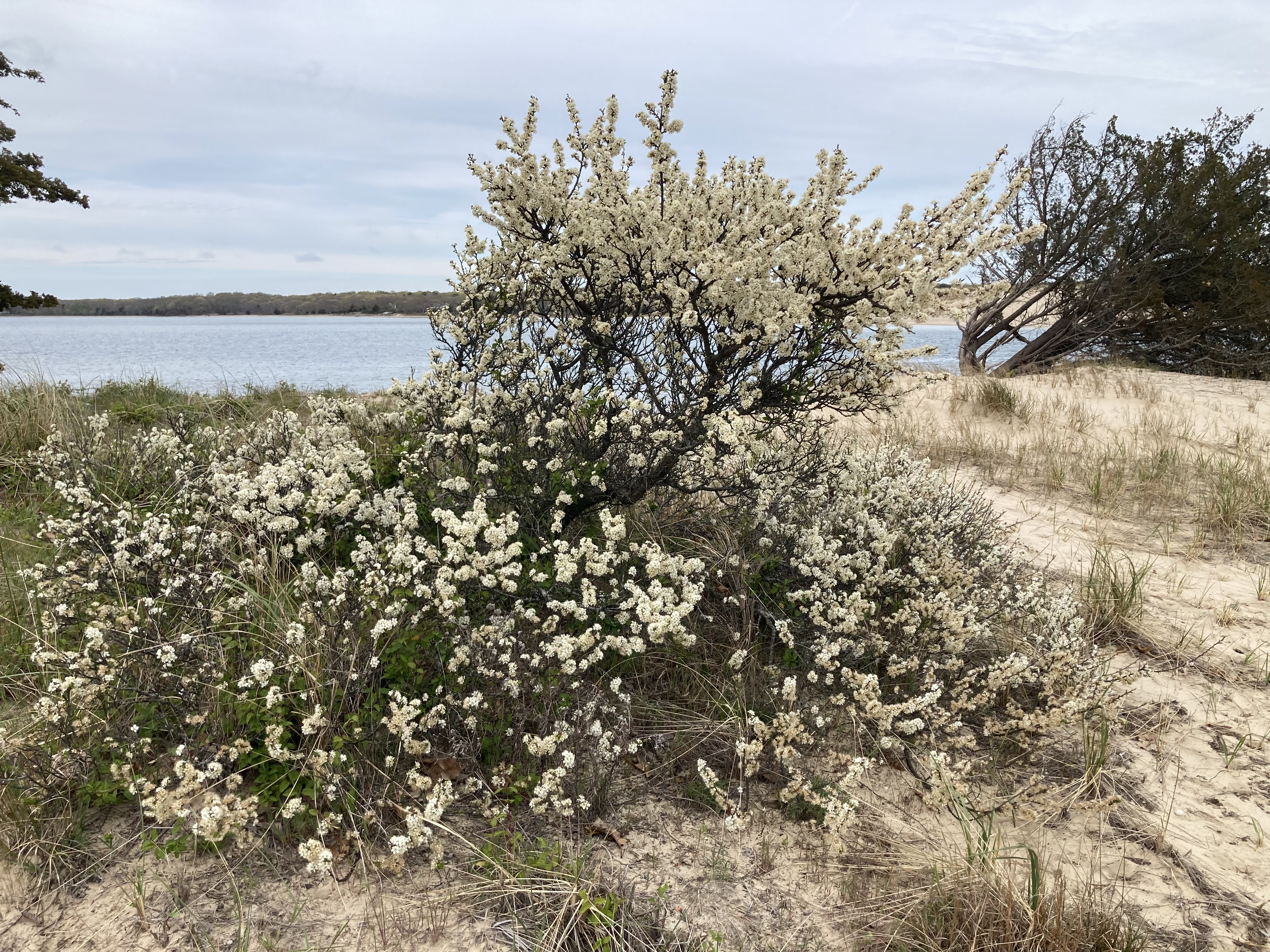
A Beach Plum on the eastern end of Long Island.
