= Samuel Mercer =

American naval officer (1799-1862)

- Born: 1799; Maryland, U.S.
- Died: March 6, 1862 (aged 62–63); Philadelphia, Pennsylvania, U.S.
- Burial place: Laurel Hill Cemetery, Philadelphia, Pennsylvania, U.S.
- Military career
- Allegiance: United States
- Branch: U.S. Navy
- Service years: 1815–1862
- Rank: Captain
- Units: USS Lawrence; USS Powhatan; USS Wabash
- Conflicts: Mexican–American War; American Civil War; Battle of Hatteras Inlet Batteries

Samuel Mercer (1799 – March 6, 1862) was an American officer in the United States Navy who commanded the USS Lawrence during the Mexican–American War and the USS Powhatan and the USS Wabash during the American Civil War.

== Early life ==
Mercer was born in 1799 in Maryland. On March 4, 1815, he received a midshipman's warrant in the United States Navy. He received a promotion to lieutenant on January 13, 1825 and to commander on September 8, 1841.

== Mexican–American War ==
He commanded the USS Lawrence in the Home Squadron as tensions escalated in the Gulf of Mexico prior to the Mexican-American War. He and his crew spent the next year cruising along the Gulf Coast, providing security to American shipping in the region and helping suppress piracy. After war broke out April 25, 1846, they cruised on a blockade station off the Mexican coast, remaining there until June 17. He was promoted to captain on September 14, 1855.

== Civil War ==
Mercer commanded the USS Powhatan and was ordered on April 5, 1861 by the Secretary of the Navy, Gideon Welles, to provision Fort Sumter in Charleston Harbor, South Carolina as the squadron commander of the USS Pawnee, USS Pocahontas and the USRC Harriet Lane under Gustavus Fox. However, on April 6, President Lincoln overrode the order, placed Lieutenant David Dixon Porter in command of the Powhatan and ordered him to reinforce Fort Pickens in Pensacola, Florida instead. A telegram reversing the order and returning command to Mercer was issued, however the Powhatan was already under way and Porter ignored the order and continued to Pensacola.

On 16 May 1861 Mercer took command of the newly recommissioned USS Wabash as the flagship of the Atlantic Blockading Squadron under rear admiral Silas H. Stringham. Under Mercer's command, the Wabash captured the brigantine Sarah Starr in the waters near Charleston, South Carolina on August 3, 1861. He recaptured the American schooner Mary Alice which had been captured by the CSS Dixie. He also captured the brigantines Hannah, Balch and Solferino and took 22 Confederate sailors as prisoners. Mercer led the Wabash during the Battle of Hatteras Inlet Batteries. In October, 1861, the Wabash returned to port for repairs.

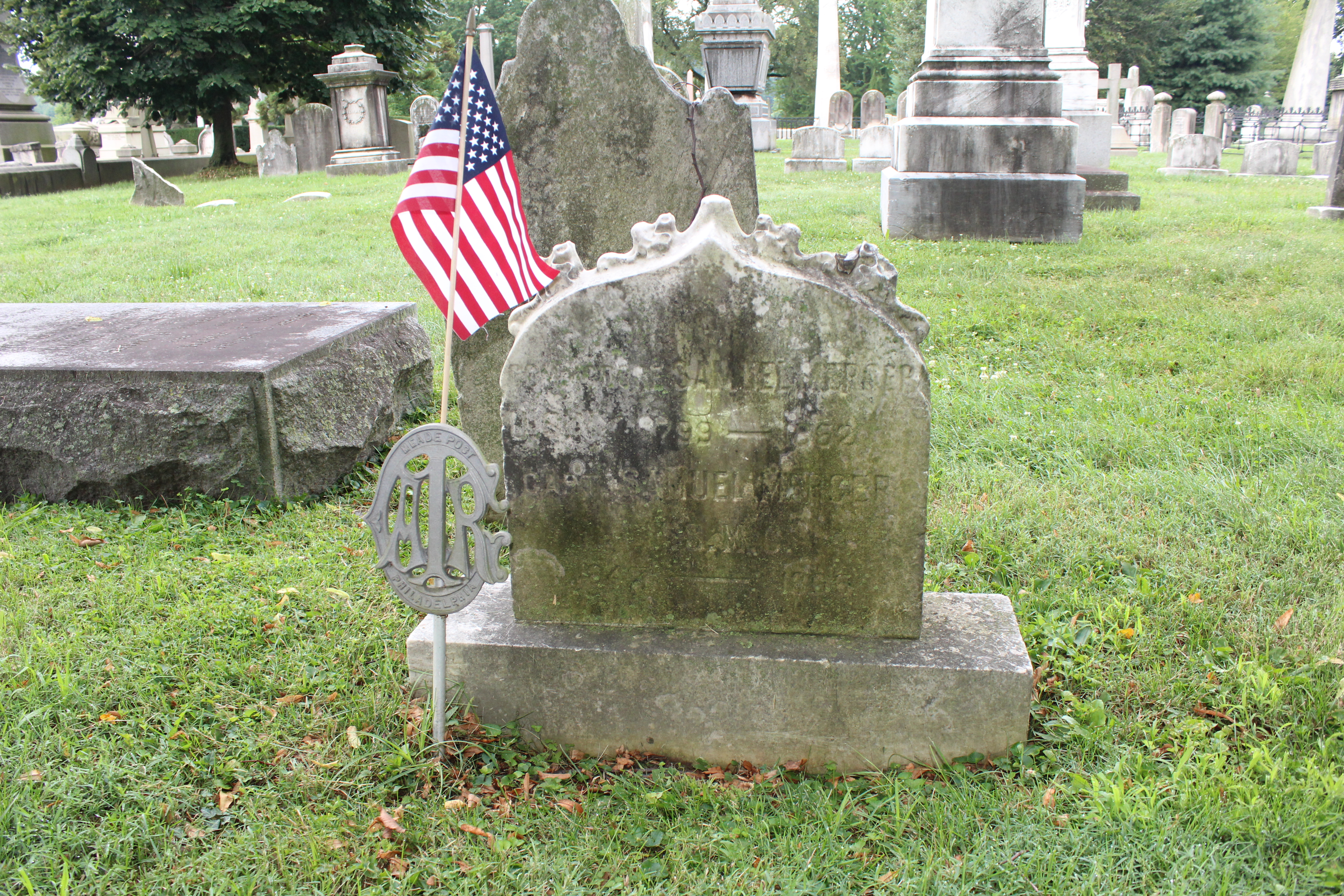
Samuel Mercer gravestone in Laurel Hill Cemetery

Mercer was relieved from active command due to age, and served on the Navy Retiring Board until his death in Philadelphia on March 6, 1862. He was interred at Laurel Hill Cemetery in Philadelphia.
