= Henry Craven =

Henry Craven may refer to:

- Henry Thornton Craven (1818–1905), English actor and dramatist
- Henry Smith Craven (1845–1889), American inventor, civil and military engineer
