= USS Wabash (1855) =

Gunboat of the United States Navy

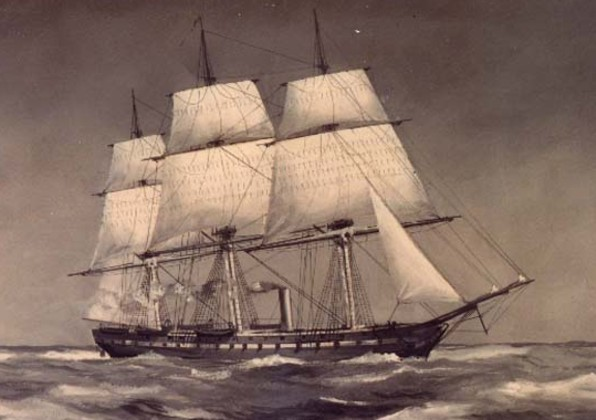
- Wash drawing in grey tones by Clary Ray, circa 1900, showing USS Wabash under steam and sail

History

United States
- Name: USS Wabash
- Namesake: A river that rises in Drake County, Ohio, near Fort Recovery.
- Builder: Philadelphia Navy Yard
- Laid down: May 16, 1854
- Launched: October 24, 1855
- Sponsored by: Miss Pennsylvania Grice
- Commissioned: August 18, 1856 at Philadelphia, Pennsylvania
- Recommissioned: October 24, 1871 at Boston, Massachusetts
- Decommissioned: April 25, 1874 at the Boston Navy Yard
- Stricken: November 15, 1912
- Fate: Sold, November 15, 1912 at Boston.

General characteristics
- Class & type: Merrimack
- Type: Screw frigate
- Displacement: 4,808 tons
- Length: 301 ft 6 in (91.90 m)
- Beam: 51 ft 4 in (15.65 m)
- Draft: 23 ft (7.0 m)
- Propulsion: steam engine, and schooner sail
- Speed: 9 knots (17 km/h; 10 mph)
- Complement: 642
- Armament: 2 × 10 in (250 mm) Dahlgren smoothbore guns; 14 × 8 in (200 mm) 63 hundredweight shell guns; 24 × 9 in (230 mm) Dahlgren smoothbore guns; 2 × 12 pdr smoothbore guns; Jul 1862 8 in (200 mm) Dahlgren guns replaced by 9 in (230 mm) Dahlgren guns

General characteristics 1863
- Class & type: none
- Armament: 1 × 150 pdr rifle; 2 × 100 pdr rifle; 1 × 10 in (250 mm) Dahlgren smoothbore guns; 42 × 9 in (230 mm) Dahlgren guns; 1 × 30 pdr rifle; 1 × 12 pdr howitzer

General characteristics 1865
- Class & type: none
- Armament: 1 × 150 pdr rifle; 1 × 10 in (250 mm) Dahlgren smoothbore guns; 42 × 9 in (230 mm) Dahlgren guns; 4 × 32 pdr smoothbore guns; 1 × 30 pdr rifle

USS Wabash was a steam screw frigate of the United States Navy that served during the American Civil War. She was based on the same plans as Colorado. Post-war she continued to serve her country in European operations and eventually served as a barracks ship in Boston, Massachusetts, and was sold in 1912.

== Pre-Civil War service ==
Wabash—the first U.S. Navy ship to bear that name—was laid down on May 16, 1854, by the Philadelphia Navy Yard; launched on October 24, 1855, sponsored by Miss Pennsylvania Grice; and commissioned there on August 18, 1856, Captain Frederick K. Engle in command.

Wabash departed Philadelphia, Pennsylvania on September 7, 1856, stopping at Portsmouth, New Hampshire, to embark President Franklin Pierce for passage to Annapolis, Maryland. She arrived at New York on October 23, 1856, sailing on November 28, 1856, to become flagship of Commodore Hiram Paulding's Home Squadron. The squadron was instrumental in foiling the expedition against Nicaragua underway by American filibuster, William Walker, who had dreamed of uniting the nations of Central America into a vast military empire led by himself. Through insurrection, he became president of Nicaragua in 1855 only to have Cornelius Vanderbilt—who controlled the country's shipping lifelines—shut off supplies and aid. A revolt toppled Walker from power, and he was trying for a military comeback before he was captured in 1857 by the Home Squadron. Stateside controversy over the questionable legality of seizing American nationals in foreign, neutral lands prompted President James Buchanan to relieve Commodore Paulding of his command. Wabash was decommissioned on March 1, 1858, at the New York Navy Yard.

=== First recommissioning, 1858–1859 ===
Wabash was recommissioned on May 25, 1858, Captain Samuel Barron in command, and became the flagship of Commodore Elie A. F. La Vallette's Mediterranean Squadron. The future naval hero of the Battle of Manila Bay during the Spanish–American War, George Dewey—then a midshipman—served aboard the Wabash when she touched at her first port of call, Gibraltar, on August 17, 1858. Dewey would later write in his autobiography that "The Wabash was quite the finest ship of the foreign fleet and also the largest." In April 1859, Wabash ran aground at Livorno, Grand Duchy of Tuscany. She was refloated with the assistance of a British steamship having had her cannon taken off. Wabash returned to the New York Navy Yard on December 16, 1859, and decommissioned there on December 20, 1859.

== Civil War service, 1861–1865 ==
=== Early war ===
With the outbreak of the American Civil War, Wabash was recommissioned on May 16, 1861, Captain Samuel Mercer in command and Thomas G. Corbin (descended from a prominent Virginia family but also a career naval office loyal to the Union) as his executive officer. Wabash departed New York on May 30, 1861, as flagship of the Atlantic Blockading Squadron under Rear Admiral Silas H. Stringham.

Wabash captured the brigantine Sarah Starr off Charleston, South Carolina, on August 3, 1861, and recaptured the American schooner Mary Alice, taken earlier by CSS Dixie. By this date, she had also captured the brigantines Hannah, Balch, and Solferino, along with 22 Confederate prisoners from the four vessels.

On August 26, 1861, Wabash departed Hampton Roads, bound for Hatteras Inlet, North Carolina, to take part in the first combined amphibious assault of the war. Wabash accompanied Monticello, Pawnee, revenue cutter Harriet Lane, the tug Fanny, and two transports, carrying over 900 troops under Major General Benjamin Butler. Union forces secured Hatteras Inlet with the capture of Forts Hatteras and Clark on August 29, 1861. The attacking force suffered no casualties and took over 700 prisoners. Among these was Captain Samuel Barron of the Confederate Navy, who before his resignation from the United States Navy served on the Wabash under Rear Admiral La Vallette.

=== South Atlantic Blockading Squadron ===
Wabash was later designated the flagship of Flag Officer Samuel Francis du Pont, the new commander of the South Atlantic Blockading Squadron, and was sent to the New York Navy Yard for repairs on September 21, 1861.

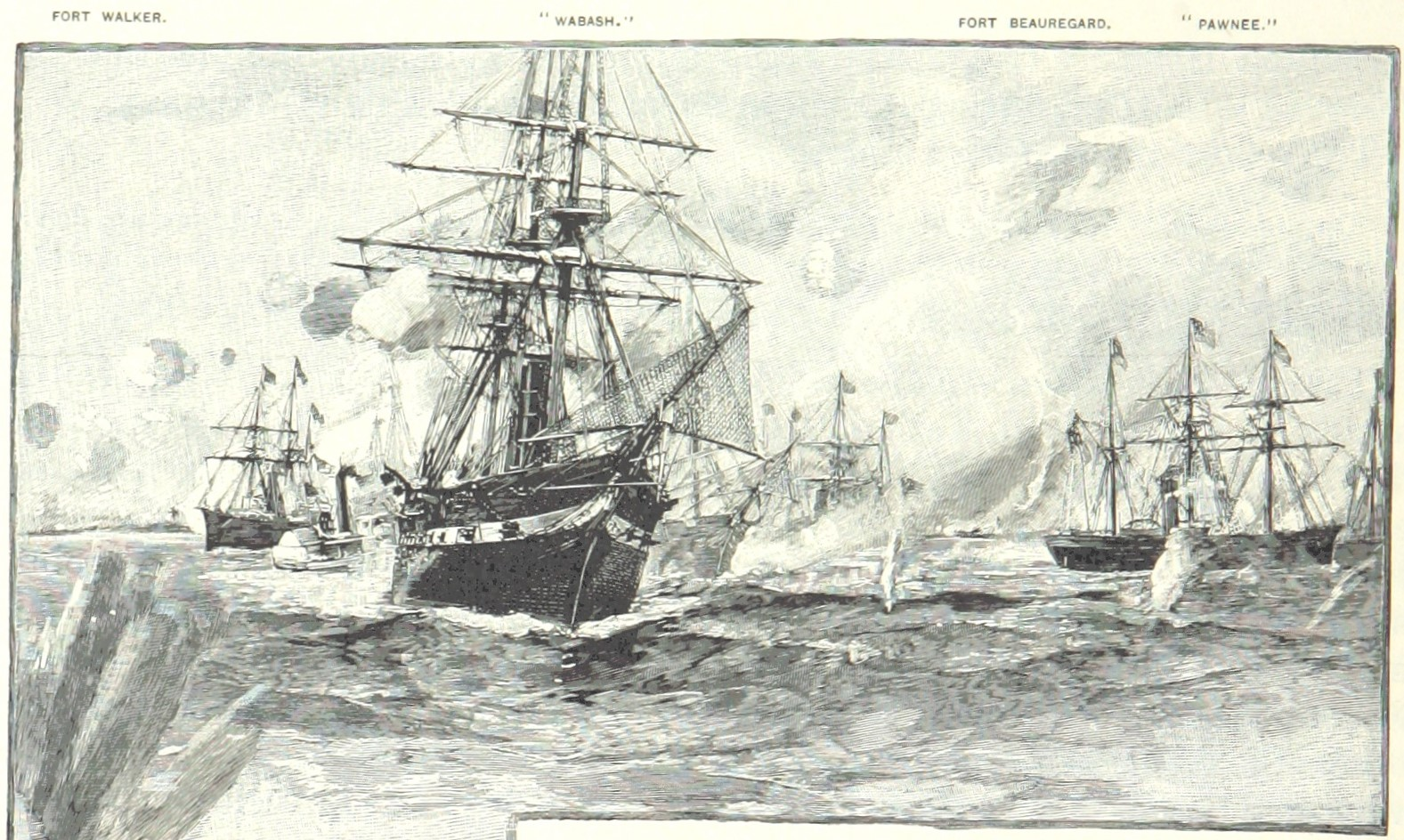
Wabash (foreground) with the Union fleet at Port Royal

After refit, Wabash departed Fort Monroe on 29 October 1861 to spearhead the Federal assault on Port Royal, South Carolina. The assembled invasion fleet was the largest yet organized by the Navy, containing 77 vessels and 16,000 Army troops under Brigadier General Thomas W. Sherman. The fleet ran into a hurricane on 1 November with devastating results.

The combined force secured Port Royal Sound on 7 November 1861 after a furious four-hour battle. Wabash led the battle line in this major strategic Union victory. Executive Officer Corbin remained with the Wabash following Captain Mercer's retirement, and was promoted to Commander in July 1862, only leaving when assigned as Commandant of Midshipmen at the U.S. Naval Academy in 1863 (and in 1864 assuming command of the steamer USS Augusta and becoming commander of the West India Squadron enforcing the blockade).

Meanwhile, Wabash now took up permanent station on the Charleston blockade, operating out of Port Royal. On March 11, 1862, a landing party led by ship's commanding officer, Commander C. R. P. Rodgers, occupied St. Augustine, Florida. A detachment of seamen and officers from Wabash landed and manned a battery which bombarded Fort Pulaski, Georgia, on April 10 and April 11, 1862, and was instrumental in forcing that Southern fort to surrender. A naval battery of three 12 pounder howitzers from Wabash supported Union troops at the Battle of Pocotaligo, on October 22, 1862.

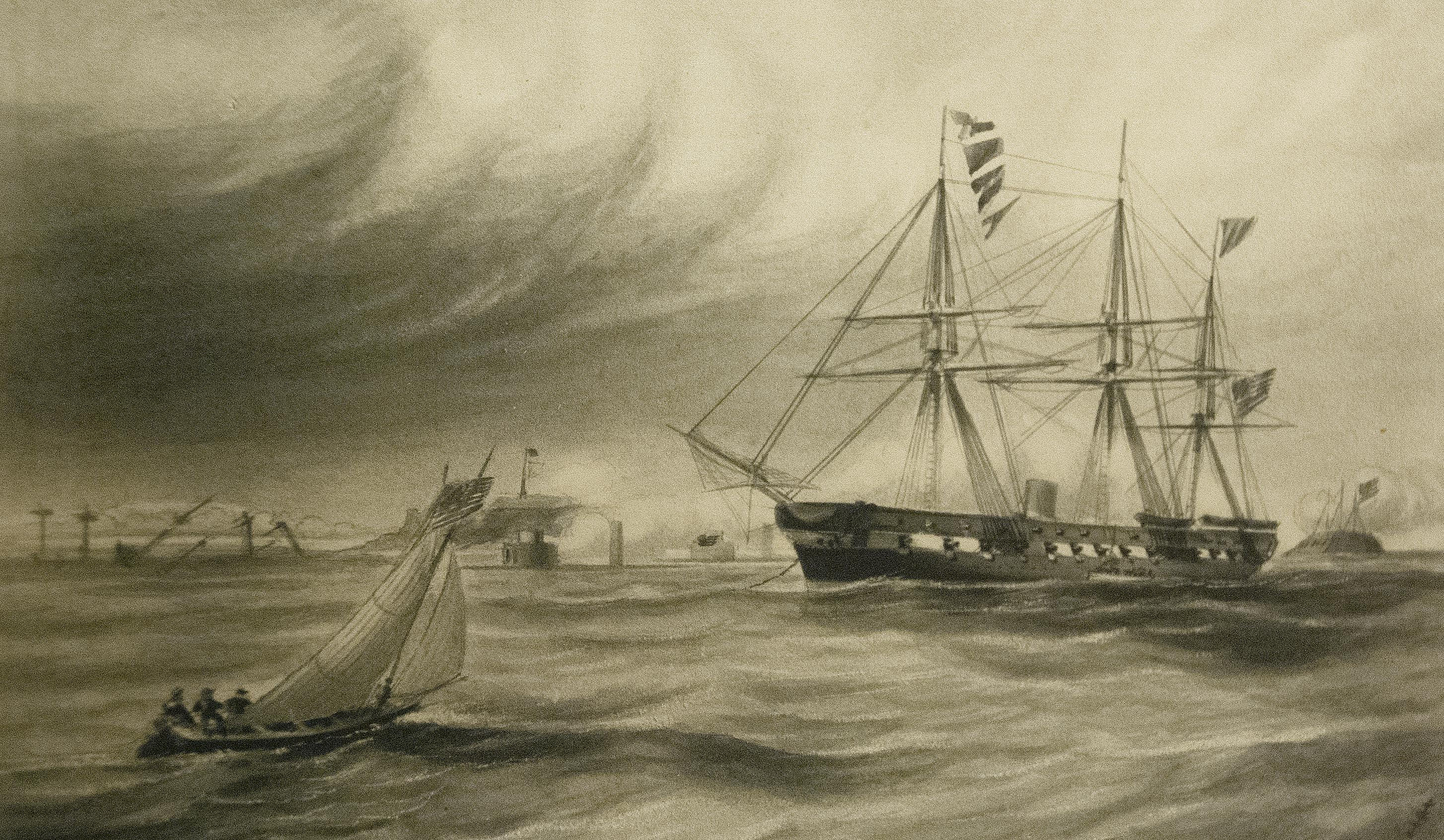
Wabash at Fort Sumter

Confederate vessels twice harassed Wabash while on duty in Port Royal Sound. On August 5, 1863, CSS Juno, a small steamer on picket duty below Fort Sumter, fired upon and ran down a launch from Wabash, capturing 10 sailors and drowning two. The CSS David submarine torpedo boat also attacked Wabash on April 18, 1864. Ensign Charles H. Craven, officer of the deck, spotted the cigar-shaped vessel in time for Wabash to get underway. The David disengaged from the attack in the face of musket fire and round shot discharged from Wabash.

=== North Atlantic Blockading Squadron ===
Wabash departed her station on 1 October, bound for the Norfolk Navy Yard and an overhaul. En route, she grounded briefly on Frying Pan Shoals, suffering minor damage to her rudder. Repairs and overhaul were completed by 16 December, in time for Wabash to join the North Atlantic Blockading Squadron and to participate in the first attack on Fort Fisher, North Carolina, on December 24 and December 25, 1864. The failure of this initial attempt to take the fort necessitated a second, successful combined operation between January 13 and January 15, 1865. It was during this second attack on Fort Fisher, that corporal Andrew J. Tomlin and ordinary seamen Louis C. Shepard earned the Medal of Honor.

Wabash returned to Hampton Roads on January 17, 1865, receiving orders on January 25, 1865, to proceed to the Boston Navy Yard. Wabash was decommissioned at Boston on February 14, 1865.

== Post–Civil War service, 1866–1912 ==
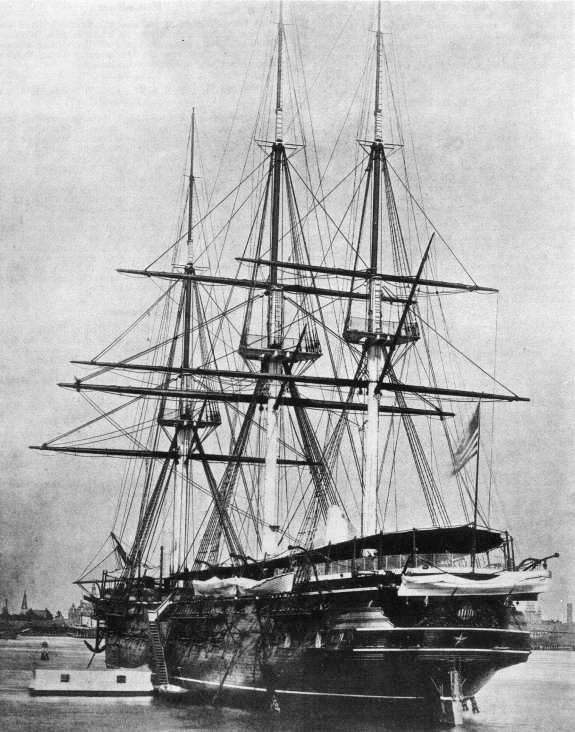
USS Wabash as a receiving ship; she is still fully rigged although her sails have been removed

Wabash was placed in ordinary from 1866 to 1869; overhauled during 1870 to 1871; and recommissioned on October 24, 1871, Captain Robert W. Shufeldt commanding. Wabash departed the Boston Navy Yard on November 17, 1871, and served as the flagship of Rear Admiral James Alden, commanding the Mediterranean Squadron. She arrived at Cadiz, Spain, on December 14, 1871, and cruised throughout the Mediterranean until November 30, 1873, when she departed Gibraltar, bound for Key West, Florida. Wabash arrived in Key West on January 3, 1874. She was decommissioned on April 25, 1874, at the Boston Navy Yard. In 1875, she was placed in ordinary and served as a housed-over receiving ship from 1876 to 1912. Wabash was struck from the Navy list on November 15, 1912, and sold that same day to the Boston Iron and Metal Company, Boston, Massachusetts. The following year, she was burned to facilitate salvage of her metal parts.

== Surviving guns ==
Five IX-inch Dahlgren smooth-bore cannon which served on the Wabash survived at the Boston Navy Yard. They were transferred in 2010 to the National Civil War Naval Museum in Columbus, Georgia, where they are on display. Four of the guns are Tredegar Iron Works pieces. One is registry #45, one is either #50 or 51, one is probably #34, and the number of the fourth is unknown. All were cast in 1855. The fifth Dahlgren gun was cast by Cyrus Alger & Co., Boston, Massachusetts, in 1864, registry # 852.

Additionally, a 6.4-inch (100-pounder) Parrott rifle which served on the Wabash survives in Danvers, Massachusetts. It is a West Point Foundry foundry piece, registry #116, cast in 1863.

== See also ==
- List of steam frigates of the United States Navy
- Union Navy
- Battle of Fort Pulaski
