= Thomas Tingey Craven (admiral, born 1873) =

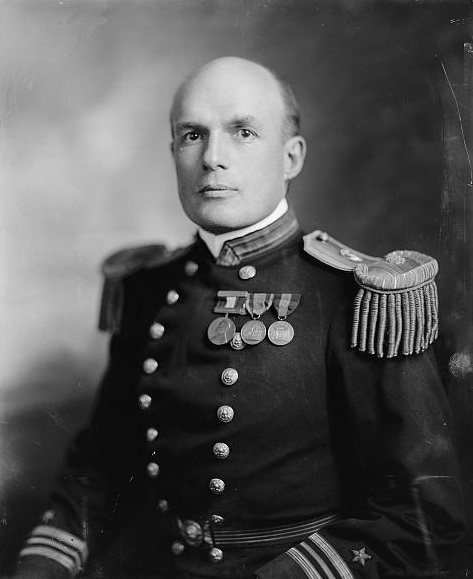
- Lieutenant Commander Thomas Tingey Craven in service dress blue uniform.
- Born: July 8, 1873; Vallejo, California, U.S.
- Died: April 5, 1950 (aged 76); St. Albans, New York, U.S.
- Military career
- Allegiance: United States of America
- Branch: United States Navy
- Service years: 1896–1937,1942–1946
- Rank: Vice Admiral
- Commands: Director of Naval Communications
- Conflicts: Philippine–American War; World War I World War II
- Awards: Navy Distinguished Service Medal

Thomas Tingey Craven (8 July 1873 in Vallejo, California – 5 April 1950 in St. Albans, New York) was a United States naval officer with service in World War I and World War II and rose to the rank of vice admiral.

== Biography ==
He was a son of Henry Smith Craven, a United States Navy officer and engineer and the grandson of his namesake, Thomas Tingey Craven (1808–1887) and great-grandson of Commodore Thomas Tingey (1750–1829).

Craven graduated from the United States Naval Academy in 1896. His first assignment after graduation was to the newly commissioned battleship USS Massachusetts (BB-2), where he served as a naval cadet. (Prior to the first world war, graduates of the naval academy were required to serve two years at sea prior to being commissioned.) Craven was commissioned as an ensign on 6 May 1898. During the Spanish–American War he served on the collier USS Scindia which delivered coal to recently captured Guantanamo Bay in Cuba in June 1898. He married Antoinette Merritt in 1901.

In 1908, Craven was stationed aboard the battleship USS South Carolina (BB-26) assigned duties as the ship's gunnery officer. From 1915 to 1916, he was a student and instructor at the Naval War College. In 1916, Thomas T. Craven was given command of the gunboat Sacramento (PG-19) which he commanded throughout World War I until 1918.

In 1919 while serving as the director of Naval Aviation, Tingey ordered the USS Jupiter (AC-3), a collier, to be converted into the U.S. Navy's first dedicated aircraft carrier which was renamed, USS Langley (CV-1). In the aftermath of the Honda Point Disaster in September 1923, Admiral Tingey defended Captain Edward H. Watson, Commanding Officer of Destroyer Squadron 11, during the courts martial proceedings.

During the remainder of his naval career, Craven commanded Destroyer Squadron 15, was the Director of Naval Communications, commanded Great Lakes Naval Training Station, the Yangtze Patrol in China, Battleship Division One and served as the Commandant of the Thirteenth Naval District in Bremerton, Washington. He was promoted to rear admiral on 15 February 1928 and retired from active duty on 1 August 1937, having reached the age of sixty-four.

Following the United States' entrance into World War II, Craven was recalled to active duty and promoted to vice admiral on 16 June 1942, serving as superintendent of the New York Maritime Academy at Fort Schuyler, NY until 1946, when he was succeeded by Vice Admiral Herbert F. Leary.

After retirement, Tingey lived in Weston, Massachusetts. He died at the St. Albans Naval Hospital in Queens, New York City and was buried at the Green-Wood Cemetery in Brooklyn.
