= Andrew J. Tomlin =

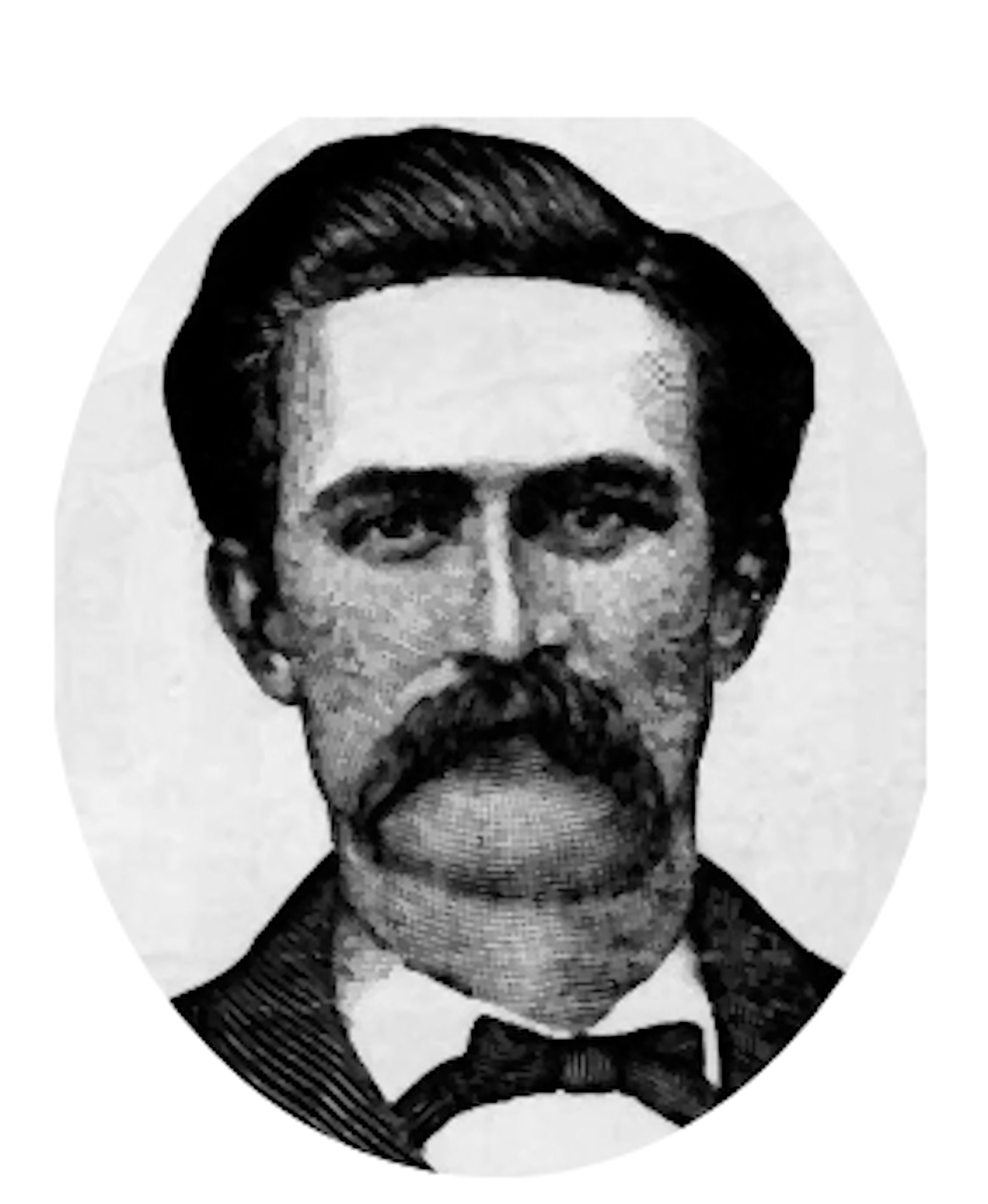
- Born: March 15, 1845; Goshen, New Jersey, US
- Died: November 1, 1906 (aged 61); Goshen, New Jersey, US
- Burial place: Goshen Methodist Cemetery, Goshen, New Jersey
- Military career
- Allegiance: United States
- Branch: United States Marine Corps
- Rank: Corporal
- Unit: USS Wabash
- Conflicts: American Civil War: Second Battle of Fort Fisher
- Awards: Medal of Honor

Sheriff of Cape May County
- In office 1895–1898
- Preceded by: Robert E. Hand
- Succeeded by: John W. Reeves

Andrew Jackson Tomlin (March 15, 1845 – November 1, 1906) was a United States Marine and a recipient of the American military's highest award – the Medal of Honor – for his actions during the Second Battle of Fort Fisher during the Civil War.

Tomlin enlisted in the Marine Corps from Philadelphia in July 1863.

== Medal of Honor citation ==

Rank and Organization:

Corporal, U.S. Marine Corps. Born: 1844, Goshen, N.J. Accredited To: New Jersey. G.O. No.: 59, June 22, 1865.

Report of Lieutenant Louis E. Fagan, Lieut. U.S. Marines, Comd’g Guard, Frigate Wabash:

“… All my men behaved well, but I would present especially to your attention the conduct of Corporal Tomlin, of the guard, who under a heavy fire of the enemy’s sharp-shooters, advanced into an open plain close to the fort and assisted a wounded comrade to a place of safety. I respectfully ask that his conduct may be made known to the honorable Secretary of the Navy, so that he may receive the Medal of Honor. …”

Citation:

As corporal of the guard on board the USS Wabash during the assault on Fort Fisher, on January 15, 1865. As one of 200 Marines assembled to hold a line intrenchements it the rear of the fort which the enemy threatened to attack in force following a retreat in panic by more than two-thirds of the assaulting ground forces, Corporal Tomlin took position in line and remained until morning when relief troops arrived from the fort. When one of his comrades was struck down by enemy fire, he unhesitatingly advanced under a withering fire of musketry into an open plain close to the fort and assisted the wounded man to place of safety.

== Post war ==
After the war, Tomlin returned to his home in New Jersey becoming commissioner of juries in 1880 and Sheriff of Cape May County, New Jersey, in 1895.

Tomlin died on November 1, 1906, and is buried in Goshen Methodist Cemetery, in the Goshen section of Middle Township, New Jersey

== See also ==
- List of American Civil War Medal of Honor recipients: T–Z
