= USS Lawrence (1843) =

Brig of the United States Navy

History

United States
- Launched: 1 August 1843
- Commissioned: 19 September 1843
- Decommissioned: 12 September 1846

General characteristics
- Displacement: 364 tons
- Length: 109 ft 9 in (33.45 m)
- Draft: 13 ft 3 in (4.04 m)
- Complement: 80
- Armament: 2 32-pounders, 8 short 32-pounder carronades

The second USS Lawrence was a brig in the United States Navy launched by Langley B. Culley at Baltimore, Maryland on 1 August 1843 and commissioned 19 September 1843, Commander William H. Gardner in command.

After sailing to the Norfolk Navy Yard on 11 October 1843, Lawrence fitted out for a cruise to the West Indies. Underway 16 November, the ship cruised along the northern coast of South America until returning to Pensacola, Florida, 25 January 1844. She began a second cruise on 5 February, visiting Havana, Cuba, before proceeding north to Hampton Roads 8 March for repairs at the Norfolk Navy Yard.

As tensions escalated in the Gulf of Mexico, The USS Lawrence, Captain Samuel Mercer commanding, sailed south to join the Home Squadron on 14 June. She spent the next year cruising along the Gulf Coast, providing security to American shipping in the region and helping suppress piracy. After war broke out following a clash of arms in Texas on 25 April 1846, Lawrence cruised on a blockade station off the Mexican coast, remaining there until 17 June. In the interim, the brig landed sailors to help protect Point Isabel on 31 April. Lawrence's usefulness was limited by a deep draught that limited her to deeper water, as well as limited cargo space, and the brig was ordered to New York City, arriving there via Pensacola on 3 September.

The brig decommissioned at New York on 12 September 1846 and was sold at Boston, Massachusetts later in the year.
