= Natali Vineyards =

Winery in Cape May County, New Jersey

Coordinates: 39.127139°N 74.858285°W

- Location: 221 North Delsea Drive (Route 47), Cape May Court House, NJ, USA
- Coordinates: 39.127139 N, 74.858285 W
- Appellation: Cape May Peninsula
- First vines planted: 2001; 24 years ago
- Opened to the public: 2007; 18 years ago
- Key people: Tim Jobe - Winemaker Richard Caplan - Owner
- Acres cultivated: 7
- Cases/yr: 1,800 (2013)
- Other attractions: Picnicking permitted, pet-friendly
- Distribution: On-site, wholesale, on-line
- Tasting: Daily tastings most days, tours by appointment
- Website: http://www.natalivineyards.com/

Natali Vineyards is a winery in the Goshen section of Middle Township (mailing address is Cape May Court House) in Cape May County, New Jersey, USA. Formerly a pasture for horses, the vineyard was first planted in 2001, and opened to the public in 2007. Natali has seven acres of grapes under cultivation, and produces 1,800 cases of wine per year. The winery is named after the vintner and co-owner of the winery.

== Wines ==
Natali Vineyards is located in the Outer Coastal Plain AVA and produces wine from Cabernet Franc, Cabernet Sauvignon, Chardonnay, Dolcetto, Merlot, Muscat blanc, Nebbiolo, Pinot gris, Sauvignon blanc, Syrah, Tempranillo, Trebbiano, Viognier and Zinfandel grapes. Natali also makes fruit wines, beach plums, blueberries, cherries, cranberries. It is the only winery in the world that produces wine from beach plums (Prunus maritima), a fruit that grows in coastal areas, and is often used to make jams.

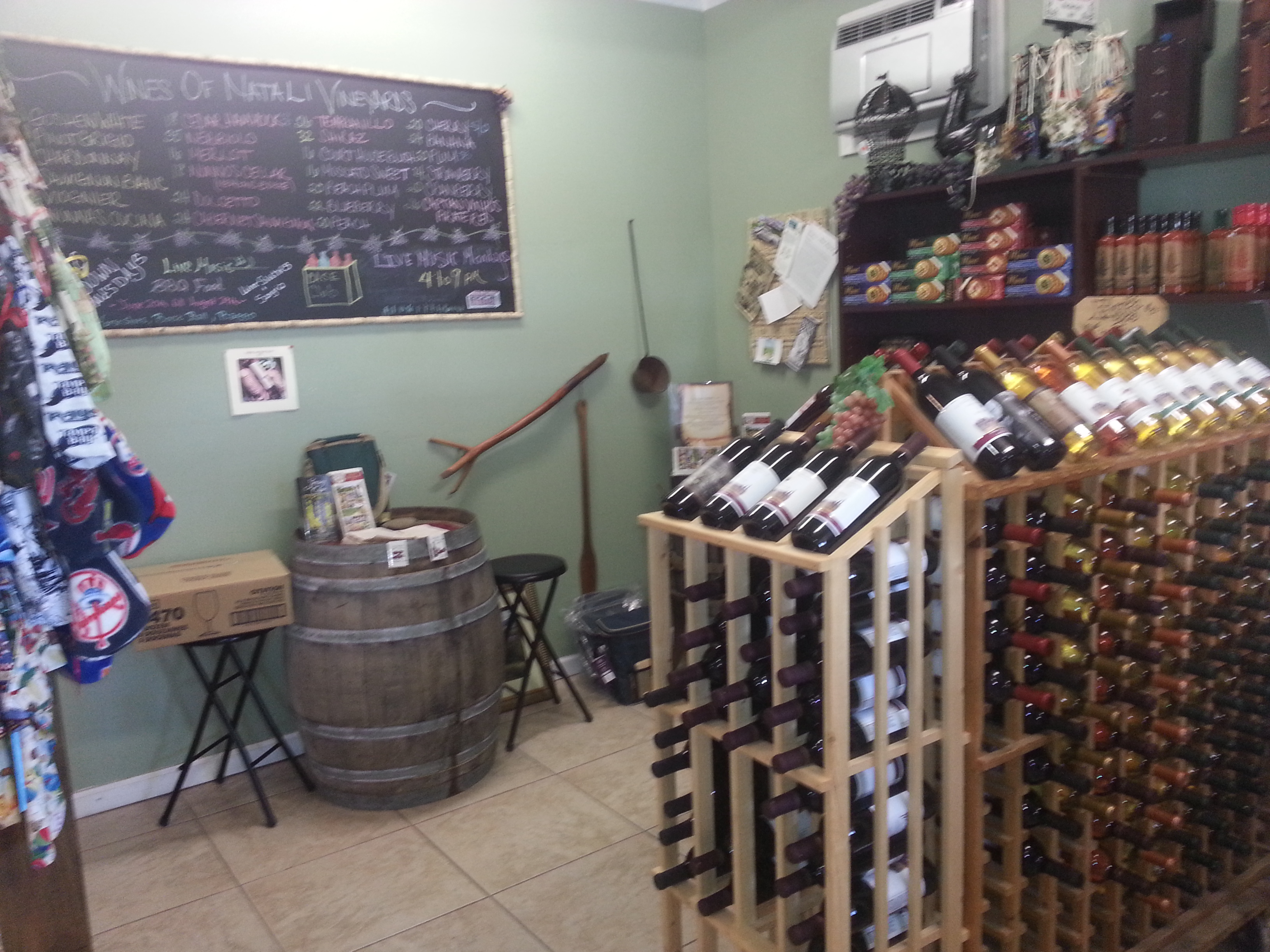
Natali Vineyards tasting room

== Licensing and associations ==
Natali has a plenary winery license from the New Jersey Division of Alcoholic Beverage Control, which allows it to produce an unrestricted amount of wine, operate up to 15 off-premises sales rooms, and ship up to 12 cases per year to consumers in-state or out-of-state. The winery is a member of the Garden State Wine Growers Association and the Outer Coastal Plain Vineyard Association.

== See also ==
- Alcohol laws of New Jersey
- American wine
- Judgment of Princeton
- List of wineries, breweries, and distilleries in New Jersey
- New Jersey Farm Winery Act
- New Jersey Wine Industry Advisory Council
- New Jersey wine
