= Thomas Tingey Craven (admiral, born 1808) =

United States Navy commodore (1808–1887)

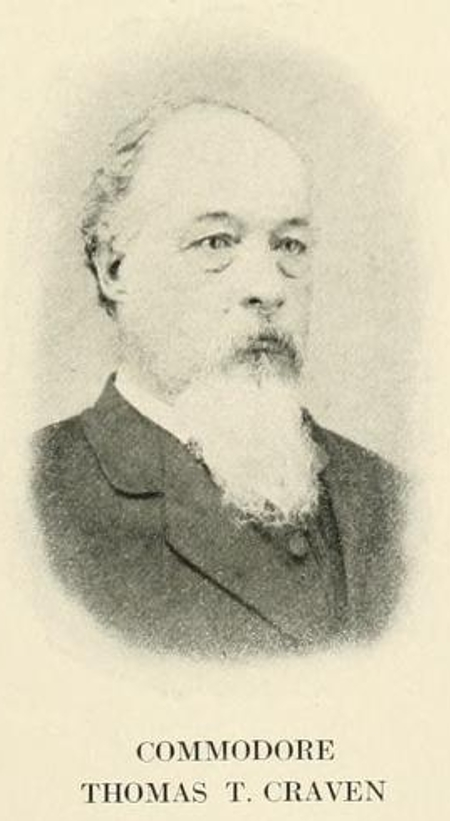

Thomas Tingey Craven (December 30, 1808 – August 23, 1887) was a 19th-century United States Navy officer who rose to prominence during the Civil War.

== Origins and education ==
He was the oldest son of Tunis Craven, a navy purser, and Hannah (Tingey) Craven, the daughter of Commodore Thomas Tingey, a longtime commandant of the Washington Navy Yard. He was born in the commandant's residence at the Washington Navy Yard on December 30, 1808. His brother Tunis Craven also joined the navy, and perished with USS Tecumseh at the Battle of Mobile Bay. Another brother, Alfred Wingate, was a noted civil engineer who constructed railroads. Their father was reassigned to Portsmouth, New Hampshire from 1813 to 1823 and Thomas and Alfred attended the nearby Phillips Exeter Academy. Thomas, like his brothers, was a graduate of the American Literary, Scientific, and Military Academy, the forerunner of Norwich University, entering in 1822 and graduating in December 1823.

== Naval career ==
Already a midshipman as of May 1, 1822, from 1823 until 1828, he served in the Pacific Squadron on USS United States and on USS Peacock. Becoming a Passed Midshipman on May 24, 1828, in 1828 he joined USS Erie, of the West India Squadron, as sailing master, and took part in the capture of the pirate Federal. After being commissioned lieutenant on May 27, 1830, he spent three years in cruising on USS Boxer, and in 1835/36 was attached to the receiving ship at New York, after which he joined USS John Adams. From 1838 to 1842 he commanded USS Vincennes, Captain Charles Wilkes' flagship in the United States Exploring Expedition. He then served on USS Boxer, USS Fulton, USS Monroe, USS Macedonia, and USS Porpoise, principally in the African Squadron, after which, during 1846, he was attached to the naval rendezvous in New York. He then served on USS Ohio, in the Pacific Squadron, and on USS Independence in the Mediterranean Squadron, returning home in January 1850.

In the following July he was made commandant of midshipmen in the United States Naval Academy in Annapolis, becoming commander on December 16, 1852, and remaining at the academy until June 1855. After commanding USS Congress of the Mediterranean Squadron for several years, he was ordered to resume his post at Annapolis. In October 1860, he was detached from this place, and, after a short time spent in recruiting service in Portland, Maine, was commissioned captain on June 7, 1861, and assigned to the command of the Potomac Flotilla.

In the autumn of 1861 he was placed in command of USS Brooklyn, participating in the capture of New Orleans and subsequent operations on the Mississippi River. He was made commodore on July 16, 1862, and during the subsequent years of the American Civil War commanded USS Niagara off the coasts of England and France.

In September 1866, he was placed in command of the navy yard at Mare Island, California, where he received, on October 10 of the same year, his commission as rear admiral, and continued there until August 1868, when he assumed command of the North Pacific Squadron. In June 1869, Tingey was relieved by Rear Adm. Thomas Turner and returned to his command of the Mare Island Navy Yard. On December 30, 1869, he was retired, but continued on duty in San Francisco until that office was dispensed with.

== Family ==
He married Virginia Wingate, and later Emily Henderson. He had eight children, and four of his sons attended the naval academy or were connected with the U.S. Navy: Charles Henderson (1843–1898), Henry Smith (1845–1889), Alfred (1846–1926) and Macdonough (1858–1919). His grandson (Henry's son) Thomas Tingey Craven served in the U.S. Navy in the early 20th century and played a prominent role in the development of naval aviation. His daughter Ida married Frank W. Hackett, who would go on to become Assistant Secretary of the Navy. He died at the Boston Navy Yard on August 23, 1887 and is buried at Arlington National Cemetery.
