= Samuel Barron (1809–1888) =

American Civil War Era navy officer (1809–1888)

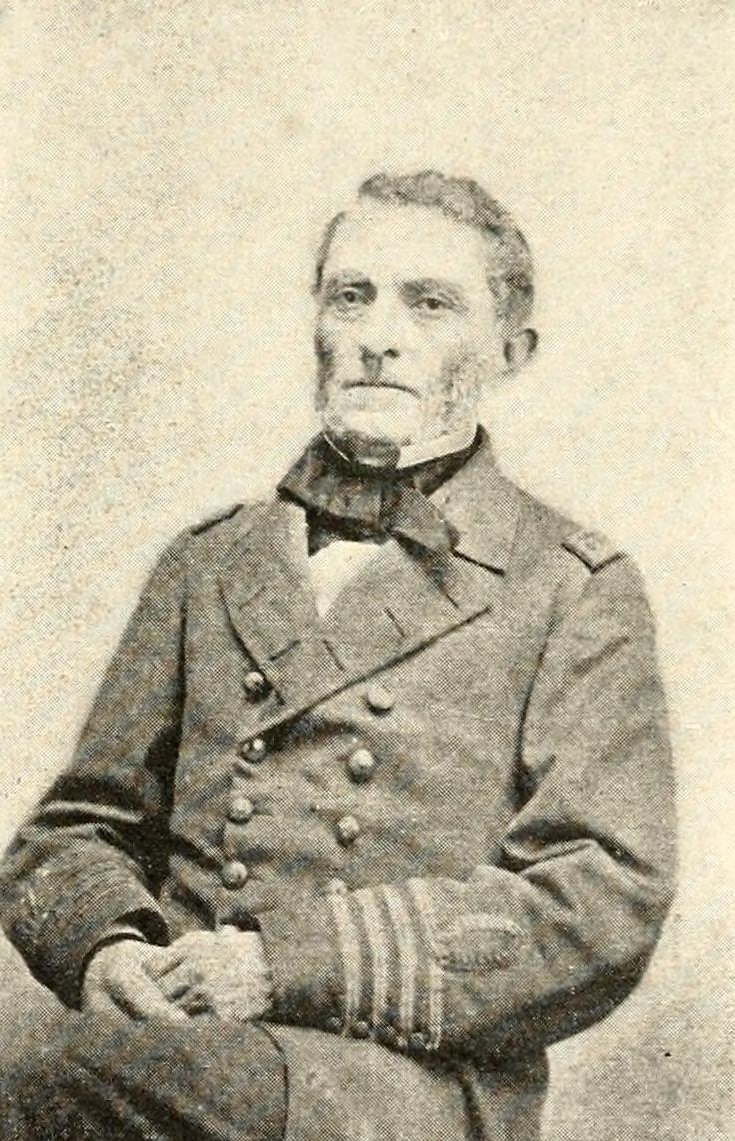
- Samuel Barron
- Born: November 28, 1809; Hampton, Virginia
- Died: February 26, 1888 (aged 78); Essex County, Virginia
- Military career
- Allegiance: United States; Virginia; Confederate States
- Branch: United States Navy; Virginia Naval Militia; Confederate States Navy
- Service years: 1820–1861 (USN); 1861–1865 (CSN)
- Rank: Captain (USN); Captain (CSN)
- Unit: USS Wabash
- Conflicts: Mexican-American War; American Civil War: Battle of Hatteras Inlet Batteries (surrendered)

Samuel Barron (November 28, 1809 – February 26, 1888) was a Virginia-born naval officer who served in the U.S. Navy and later in the Confederate States Navy. After surrendering after the Battle of Hatteras Inlet, then being released in a prisoner exchange, Commodore Barron also represented the Confederacy in Europe during the American Civil War before returning to Virginia and receiving a presidential pardon.

== Early life and career ==
Born to the former Elizabeth McLachlin (1770-1818) and her husband Commodore Samuel Barron (1765-1810), who commanded the nearby Gosport Shipyard while attempting to recover from yellow fever incurred during the First Barbary War. The Barrons were a prominent military and shipbuilding family in Hampton, Virginia, and his uncle James Barron also served in the U.S. Navy. The boy Barron was entered into the U.S. Navy on January 1, 1812, although only two years old and his father having died when he was an infant. His name might honor his great-grandfather, also Samuel Barron, who had commanded the seemingly strong Fort George (built 1728) at Old Point Comfort until a hurricane destroyed the structure in 1749. That Captain Samuel Barron saved the entire garrison and their families, before establishing a residence for his family across Mill Creek, which ultimately became Hampton. His sons (this boy's grandfather) James Barron the Elder and Richard Barron owned considerable property in Hampton and established a shipyard which built ships for the Virginia Navy.

== U.S. Naval Career ==
In 1820, Barron began his own naval career as a midshipman. He rose through the ranks and was commissioned a lieutenant on March 3, 1827. He was promoted to commander on July 15, 1847, during the Mexican–American War.

Commanding the USS John Adams from 1849 to 1853, Barron was made a captain in September 1855. He then was captain of the steam frigate USS Wabash, whose crew included George Dewey, from 1858 until 1859. He was appointed chief of the Bureau of Detail in 1860, and thus held considerable influence within the US Navy. Following Lincoln's inauguration the following year, he was suspected of attempting to gain control over the Department of the Navy.

== Confederate Naval Career ==
In April 1861, after Virginia announced its secession from the Union, Barron resigned from the U.S. Navy and, although his resignation was denied by the United States (later being listed by Navy Secretary Gideon Welles on April 22 as dismissed), he accepted a commission as Captain in the Virginia Navy and, as chief of the Office of Naval Detail and Equipment, later assisting in organizing a coastal defense of Virginia and North Carolina.

After Virginia's fleet was integrated with the Confederate Navy, Barron was issued a commission as commander and appointed chief of the Office of Orders and Details on June 10. Barron would remain in that post until July 20, when Confederate Secretary of the Navy Stephen R. Mallory agreed to Barron's request to be assigned as commander of coastal defenses of Virginia and North Carolina, an important port for Pamlico Sound-based Confederate privateers. Arriving at his headquarters on Fort Hatteras on August 28, Barron commanded the defense of both the forts Hatteras and Clark against Union Flag Officer Silas H. Stringham during the Battle of Hatteras Inlet on August 28–29. Barron ultimately surrendered, and was taken as a prisoner of war to Fort Columbus on Governors Island in New York harbor, then to Ft. Warren in Boston harbor.

In 1862 while imprisoned at Ft. Warren, Boston, Lt. William T. Glassell stated: "Generals Buckner and Tilghman were then rooming with me, and together with Commodore Barron...."

After his release in a prisoner exchange, Barron briefly commanded naval forces in Virginia in November 1862 before he was sent to Great Britain to take command of the two ironclad rams, CSS North Carolina and CSS Mississippi (also known as the 'Laird Rams'), that were being built under the direction of Commander James D. Bulloch for the Confederacy. After British authorities seized the ships the following year, Barron traveled to Paris where he served as "Flag Officer" commanding Confederate States Naval Forces in Europe. Thus, he was the contact for Confederate naval officers as well as blockade runners and privateers until February 25, 1865, when he resigned his commission and returned to the United States shortly before the Confederacy's surrender a month later. He applied for amnesty, which President Andrew Johnson granted on October 10, 1867.

== Personal life ==
Barron married North Carolina born Imogen L. Wright (1808-1855) in Portsmouth, Virginia on January 1, 1833. Before her death after the birth of their third son William Thompson Barron (1855-1924), their family included sons Samuel (1836-1892) and James (1849-1914), as well as daughters Imogen (1835-1909), Elizabeth (1841-1855) and Virginia (1845-1888). The youngest daughter, Jennie, became the only sister to marry, which she did in 1865 to Edward Rowzee Baird of Occupacia plantation in Essex County, who had served as a cavalry officer and Aide de Camp to Gen. Pickett and who later wrote a memoir. In 1850, when this man Commanded the Gosport Navy Yard, the family included an enslaved woman aged 55 and a 17year old enslaved man.

== Later life, death and legacy ==
Retiring to his son-in-law's home in Essex County, Virginia, Barron took up farm life until he died at his home in Essex County on February 26, 1888.

Military offices
Preceded by Sidney Smith Lee	Commander of the James River Squadron; November 3, 1862 – March 1863	Succeeded by French Forrest
