= French corvette Prony =

French Navy corvette warship

History

France
- Name: Prony
- Owner: French Navy
- Launched: 23 September 1847
- Fate: Wrecked 5 November 1861

General characteristics
- Class & type: Corvette
- Tons burthen: c.700
- Installed power: 320 hp (240 kW)
- Propulsion: Sails, Steam engine
- Sail plan: Full-rigged ship
- Complement: 140
- Armament: 6 × 30-pounder cannons

Prony was a French Navy corvette warship during the American Civil War that ran aground and was lost off Ocracoke Inlet, North Carolina. It proved impossible to refloat the vessel, and efforts at assistance were hampered by both the weather and the fact that she had run aground in an area where Union and Confederate forces were opposing each other.

== History ==
Prony, a mixed sailing ship and steamer, was built in Brest from 1844 and launched in 1847 (Jacques Vichot, Répertoire des navires de guerre français, 1967, p. 111).

In 1854 it was sent to the South Seas along with a small fleet to claim possession of New Caledonia. Prony Bay is named after this ship.

== Loss ==
Prony had left New York harbor on 20 October with the intention of observing as a neutral the activity of the Union Navy blockading the port of Charleston. She arrived off Charleston on 30 October, staying there for two days before heading north, intending to return to New York. She was caught in a storm on 4 November off Ocracoke Inlet. Despite some efforts being made to save her, it proved impossible. No loss of life occurred.

At the time of her loss, Prony was under the command of Capitaine de corvette De Fontanges with a crew of 140 and 6 30-pound guns. She was of roughly 700 tons burthen and her engines were of 320 horsepower (240 kW).
