= 20th New York Infantry Regiment =

Military unit of the Union Army

- Active: April 29, 1861, to May 6, 1861 (New York State Service) and May 6, 1861, to June 1, 1863 (United States Service)
- Country: United States
- Allegiance: Union
- Branch: Infantry
- Engagements: Battle of Hatteras Inlet Batteries; Battle of White Oak Swamp; Battle of South Mountain; Battle of Antietam; Battle of Salem Church

The 20th New York Infantry Regiment, the "Turner Rifles", was an infantry regiment of the Union Army during the American Civil War.

== Service ==
The 20th New York Volunteer Infantry, also known as the "Turner Rifles," was recruited primarily in New York City, although several companies of the regiment were formed in upstate New York or New Jersey. The vast majority of recruits came from the various German-American Turner societies, with the largest number coming from New York City's Kleindeutschland neighborhood. The regiment was mustered into federal service for two years on May 6, 1861. After training in Manhattan's Turtle Bay Park, the unit left New York for Fortress Monroe, Virginia, on June 14, 1861. They departed with much fanfare, including a parade from Kleindeutschland to their transport ship and the presentation of both an American flag and the Black-Red-Gold flag of Germany's democratic revolutionaries, as well as a guide flag with the motto Bahn Frei ("Clear the Way"). To the dismay of the enlisted men, in whom was ingrained the German tradition of marksmanship, the regiment was issued with smoothbore muskets, though these would be replaced by rifles in 1862.

The Turners were renowned as good entertainers. For the 4th of July celebration in 1861, the regiment put several much-praised concerts, with improvised lighting displays and 50 barrels of lager. The Turners were also known to hold gymnastic performances, and their choral singing was popular even among Yankee soldiers.

While stationed at Fortress Monroe, General Benjamin Butler commanded a joint army-navy expedition to capture Confederate Forts Hatteras and Clark. In the ensuing Battle of Hatteras Inlet Batteries, a mixed amphibious force led by the 20th New York's commander, Colonel Max Weber, accepted the surrender of the two forts. The landing was a botched affair, in which high seas prevented the majority of the invasion force from landing and left a mere 318 men stranded on shore with inadequate provisions. The ensuing Union naval bombardment, however, forced the Confederate garrisons to surrender. The portion of the 20th which had taken part in the invasion remained in the vicinity of Forts Hatteras and Clark for several weeks, until reports reached Major General John Ellis Wool that soldiers from the regiment had committed "depredations and various outrages" on the inhabitants. Other sources suggest that the colonel of the 9th New York blamed the looting on the men of the 20th to protect the reputation of his own regiment, which had also participated.

Ernst von Vegesack in 1861.

On June 9, 1862, the 20th New York was transferred to the VI Corps of the Army of the Potomac in preparation for the Peninsula Campaign. The regiment did not engage in pitched battle until the Battle of White Oak Swamp, in which a Confederate artillery bombardment surprised the 20th New York as they were encamped. A significant number of the enlisted men and officers were routed, including the regiment's new commander, Colonel Francis Weiss. As one eyewitness and future Medal of Honor winner in the 7th Maine Infantry remembered, the soldiers of the 20th New York "wore high, conical, black hats, and when they broke and ran the plain was dotted far and wide with their hats and knapsacks. It is a tradition in our regiment that they are running still, and their colonel, who, days before, was talking about the blood he was going to shed, and who certainly led the wild flight several lengths, may not have stopped, for he was never heard from afterwards." Other officers at the brigade and divisional levels, however, reported that much of the regiment, though startled and disorganized, regrouped in the shelter of nearby woods to await the end of the bombardment. In the days following the debacle at White Oak Swamp, nine officers were forced to resign their commissions, and Colonel Ernst von Vegesack was appointed to command the unit. Weiss had been unpopular with his men, whom he considered "socialistic."

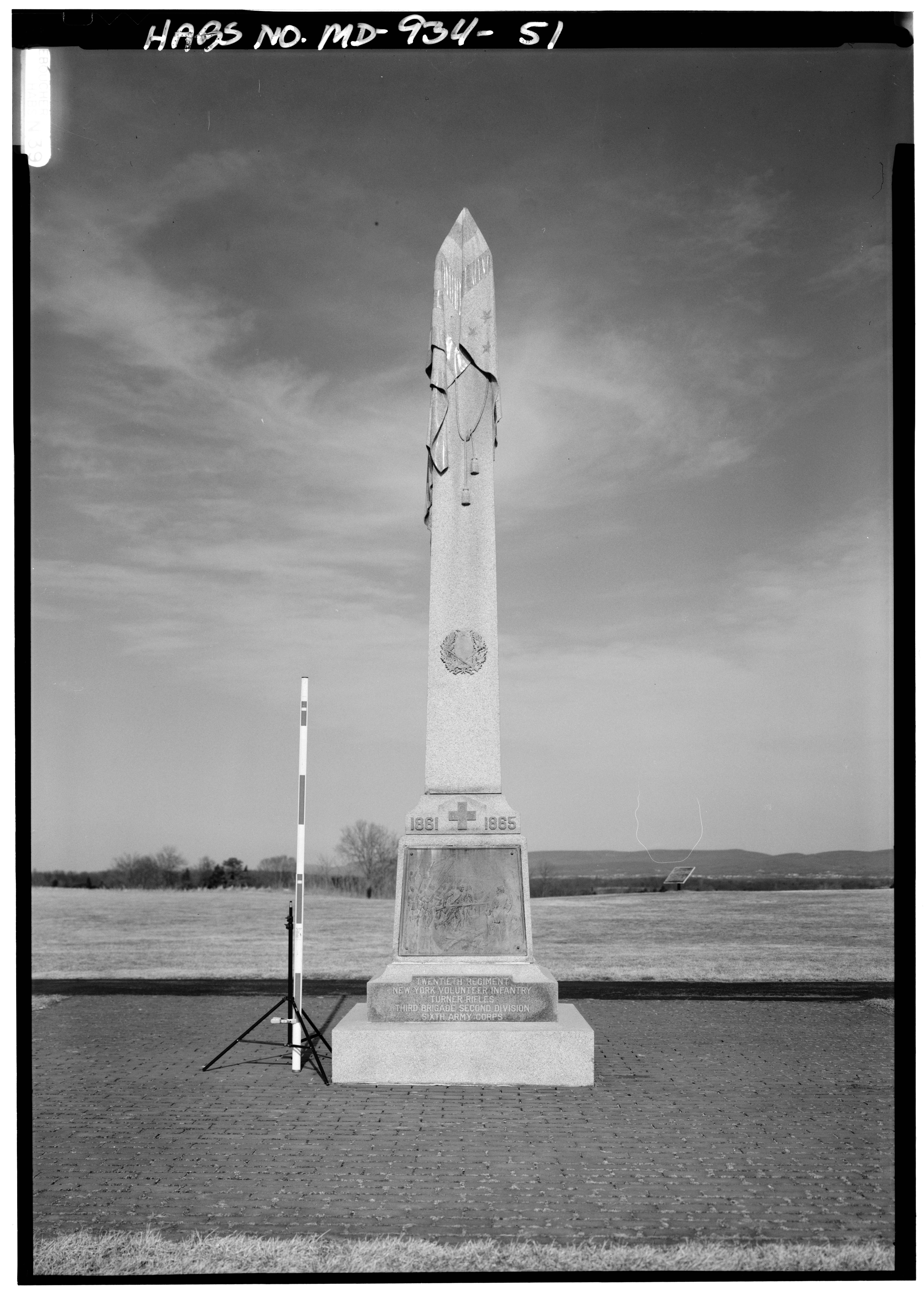
Monument to the 20th at Antietam

The 20th New York was not engaged in major combat again until the Battle of Antietam on September 17, 1862. The regiment incurred heavy losses, but their performance during the battle earned the unit praise from their superior officers. Their action in checking the final Confederate counterattack near Dunker Church even earned the praise of the observer who had criticized their flight at White Oak Swamp. After the war ended, the veterans of the 20th New York would dedicate two separate monuments to commemorate the actions of the unit at Antietam.

== Mutiny ==
As the 20th New York closed in on the end of its two years of service, questions arose as to whether the two years started from the point at which they were mustered into New York service or United States service. On April 29, 1863, the regiment was engaged in maneuvers which would lead to the Battle of Chancellorsville. This was a covert mission as ordered by Major General Joseph Hooker and as a result unknown to the Turners Rifles who in the rear of the encampment had stacked arms. When ordered to march toward the Rappahannock River, approximately two hundred men refused the marching order The Turners were quickly tried and convicted for mutiny in the face of the enemy, and sentenced to hard labor at Rip Raps. Lobbying efforts by Kleindeutschland elites and the support of Army of the Potomac Provost Marshal Marsena R. Patrick may in part have led to their sentence being commuted to dishonorable discharges, although these discharges were converted to honorable discharges by General Order of President Abraham Lincoln who agreed the men had a legitimate complaint. Because the military later rendered this decision “Inoperative” in order to deny the veterans pensions, it necessitated public outcry and a declaration by the war department and a law passed by Congress in 1905.

The remainder of the regiment crossed the Rappahannock and participated in the Battle of Salem Church, in which the unit incurred higher casualties than at any other battle. The survivors of the regiment returned to New York City and were mustered out on June 1, 1863.

== Casualties ==
Over the course of its service, 61 officers and men were killed or mortally wounded in battle. An additional 58 officers and enlisted men died of disease.

== See also ==
- List of New York Civil War regiments
