= Goshen, New Jersey =

Populated place in Cape May County, New Jersey, US

- Census-designated place
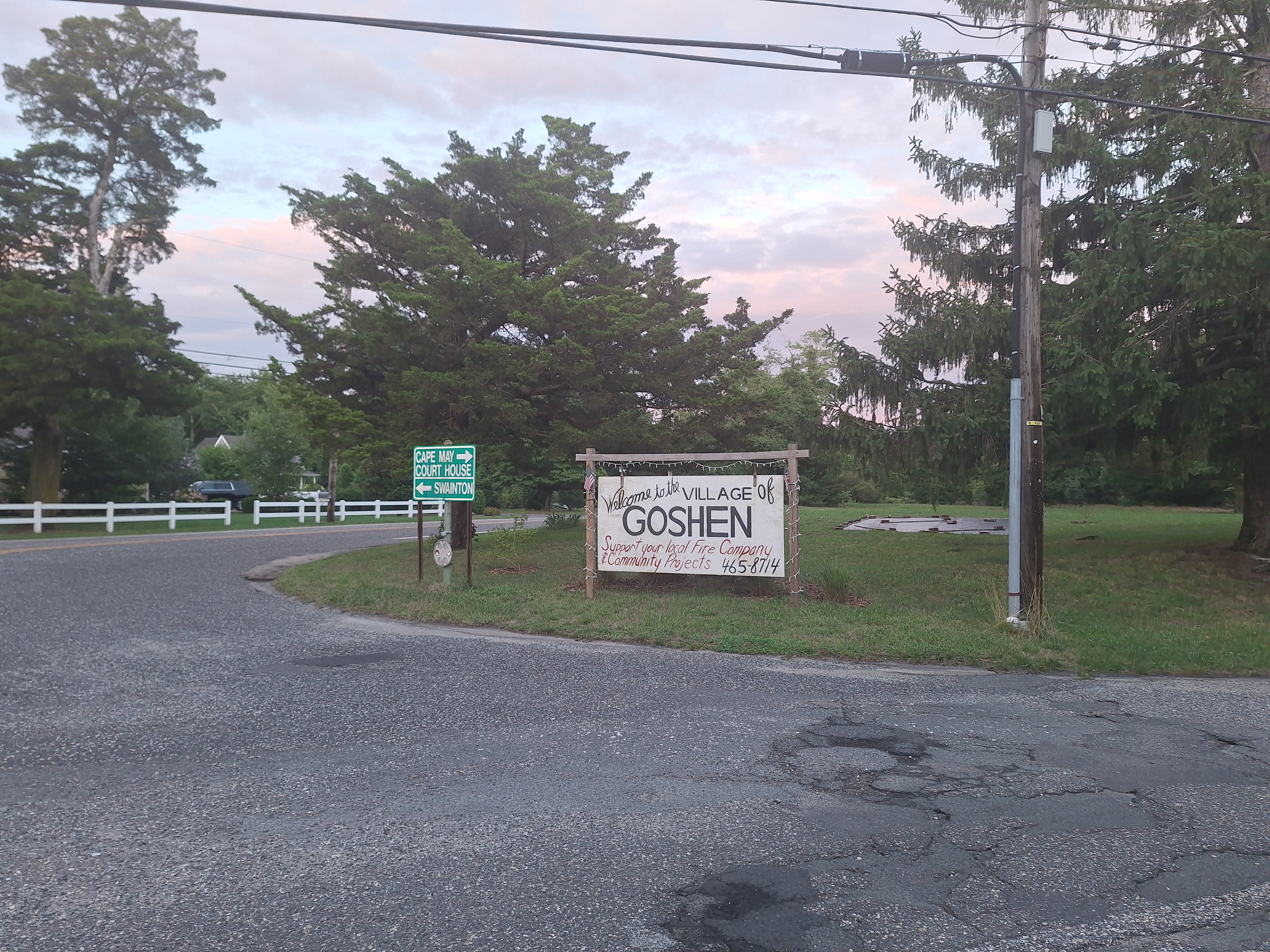
- Sign stating the community's name

- Location in Cape May County Location in New Jersey Location in the United States
- Coordinates: 39°08′29″N 74°51′11″W
- Country: United States
- State: New Jersey
- County: Cape May
- Township: Middle

Area
  - Total: 1.75 sq mi (4.53 km^{2})
  - Land: 1.75 sq mi (4.52 km^{2})
  - Water: 0.0039 sq mi (0.01 km^{2})
- Elevation: 9.8 ft (3 m)

Population (2020)
  - Total: 400
  - Density: 229.1/sq mi (88.47/km^{2})
- ZIP Code: 08210
- FIPS code: 34-27030
- GNIS feature ID: 0876685

Goshen is an unincorporated community and census-designated place (CDP) located within Middle Township, in Cape May County, in the U.S. state of New Jersey. As of the 2020 census, Goshen had a population of 400.

Route 47, also known as Delsea Drive, runs directly through the center of the community.

== History ==
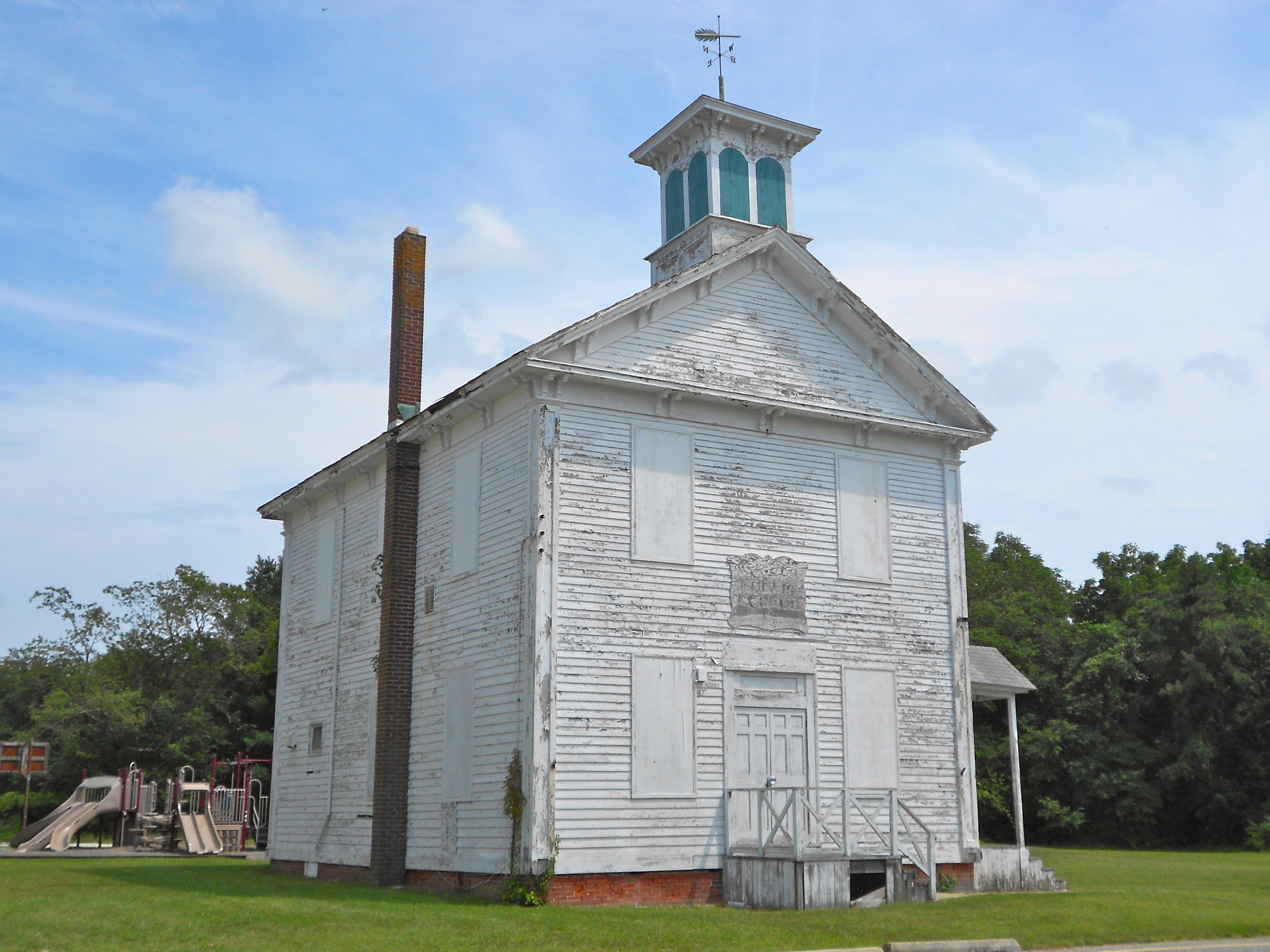
Goshen School, listed on the National Register of Historic Places

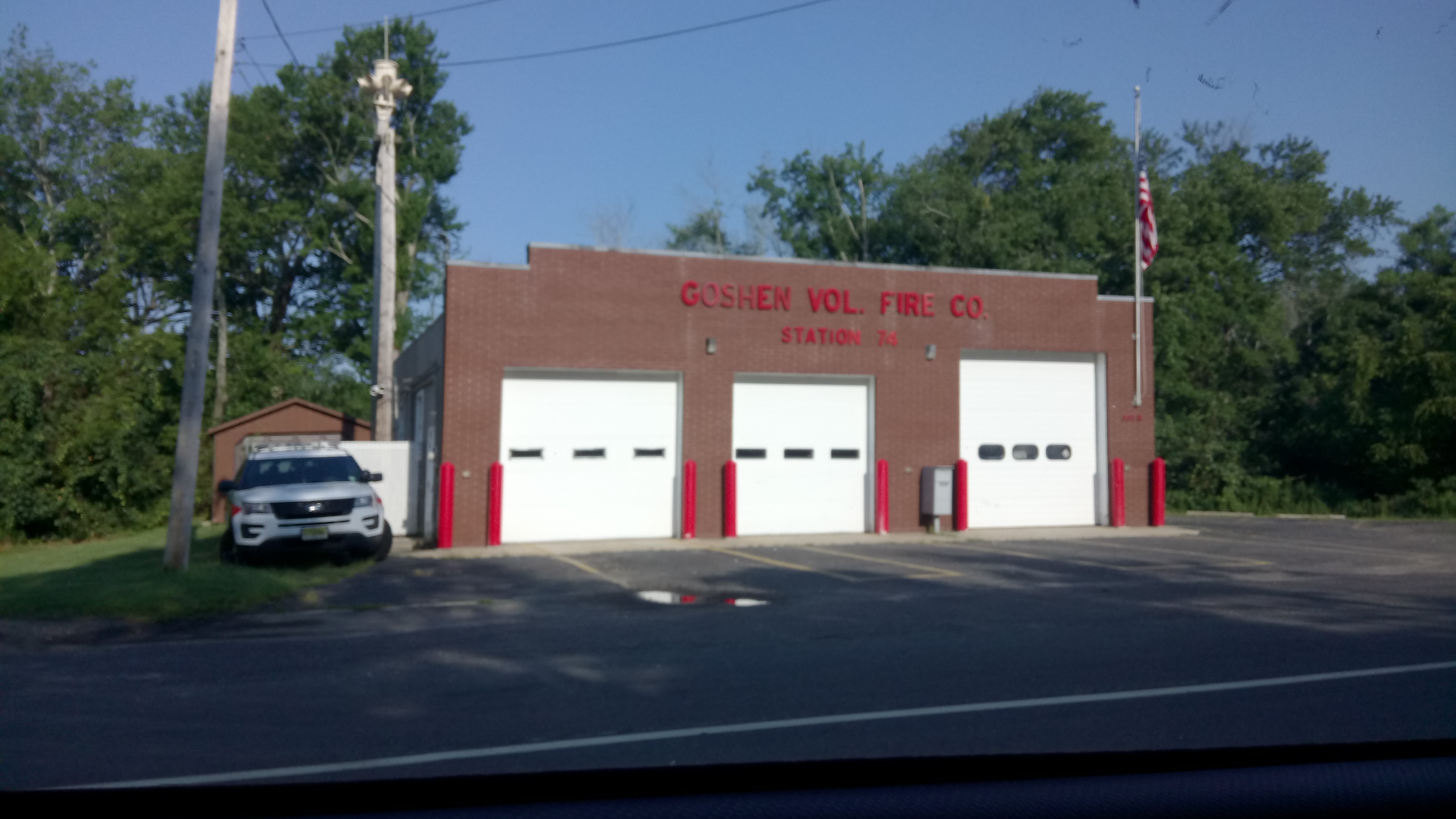
Goshen Fire Station

The area was settled by Aaron Leaming, who began raising cattle in 1693. By 1710 there was a settlement. Goshen's first industry was a king crab mill and a canning factory. Shipbuilding and lumbering industries flourished. A post office was established in 1818, with Richard Thompson Jr. as the first postmaster.

The Garrison shipyard on Goshen Creek had stocks for the simultaneous construction of two vessels, which, upon being launched, were slipped into the water sideways. Between 1859 and 1898, twenty-five ships of record were built there, along with many smaller craft. Around 1900, Cape May County's shipbuilding industry was shut down. The last ship launched by the Goshen shipyard was the Diamond in 1898. Due to the lasting effects of the brackish water there, the remains of the docks are still visible at the end of Goshen Landing Road during low tide.

The Tavern House (circa 1725), on the corner of Route 47 and Goshen Landing Road, is one of the oldest homes in Cape May County. At different times it has been a tavern, hotel, dentist office and residence. While significant changes have been made, much of the original workmanship is still evident. Rough-hewn logs still support the house, and wooden pegs hold the rafters in place.

== Demographics ==
Historical population
Census	Pop.	Note	%±
2020	400		—
U.S. Decennial Census; 2020

Goshen was first listed as a census designated place in the 2020 U.S. census.

Goshen CDP, New Jersey – Racial and ethnic composition Note: the US Census treats Hispanic/Latino as an ethnic category. This table excludes Latinos from the racial categories and assigns them to a separate category. Hispanics/Latinos may be of any race.
Race / Ethnicity (NH = Non-Hispanic)	Pop 2020	2020
White alone (NH)	333	83.25%
Black or African American alone (NH)	14	3.50%
Native American or Alaska Native alone (NH)	2	0.50%
Asian alone (NH)	3	0.75%
Native Hawaiian or Pacific Islander alone (NH)	0	0.00%
Other race alone (NH)	3	0.75%
Mixed race or Multiracial (NH)	19	4.75%
Hispanic or Latino (any race)	26	6.50%
Total	400	100.00%

As of 2020, the area had a population of 400.

== Education ==
Residents of Goshen attend the Middle Township Public Schools, which operates Middle Township High School.

Countywide schools include Cape May County Technical High School and Cape May County Special Services School District.

== Notable people ==
People who were born in, residents of, or otherwise closely associated with Goshen include:

- Andrew J. Tomlin (1845–1906), awarded the Medal of Honor for his actions in the Civil War.

== Wineries ==
- Natali Vineyards
