= Battle of Hatteras Inlet Batteries =

1861 battle of the American Civil War

- Part of the American Civil War
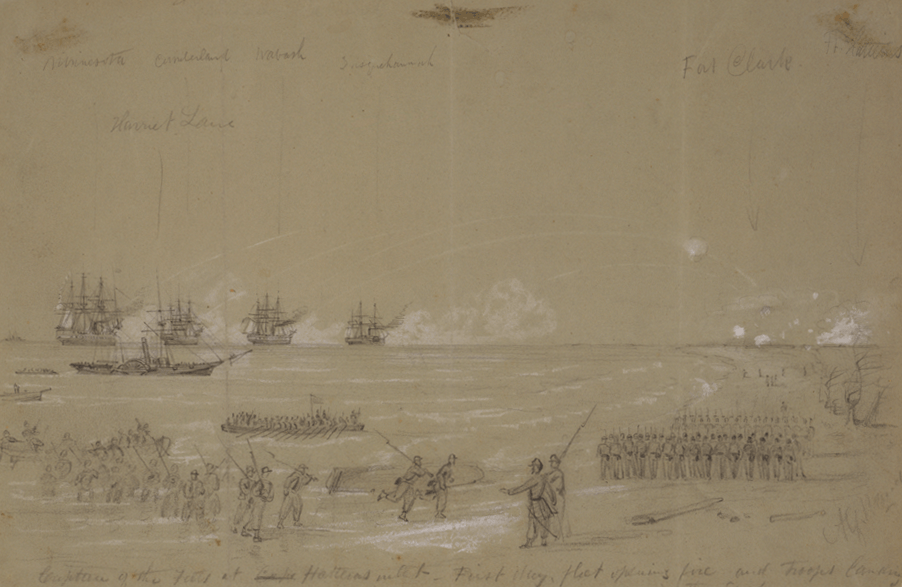
- Capture of the Forts at Cape Hatteras inlet Alfred Waud, artist, August 28, 1861
Date	August 28–29, 1861
Location	Outer Banks off North Carolina, near Cape Hatteras 35°11′N 75°44′W
Result	Union victory

Belligerents
United States (Union)	Confederate States

Commanders and leaders
Silas H. Stringham; Benjamin F. Butler	Samuel Barron (surrendered); William F. Martin

Units involved
9th New York Infantry; 20th New York Infantry; Atlantic Blockading Squadron; U.S. Marines	17th North Carolina Infantry Regiment; Hatteras Island Garrison; Unspecified naval volunteers

Strength
7 warships 935 men	900 men

Casualties and losses
1 killed 2 wounded	4 killed 20 wounded 691 captured

The Battle of Hatteras Inlet Batteries (August 28–29, 1861) was the first combined operation of the Union Army and Navy in the American Civil War, resulting in Union domination of the strategically important North Carolina Sounds.

Two forts on the Outer Banks, Fort Clark and Fort Hatteras, had been built by the Confederates to protect their commerce-raiding activity. These were lightly defended, however, and their artillery could not engage the bombarding fleet under Flag Officer Silas H. Stringham, commandant of the Atlantic Blockading Squadron, which had been ordered to keep moving, to avoid presenting a static target. Although held up by bad weather, the fleet was able to land troops under General Benjamin Butler, who took the surrender of Flag Officer Samuel Barron.

This battle represented the first application of the naval blockading strategy. The Union retained both forts, providing valuable access to the sounds, and commerce raiding was much reduced. The victory was welcomed by a demoralized Northern public after the humiliating First Battle of Bull Run. The engagement is sometimes known as the Battle of Forts Hatteras and Clark.

== Hatteras Inlet in Confederate hands ==
The North Carolina Sounds occupy most of the coast from Cape Lookout (North Carolina) to the Virginia border. With their eastern borders marked by the Outer Banks, they were almost ideally located for raiding Northern maritime commerce. Cape Hatteras, the easternmost point in the Confederacy, is within sight of the Gulf Stream, which moves at a speed of about 3 knots (1.5 m/s) at this latitude. Ships in the Caribbean trade would reduce the time of their homeward journeys to New York, Philadelphia, or Boston by riding the stream to the north. Raiders, either privateers or state-owned vessels, could lie inside, protected from both the weather and from Yankee blockaders, until an undefended victim appeared. Watchers stationed at the Hatteras lighthouse would then signal a raider, which would dash out and make a capture, often being able to return the same day.

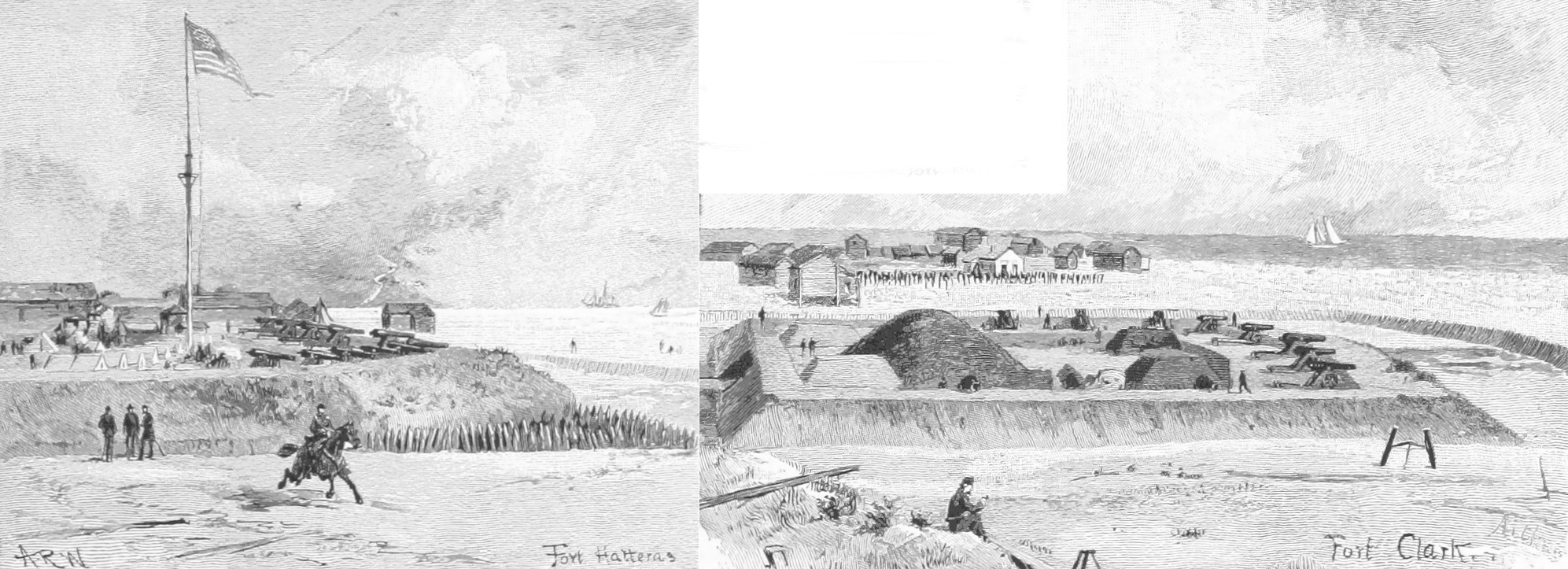
Fort Hatteras (left) and Fort Clark, from wartime sketches

To protect the raiders from Federal reprisal, the state of North Carolina immediately after seceding from the Union established forts at the inlets, waterways that allowed entrance to and egress from the sounds. In 1861, only four inlets were deep enough for ocean-going vessels to pass: Beaufort, Ocracoke, Hatteras, and Oregon Inlets. Hatteras Inlet was the most important of these, so it was given two forts, named Fort Hatteras and Fort Clark Fort Hatteras was sited adjacent to the inlet, on the sound side of Hatteras Island. Fort Clark was about half a mile (800 m) to the southeast, closer to the Atlantic Ocean. The forts were not very strong; Fort Hatteras had only ten guns mounted by the end of August, with another five guns in the fort but not mounted. Fort Clark had only five. Furthermore, most of the guns were rather light 32-pounders or smaller, of limited range and inadequate for coastal defense. The installations' water and powder supplies were also poor.

The personnel problem was even worse. North Carolina had raised and equipped 22 infantry regiments to serve in the war, but 16 of these had been drawn off for the campaigns in Virginia. The six regiments remaining were responsible for the defense of the entire North Carolina coastline. Only a fraction of one regiment, the 7th North Carolina Volunteers, occupied the two forts at Hatteras Inlet. The other forts were likewise only weakly held. Fewer than a thousand men garrisoned Forts Ocracoke, Hatteras, Clark, and Oregon. Reinforcements, if needed, would have to come from as far away as Beaufort.

Strangely, the military authorities in North Carolina did little to keep the poor state of their defenses secret. Several Yankee captains, victims of either capture or shipwreck, were loosely detained at or near Hatteras Island while awaiting return to their homes. They were allowed virtually free access to the forts, and made mental notes of everything. When they returned to the North, at least two of them gave full and valuable descriptions to the Navy Department.

== Northern reaction ==
The depredations on Northern commerce emanating from Hatteras Inlet could not pass unnoticed. Insurance underwriters pressured Union Secretary of the Navy Gideon Welles for remedy. Welles needed no prodding. He already had on his desk a report from the Blockade Strategy Board suggesting a way to perfect the blockade of the North Carolina coast. The board recommended that the coast be rendered useless to the South by sinking old, useless, ballast-laden ships in the inlets to block them. (Note: Their reports also contained a statement that is easily overlooked: "These plans may undergo some modification in the hands of the person to whom their execution shall be intrusted.")

Soon after he received the board's report, Secretary Welles began to implement its recommendation. He ordered Commander H. S. Stellwagen to go to the Chesapeake Bay to buy some suitable old hulks. At the same time, he was told to report his activities to Flag Officer Silas H. Stringham, commandant of the Atlantic Blockading Squadron. As such, he was the naval officer in charge of the blockade of the North Carolina coast. This was the first involvement of Stringham with what was to become the attack at Hatteras Inlet. In time, he would become the most important person in the expedition.

Stringham opposed the plan to block the inlets from the beginning. He believed that the tidal currents would either sweep the impediments away or would rapidly scour new channels. As he saw it, the Rebels could not be denied access to the sounds unless the inlets were actually held by the Union. In other words, in order to establish an effective blockade in this part of North Carolina, the forts that the state had set up would have to be captured. Since the Navy could not do it alone, the cooperation of the Army would be needed.

As it happened, the Army was willing to cooperate. Its willingness had something to do with the political general Benjamin F. Butler, who was a political force that had to be dealt with, but was already emerging (Note: According to the virtually unanimous consensus of historians) as militarily incompetent. Butler was ordered to assemble a force of some 800 men for the expedition. He soon had 880: 500 from the German-speaking 20th New York Volunteers, 220 from the 9th New York Volunteers, 100 from the Union Coast Guard (an Army unit, actually the 99th New York Volunteers;), and 20 army regulars from the 2nd U.S. Artillery. The men were put aboard two of the vessels that Commander Stellwagen had purchased, Adelaide and George Peabody. When objection was made that the two ships would not be able to survive a Hatteras storm, Stellwagen pointed out that the expedition could proceed only in fair weather anyway, as a storm would prevent landings.

While Butler was gathering his forces, Flag Officer Stringham was also making preparations. Somehow he learned that the War Department orders to Butler's superior, Major General John E. Wool, had contained the statement, "The expedition originated in the Navy Department, and is under its control." Reasoning that he would be blamed if anything went wrong, he decided to follow his own plans. He selected seven warships for the expedition: USS Minnesota, Cumberland, Susquehanna, Wabash, Pawnee, Monticello, and Harriet Lane. All but the last were ships of the U.S. Navy; Harriet Lane was a revenue cutter, part of the US Revenue Cutter Service. He also included in his force the armed steam tug Fanny, needed to tow some of the surf boats that would be used for the landing.

On August 26, the flotilla, less Susquehanna and Cumberland, departed Hampton Roads and moved down the coast to the vicinity of Cape Hatteras. On the way, they were joined by Cumberland. They swung around the Cape on 27 August and anchored near the inlet, in full view of the defenders there. Colonel William F. Martin of the 17th North Carolina Infantry, commanding at Forts Hatteras and Clark, knew that his 580 or so men would need help, so he called for reinforcements from Forts Ocracoke and Oregon. Unfortunately for him and his garrison, communication among the forts was slow, and the first reinforcements did not arrive until late the next day, when it was too late.

== Opposing forces ==
=== Union ===
Department of Virginia – MG. Benjamin F. Butler

- 9th New York Infantry Regiment – Col. Rush Hawkins (220 men)
- 20th New York Infantry Regiment – Col. Max Weber (500 men)
- 99th New York Volunteer Infantry Regiment ("Union Coast Guard") – Cpt. William Nixon (100 men)
- Detachment, 2nd US Artillery Regiment – Lt. Frank H. Larned (60 men)
- Detachments of sailors and marines from the fleet

Atlantic Blockading Squadron – Flag Officer Silas H. Stringham

- USS Monticello (1859)
- USS Harriet Lane
- USS Minnesota (1855)
- USS Wabash (1855)
- USS Susquehanna (1850)
- USS Cumberland (1842)
- USS Pawnee (1859)

=== Confederate ===
- 17th North Carolina Infantry Regiment, – Col. William F. Martin
- Fort Hatteras Garrison – Col. Andrews
- Unspecified naval volunteers, including Flag Officer Samuel Barron

== Battle ==
=== First day, to sunset ===
Early on the morning of 28 August, USS Minnesota, USS Wabash, and USS Cumberland began to bombard Fort Clark, while the lighter warships accompanied the transports to a point about three miles (5 km) to the east, where the troops began disembarking. Stringham kept his ships moving in a loop, with Wabash towing Cumberland. At 11:00 a.m., the USS Susquehanna—steaming towards Hampton Roads on a return voyage from the West Indies—happened upon the scene and was ordered to join the bombardment. The ships would deliver their broadsides against the fort, move back out of range to reload, and then come back in to fire again. By remaining in motion, they did not let the artillerymen in the fort correct their aim between shots, and thereby negated much of the traditional advantage of shore-based guns over those on ships. This tactic had been used previously by the British and French at the siege of Sevastopol in the Crimean War, but this was the first time it was used by the US Navy.

The return fire from Fort Clark was ineffectual, either falling short or passing overhead, and no hits were made on the bombarding ships. Shortly after noon, the defenders ran low on ammunition, and about 12:25 p.m. they ran out completely. At this point, they abandoned the fort, some fleeing to Fort Hatteras, while others took to boats. Col. Max Weber, commanding the Federal troops already on shore, noted this and put some men in to take possession, but the fleet did not know this and continued firing for another five minutes. It was during this interval of confusion that the landing force suffered its only casualty, one of the soldiers being seriously wounded in the hand by a shell fragment. Fortunately, some of the troops were able to get the attention of the gunners on the ships by waving a large American flag, and the bombardment stopped with no further harm done. Stringham and his captains then turned their attention to Fort Hatteras.

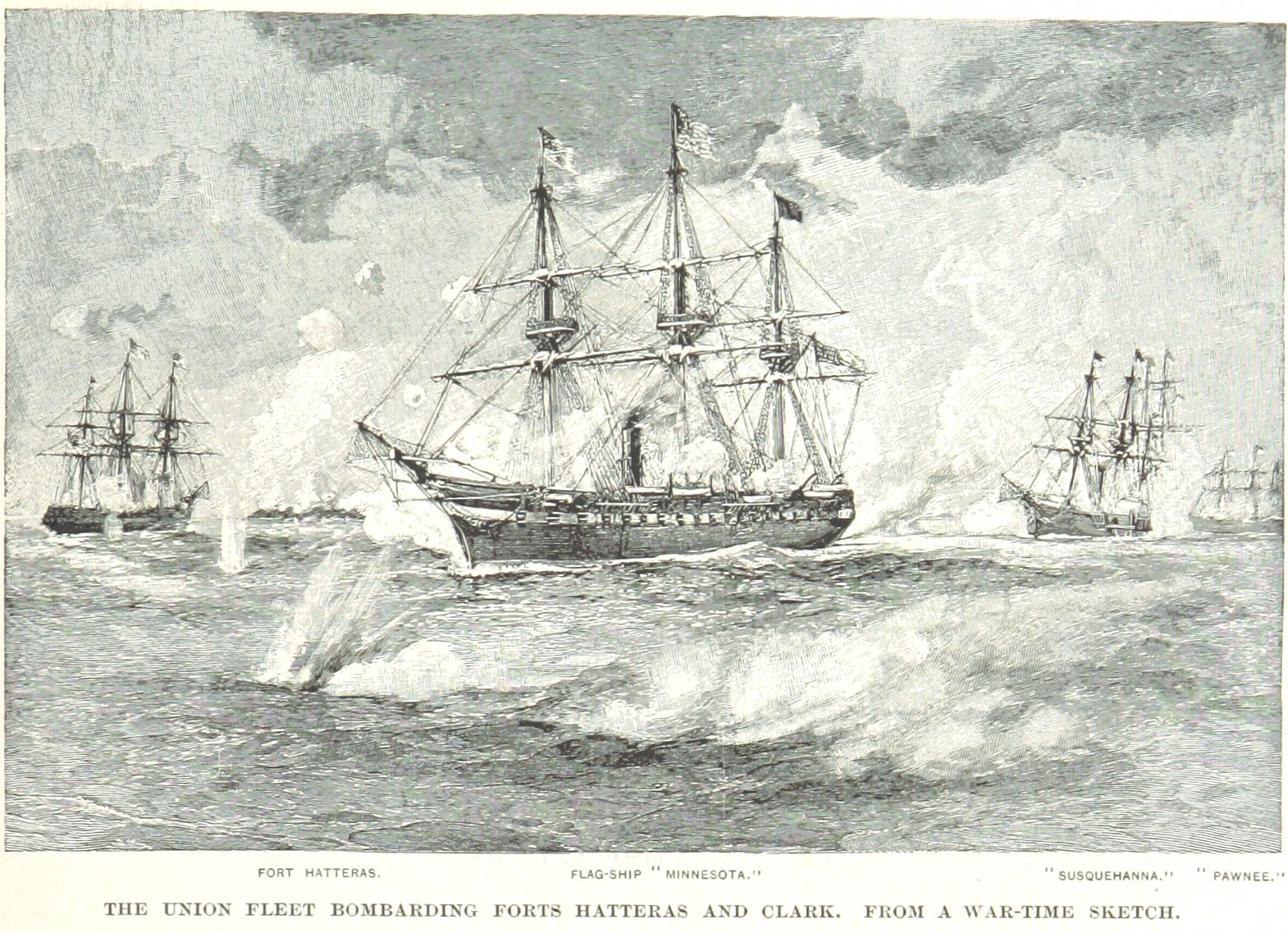
The Union fleet bombards Fort Hatteras

Meanwhile, the landings were not going well. Only about a third of the troops were ashore when rising winds produced surf that swamped and overturned the landing boats, and General Butler had to suspend further attempts to land. Colonel Weber found that he had only 318 men with him. The number included 102 from his own regiment, the 20th New York, but also 68 from the 9th New York, 28 from the Union Coast Guard, 45 artillerymen, 45 marines, and 28 sailors who could man heavy guns. With several field pieces that they had managed to wrestle ashore through the surf, they could reasonably well defend themselves against a Confederate counterattack, but they were too weak to mount an attack on Fort Hatteras.

At Fort Hatteras, Stringham kept his ships moving as he had done at Fort Clark. The defenders tried to conserve their ammunition by firing only sporadically, so Stringham thought that perhaps the fort had been abandoned. (No flag was flying. Before the battle, the old flag had been reduced to tatters, and was never replaced.) He sent Monticello into the inlet to sound it out, but then the fort came again to life. The ship grounded while trying to extricate herself, and in this condition she was struck by five shots. None of these did any permanent damage, although several sailors received minor wounds.

As the day came to a close, the fleet drew off in the face of threatening weather, the exhausted defenders looked for reinforcements, and the Federal troops ashore went to sleep supperless, with water running low, and dreading the reinforcements that their opponents hoped for.

=== After sunset, and second day ===
Sometime after dark, reinforcements began to arrive at the fort. The gunboat CSS Warren Winslow brought in some of the garrison from Fort Ocracoke, and some of the sailors also stayed to help man the guns. This brought the number of men in the fort up to more than 700, with more expected from New Bern. Accompanying the additional troops was Flag Officer Samuel Barron, commanding the coast defenses of North Carolina and Virginia. Colonel Martin, pleading exhaustion, requested Barron to assume command. He did so, still believing that with the additional troops from New Bern they would be able to retake Fort Clark.

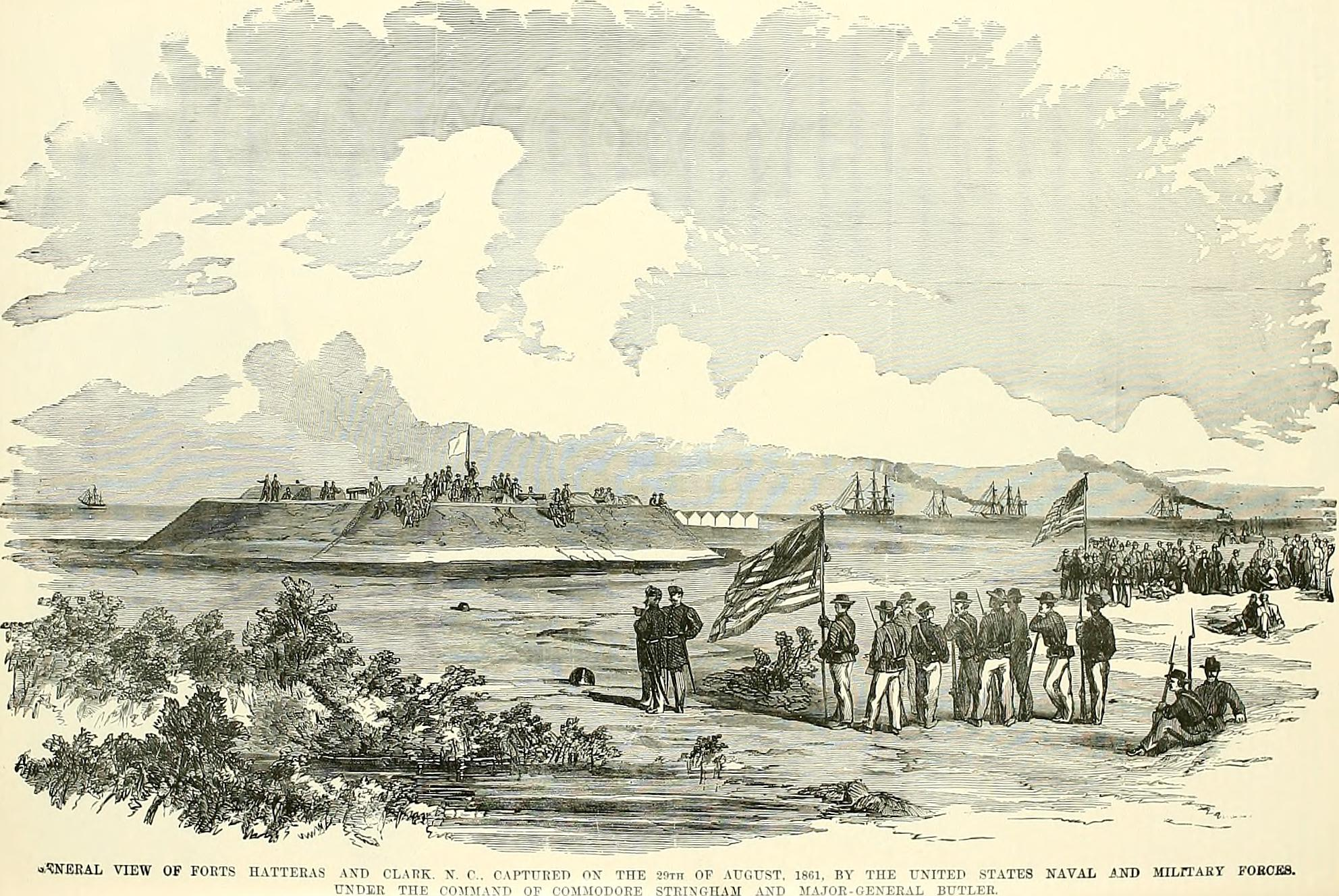
Fort Hatteras surrenders

Dawn of the second day blasted the hopes of the defenders. The weather moderated enough that the Union fleet could return and resume its bombardment; they were also able to drive off the transport bringing reinforcements. (Somehow a ship was able to get in, but rather than bringing in more troops she carried away some of the wounded.) The fleet initially kept in motion, but they soon found that they were out of range of the guns in the fort. After that, the ships did not alter their positions, but poured their fire into the fort with no danger of reply. There was nothing the men in the forts could do except endure. After about three hours, Barron called a council of the officers, and they decided to seek terms, even though casualties had been quite light. (The actual numbers of dead and wounded are known only very imprecisely. Various reports give the number of dead as from four to seven, and the wounded as from 20 to 45) At a little after 11:00 a.m., the white flag was shown. Butler insisted upon surrender, which Barron agreed to. The battle came to a close, and the survivors went into prisoner-of-war camps. The list of prisoners had 691 names, including those wounded but not evacuated.

== Aftermath ==
=== Military consequences ===
The loss of Cape Hatteras diminished Confederate commerce-raiding prospects, exposed the Pamlico Sound to federal incursion, and increased the effectiveness of the federal blockade. Colonel Rush Hawkins was left in command of the federal garrison at Hatteras, which comprised detachments of the 9th New York Infantry Regiment, elements of the 20th New York Infantry Regiment, and a half-company of the Union Coast Guard. Additionally, the ships Pawnee, Monticello, and Fanny remained in the vicinity. Butler and Stringham left immediately after the battle, the former to Washington and the latter accompanying the prisoners to New York. Critics argued that each was trying to gather credit for the victory to himself. The pair contended, however, that they were trying to persuade the administration to abandon the original plan to block up Hatteras Inlet. In Federal hands it was no longer useful to the Confederacy, and in fact now allowed Union forces to pursue raiders into the sounds. Although they and their supporters continued to press the case for several weeks, it seems to have been unnecessary. The War and Navy Departments had already decided to retain possession of the inlet, which would be used as the entry point of an amphibious expedition against the North Carolina mainland early the next year. This campaign, known as Burnside's North Carolina Expedition for its senior Army commander Ambrose E. Burnside, completely removed the sounds as sources of commerce-raiding activity.

Continued U.S. possession of Hatteras Inlet was considerably aided by the Confederate authorities, who early decided that the Ocracoke and Oregon batteries were indefensible, so they were abandoned. Confederate defenses in the region reoriented around their garrison at Roanoke Island, while the Mosquito Fleet confined itself to the Albemarle Sound.

Stringham's tactic of keeping his ships in motion while bombarding forts was used later by Flag Officer Samuel Francis Du Pont at Port Royal, South Carolina. The effectiveness of the practice led to a reconsideration of the value of fixed forts against naval gunnery.

=== Political consequences ===
News of the federal victory at Hatteras boosted the morale of Unionists in the North. Locally, residents in the coastal region—many of whom were disillusioned with the war from its onset—began expressing Unionist sentiments. One Hatteras pastor, Marble Nash Taylor, reported that this was largely done to discourage federal troops from looting their property. Some Hatteras islanders traveled to the Hyde County mainland to promote the Union cause and gather intelligence, for which eight were ultimately arrested. Reports in the Northern press boasted that the political displays of the Hatteras Islanders were evidence of strong Unionist feeling throughout the state. Encouraged by the news, President Abraham Lincoln issued an order on September 16 allowing for the recruitment of locals into the U.S. Army. About 50 to 60 Hatteras men subsequently enlisted and eventually became a company of the 1st North Carolina Infantry Regiment and were attached to the garrisons of Fort Hatteras and Fort Clark.

In the South, reaction to the Confederate loss of Hatteras was sullen. The Confederate Congress passed a resolution demanding a report on the island's capture. Governor of North Carolina Henry Toole Clark wrote Confederate Secretary of War LeRoy Pope Walker to ask for additional troops to ward off further federal advances. When Walker demurred, Clark wrote again to ask for arms and powder, saying, "I desire to impress upon the Confederate Government the great and pressing importance of defending the coast of North Carolina." The governor's entreaties had minimal effect, though General Benjamin Huger did eventually dispatch a detachment of troops from Norfolk to reinforce the garrison at Roanoke Island. Clark also appealed to the North Carolina General Assembly for assistance. In turn, it appropriated money to purchase and arm five boats to defend the state's sounds and equip a battalion of marine artillery.

Criticism of Clark increased in the aftermath of the loss of Hatteras, with several figures blaming him for the outcome or accusing him of responding inadequately. The weakness of North Carolina's coastal defenses was among several reasons that North Carolina Standard editor William Woods Holden—whose son, Joseph, was captured at Hatteras—decided to create the Conservative Party to challenge the incumbent political faction in the state's 1862 elections.

== Occupation ==
In 1864, the Union Army decommissioned Fort Clark and folded its garrison into Fort Hatteras.

== Notes ==
Abbreviations used in these notes:

ORA (Official records, armies): War of the Rebellion: a compilation of the official records of the Union and Confederate Armies.
ORN (Official records, navies): Official records of the Union and Confederate Navies in the War of the Rebellion.
