= Henry Smith Craven =

American inventor (1845–1889)

Henry Smith Craven (14 October 1845, Bound Brook, New Jersey – 7 December 1889, Brooklyn, New York) was an American inventor, civil and military engineer.

== Biography ==
He was a son of Thomas Tingey Craven, a United States Navy officer. He studied in St. John's College, Annapolis, Maryland, and later in the scientific department of Hobart College, but did not graduate, since he entered the United States Army shortly before the close of the Civil War. He later received an honorary degree of B.S. from Hobart in 1878.

He obtained employment on the Croton works in New York City, but in 1866 went to California and became secretary, with the rank of lieutenant, to his father, then commanding the North Pacific Squadron, and in 1869 was appointed assistant civil engineer of the navy yard at Mare Island. This office he resigned in 1872, and then practiced his profession in San Francisco until 1879. He was commissioned civil engineer in the U. S. Navy during the latter year, and ordered to Chester, Pennsylvania, where he was occupied with the construction of the iron floating dock then building for the Pensacola Navy Yard. Later he was ordered to the navy yard at League Island, Pennsylvania, and in July 1881, was sent to the navy yard at Portsmouth, New Hampshire, and in September 1882, assigned to special duty at Coaster's Harbor Training Station. He was granted leave of absence in 1883, and took charge of the construction of the new Croton aqueduct in New York, up to March 1886.

He invented an automatic trip for mining buckets (1876), and a tunneling machine (1883). He was a member of the American Society of Civil Engineers.
