= Charles H. Craven =

United States Navy officer

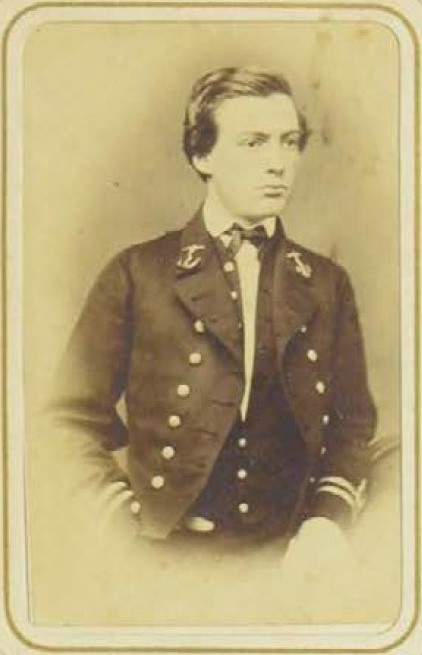
C. H. Craven at the Naval Academy

Charles Henderson Craven (November 30, 1843 – March 1, 1898) was an officer of the United States Navy.

== Biography ==
He was a son of Thomas Tingey Craven. He was born at Fort Preble in South Portland, Maine on November 30, 1843. He was appointed to the United States Naval Academy from Maine on September 20, 1860. He graduated on May 2, 1863 during the American Civil War.

Craven was promoted to ensign, and served in that capacity in the South Atlantic Blockading Squadron until 1865. He participated in many of the engagements in the vicinity of Charleston and Savannah during 1863/64, and was attached to the USS Housatonic when she was blown up in February 1864. Promoted to master in 1865, Craven served in the European Squadron on the USS Colorado until 1867. He was commissioned lieutenant in November 1866. He then served on the USS Wampanoag, and was made lieutenant commander in March 1868, after which he was attached to the Pacific Squadron.

Subsequently, he served on shore duty at Mare Island, California. In 1874 he became executive officer of the USS Kearsarge, of the Pacific Squadron, and later of the USS Monocacy.

Craven was detached from duty in June 1879, broken down by overwork, and was retired in May 1881. He died on March 1, 1898, in Washington, D.C. Craven and his wife Mary Folger (Shepard) Craven are buried at Arlington National Cemetery.
