= Chicamacomico Races =

1861 battle of the American Civil War in North Carolina

- Part of the American Civil War
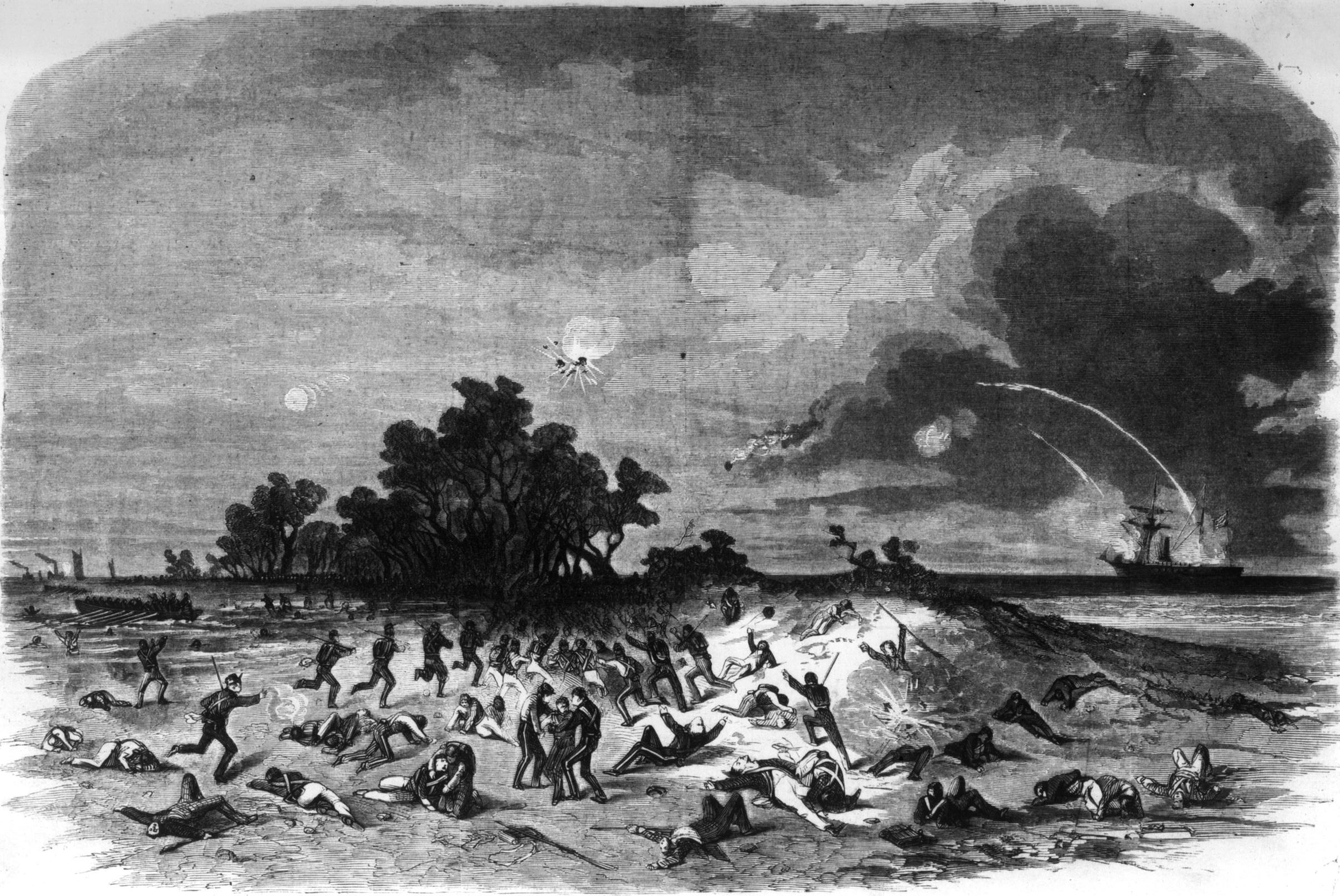
- The USS Monticello bombarding Confederate troops near Kinnakeet, October 6, 1861
Date	October 5–6, 1861
Location	Hatteras Island, North Carolina, U.S.
Result	Inconclusive
Territorial changes	Federal forces withdraw from Chicamacomico

Belligerents
United States	Confederate States

Commanders and leaders
Rush Hawkins; W. L. Brown	Ambrose R. Wright; Henry M. Shaw; William F. Lynch

The Chicamacomico Races or Chicamacomico Affair was an engagement of the American Civil War which took place over the course of October 5 and October 6, 1861. Following the capture of Hatteras Island by Union forces in August, Confederate troops concentrated their defenses in the region on Roanoke Island. To guard against a Confederate assault from that base, U.S. Army Colonel Rush C. Hawkins dispatched the 12th Indiana Regiment to occupy the village of Chicamacomico on the north end of Hatteras. Upon learning of the federal encampment there, Confederate forces under Colonel Ambrose R. Wright planned an offensive to trap the 12th Indiana Regiment and then push south down the island and attack the federal garrison at their captured forts.

On October 5, 1861, a Confederate flotilla sailed to Chicamacomico to land troops north and south of the 12th Indiana Regiment. The Indianans retreated down the length of the island. While the Confederate Third Georgia Regiment was able to land to their north and engage in a pursuit, the southward bound troops of the Confederate trap were unable to make it to shore. The 12th Indiana Regiment reached the lighthouse at Cape Hatteras and made camp for the night, as did the pursuing Confederates at the village of Kinnakeet. The following morning, the 9th New York Infantry Regiment reached the cape and began pursuing the Confederates northward. The USS Monticello also bombarded the Confederate column. After marching 13 miles, the federal forces gave up their pursuit. The conflict was strategically inconclusive, and both belligerents withdrew to their respective strongholds.

== Background ==
=== Capture of Cape Hatteras ===
Following the outbreak of the American Civil War and North Carolina's secession to the Confederate States of America in 1861, Fort Clark and Fort Hatteras were constructed at the southern end of Hatteras Island to defend it. In late August, a combined operation of the U.S. Navy and U.S. Army led to the capture the forts for the federal government. With the fall of Hatteras, the Confederates quickly abandoned their other positions in the region and reoriented their defenses around their garrison at Roanoke Island. The Third Georgia Regiment of the Confederate States Army, led by Colonel Ambrose R. Wright and in transit towards Hatteras at the time of its capture, was redirected to Roanoke.

=== Capture of the Fanny and plans for Confederate offensive ===
Colonel Rush C. Hawkins of the 9th New York Infantry Regiment was left in command of the federal garrison at Hatteras Island. Over the weeks following its seizure his troops focused on strengthening their defenses while naval forces investigated and destroyed abandoned Confederate fortifications in the region. The 20th New York Infantry Regiment was replaced by the 12th Indiana Regiment under Colonel W. L. Brown. Wary of a potential Confederate attack from Roanoke southward down the length of Hatteras Island and eager to protect local Unionist civilians, Hawkins dispatched Brown's approximately 600 men to its northward end in late September and ordered them to establish positions at Chicamacomico. Chicamacomico was approximately 27 miles away from Cape Hatteras and 36 miles from Fort Hatteras.

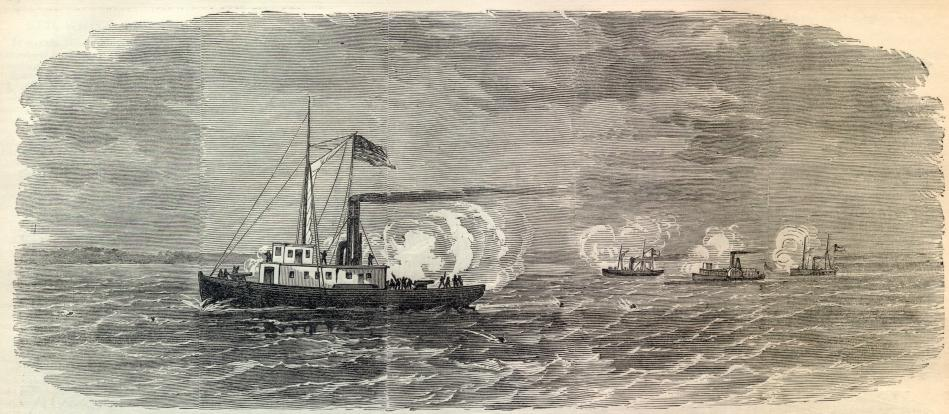
Capture of the USS Fanny on October 1, 1861

Colonel Wright had no intentions of attacking the federal garrison at Hatteras but was eager to intercept a Union vessel to ascertain what their intentions in the region were. With the support of Commodore William F. Lynch, the Confederate "Mosquito Fleet"—an assortment of small armed steamers guarding North Carolina's sounds—was detailed to the task. On October 1, the Union tug Fanny was dispatched to Chicamacomico to resupply the 12th Indiana Regiment. Brown delayed in unloading the vessel and it was attacked by three ships of the Mosquito Fleet, surrendering after a brief fight. The loss of the Fanny led U.S. General John E. Wool to expedite the transfer of Brigadier General Joseph K. Mansfield to Hatteras to assume overall command of federal forces there.

Aside from seizing valuable supplies, the Confederates obtained through their capture of the Fanny knowledge of the federal encampment at Chicamacomico. This generated rumors in the Confederate ranks that the federals were planning an offensive towards Roanoke Island. Notions of the size of the Union's Chicamacomico garrison were also exaggerated. As a result of these reports, Wright was convinced that he needed to mount a preemptive offensive. He devised a plan with Lynch whereby the Mosquito Fleet would land the Third Georgia to the north of the Union regiment and the Eighth North Carolina Regiment under Colonel Henry M. Shaw would land to the south, encircling and defeating it. Thereafter, some of the Confederate forces would detach to destroy the lighthouse at Cape Hatteras while the rest would mount an assault on Fort Hatteras and Fort Clark. Wright and Lynch took several days to unload the Fanny and prepare for their operation.

== The affair ==
=== October 5 ===
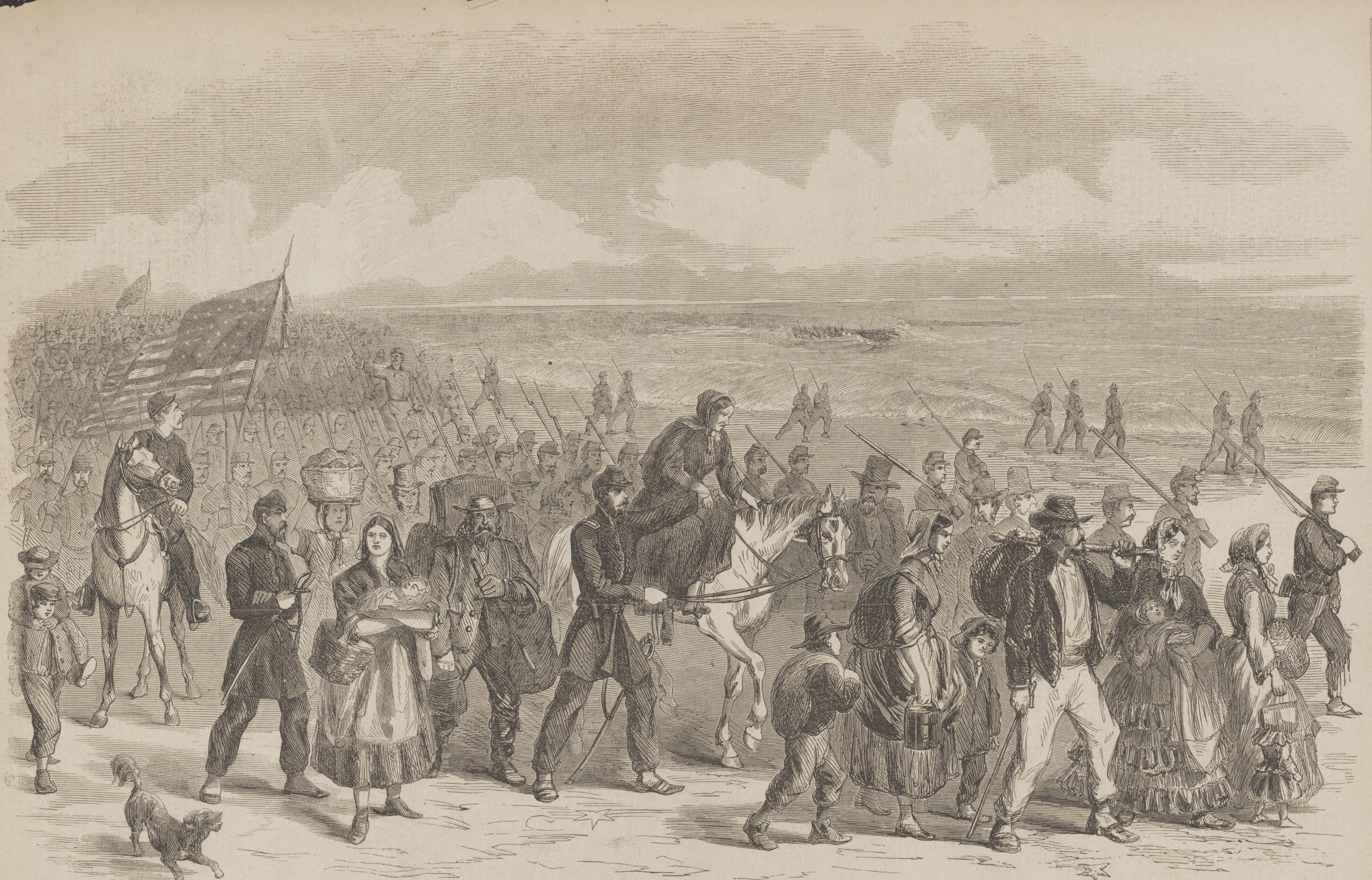
Retreat of the 12th Indiana Regiment and civilians from Chicamacomico on October 5, 1861

At about 1 a.m. on October 5, the Confederate expedition departed Roanoke Island. Passing through the Croatan Sound and the Pamlico Sound, it reached Chicamacomico just after daybreak. The 12th Indiana's lookouts observed the flotilla steaming towards their camp. Colonel Brown formed his regiment and dispatched a messenger to Hatteras to raise the alarm to Hawkins. Using his scope, Brown observed the Curlew, Raleigh, Junaluska, Empire, Cotton Plant, and Fanny, as well as several barges and small craft laden with troops. After firing signal shots, the steamers broke off from the rest of the flotilla, and Brown surmised that the Confederates were going to land troops north and south of his regiment and trap them in. The Confederate steamers opened fire upon the federal camp with their artillery, setting tents on fire and destroying a house. Having learned from locals that landings with light craft were possible below Chicamacomico and having orders to withdraw to the Hatteras lighthouse in such an event, Brown instructed the regiment to retreat. The Indianans took their arms and basic equipment but left the rest of their supplies behind. Most of the civilian populace of Chicamacomico fled ahead of the federals.

The 12th Indiana Regiment struggled in its march through the deep sand and heat. Wright and three of his companies disembarked from the Cotton Plant with two boat howitzers and opened fire upon their rear. The Confederate flotilla provided them with artillery support. Once the rest of the Third Georgia Regiment landed, the Confederates began their pursuit. Colonel Wright led with his horse until it was shot out from under him, but continued to engage the federal rear guard and took several prisoners. Meanwhile, Brown's courier reached Hawkins to inform him of the attack and reported that Brown intended to reach Hatteras lighthouse and prepare a defense. Hawkins promptly departed for the lighthouse with six companies of the 9th New York Volunteers and dispatched two ships, the USS Susquehanna and the USS Monticello, to assist.

In the late afternoon a group of Confederate ships attempted to land the Eighth North Carolina Regiment south of the federals but ran aground in the sound about two miles from the island. Troops exited the boats and attempted to wade to shore but ventured only a mile before encountering deeper waters and were forced to return to their vessels which then steamed back to Roanoke. Brown's men crossed over to the ocean side of the island and marched until they reached Hatteras lighthouse at about midnight. The 12th Indiana encamped there for the night. The pursuing Georgians, unaware of the failure of the Shaw's landing attempt, made camp south of Kinnakeet. The Susquehanna arrived offshore of the lighthouse during the night and anchored there to provide cover to the Indianans.

=== October 6 ===
On the morning of October 6, the Georgians learned that their counterparts had failed to land below the federals and moved to withdraw north. Shortly after they had begun their march, the 9th New York Volunteers reached Hatteras lighthouse and began to pursue. Captain James L. Lardner of the Susquehanna had his ship hold position to protect and resupply the Indianans but ordered the Monticello to proceed ahead and search for the Confederates. At about 1 p.m., just after the Third Georgia had passed through Kinnakeet, the Monticello, commanded by Lieutenant Daniel L. Braine, appeared offshore and began bombarding the Confederate column with cannon, grape shot, and cannister shot. The Confederates retreated along the sound side of the island to avoid the artillery. The Confederate Mosquito Fleet attempted to provide cover to the withdrawing troops but could not find deep enough water to sail within range.

While shelling the Confederate column, the crew of the Monticello observed two men on shore signaling them. They dispatched a boat to investigate. Both men were from the 12th Indiana, and while one drowned while attempting to swim to the boat, the other, Private Warren O'Haver, was recovered. He claimed they had been captured by the Confederates but were able to escape. After marching 13 miles, the federals gave up their pursuit. The affair was strategically inconclusive; the Confederates had returned to Roanoke Island, while the Union troops had given up on holding an advanced position and regrouped at Fort Hatteras.

== Aftermath ==
The events at Chicamacomico were initially reported in newspapers as the "Chicamacomico Affair" or the "Affair at Chicamacomico". Colonel Brown referred to the events as a "race" in a letter he wrote to a friend a month after the engagement. William Turner, the adjutant of the Third Georgia Regiment, coined the phrase "Chickamicomico [sic] races" in an account published in a Georgia newspaper in 1864. Colonel Claiborne Snead referred to the "properly styled [...] Chicamacomico Races" during his speech at an 1874 Third Georgia veterans' event. The derisive "Chicamacomico Races" name is often used to recall the event in modern times.

Reports of casualties from the affair vary. Historian John Thomas Scharf wrote that eight members of the 12th Indiana Regiment were killed and 41 captured by the Confederates. General Mansfield reported that 27 Indianans were lost. Hawkins did not state any losses in his report due to the roll books of the 12th Indiana Regiment being left behind in their retreat. As for Confederate casualties, Scharf reported that their only loss was of one soldier of the Governor Guards who had died of exhaustion during their retreat. Private O'Haver claimed to have killed one of his captors before fleeing to the Monticello. One officer of the Third Georgia Regiment wrote that two men in the detachment received minor wounds during the Monticello's bombardment. Historian William R. Trotter wrote that "a half dozen" Confederates were wounded by the cannonade.

Hawkins defended his decision to divide his command, arguing that it had halted Confederate advances and offered protection to local civilians who had pledged their loyalty to the United States. He attributed the "recent disaster" to the "criminal neglect of the Government in not heeding my suggestions". General Wool supported Hawkins' overall report of the incident but denounced his statement with regards to the government as "highly insubordinate". Mansfield soon thereafter assumed command of the Hatteras garrison from Hawkins though the latter remained in charge of his own regiment.

On October 13, General Thomas Williams relieved General Mansfield at Hatteras. Accompanying Williams was a new captain for the 9th New York. According to Hawkins, this man was "disreputable" and thus he refused to allow him to join his regiment. Williams had Hawkins detained for his insubordination and he remained in such condition until Wool dispatched him on a special mission to Washington D. C.. Under Williams' command, the Union garrison on Hatteras Island focused on fortification construction and training; aside from minor naval skirmishes, there was no combat in the area for the remainder of the year. Union forces eventually attacked and captured Roanoke Island in February 1862.

== Works cited ==
- Abbott, John Stevens Cabot (1875). The History of the Civil War in America. Vol. 1. Norwich, Connecticut: Henry Bill Publishing Company. OCLC 1046533511.
- Barrett, John G. (1963). The Civil War in North Carolina. Chapel Hill: The University of North Carolina Press. ISBN 978-0-8078-0874-0.
- Mallison, Fred M. (2024). The Civil War on the Outer Banks : A History of the Late Rebellion Along the Coast of North Carolina from Carteret to Currituck, with Comments on Prewar Conditions and an Account of Postwar Recovery. Jefferson: McFarland. ISBN 978-1-4766-2159-3.
- Oxford, Lee Thomas (2010). The Civil War on Hatteras : The Chicamacomico Affair and the Capture of the U.S. Gunboat Fanny. Charleston: Arcadia Publishing. ISBN 978-1-61423-928-4.
- Trotter, William R. (1989). Ironclads and Columbiads: the Civil War in North Carolina: The Coast. Winston-Salem: John F. Blair. ISBN 978-0-89587-088-9.
