= Battle of Sewell's Point =

Battle in the American Civil War

Coordinates: 36°57′17″N 76°19′36″W

- Part of the Union blockade
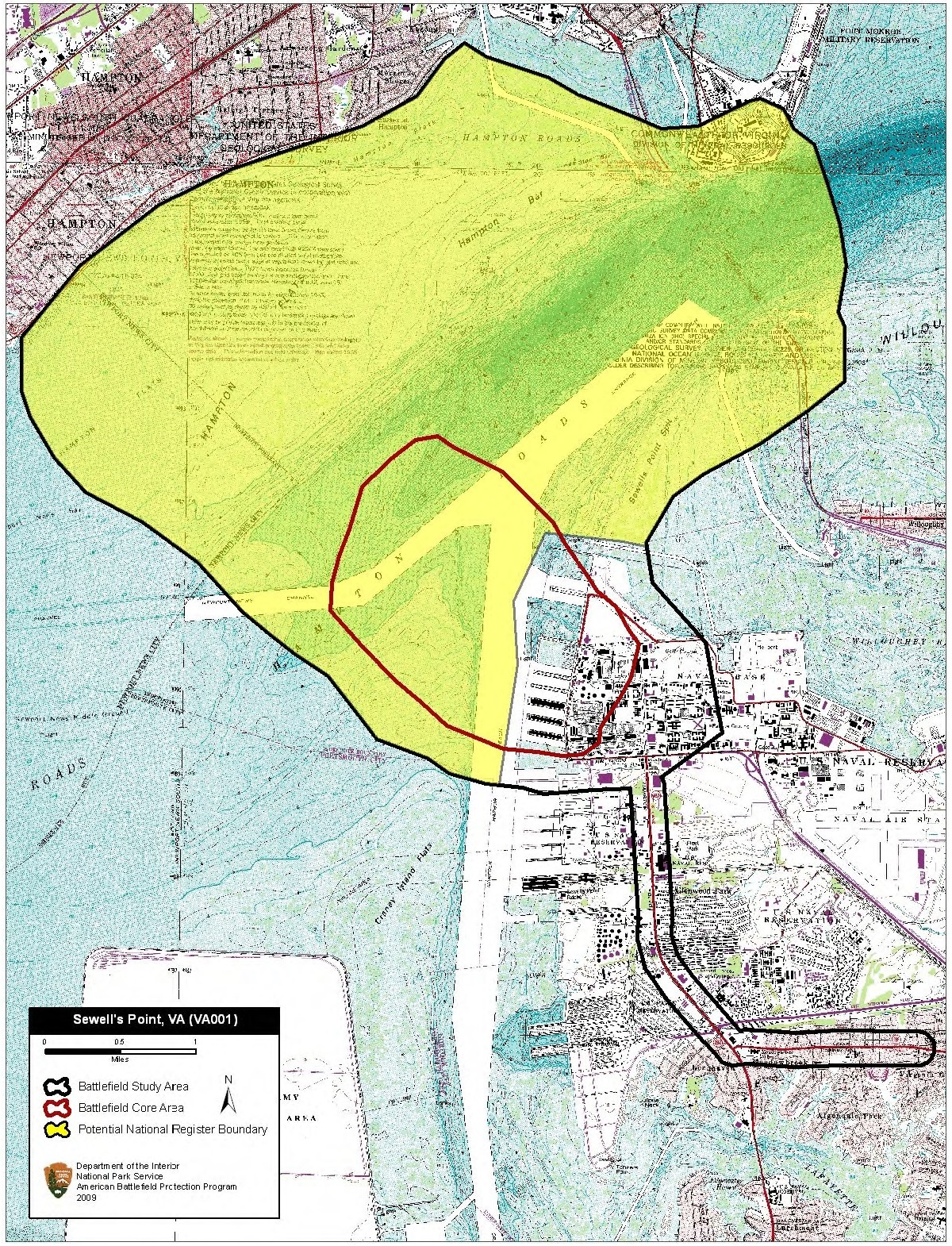
- Map of the Sewell's Point battlefield
Date	May 18, 1861 – May 19, 1861 (2 days)
Location	Norfolk, Virginia
Result	Inconclusive: USS Monticello and USS Thomas Freeborn withdrew

Belligerents
United States (Union)	(Confederate States of America) CSA (Confederacy)

Commanders and leaders
Henry Eagle; Daniel L. Braine	Walter Gwynn; Peyton H. Colquitt

Units involved
USS Monticello; USS Thomas Freeborn	Norfolk Light Artillery Blues; City Light Guard; Norfolk Juniors; Wood's Rifles

Strength
2 gunboats	1 shore battery (3 32-pounder guns)

Casualties and losses
- 10 (Note: Casualty figures are from the National Park Service web site. Other sources consulted for this article do not mention casualties for this action or state no Confederate casualties and at least six wounded Union sailors aboard the Monticello.)

The Battle of Sewell's Point was an inconclusive exchange of cannon fire between the Union gunboat USS Monticello, supported by the USS Thomas Freeborn, and Confederate batteries on Sewell's Point that took place on May 18, 19 and 21, 1861, in Norfolk County, Virginia in the early days of the American Civil War. Little damage was done to either side. By the end of April 1861, USS Cumberland and a small number of supporting ships were enforcing the Union blockade of the southeastern Virginia ports at the southern end of the Chesapeake Bay and had captured several ships which attempted to pass the blockade. USS Monticello's bombardment of the Sewell's Point battery was one of the earliest Union Navy actions against Confederate forces during the Civil War. (Note: This otherwise minor incident at Sewell's Point was called a battle at the time simply because it occurred soon after the fall of Fort Sumter and before any significant military actions had occurred in the war. The U. S. National Park Service includes this engagement in its list of 384 principal battles of the American Civil War.) While it has been suggested by some sources that the Monticello's action may have been the first gunfire by the Union Navy during the Civil War, a brief exchange of cannon fire between the U.S. gunboat USS Yankee and shore batteries manned by Virginia volunteer forces which had not yet been incorporated into the Confederate States Army at Gloucester Point, Virginia on the York River occurred on May 7, 1861. (Note: Although sources differ on the date of the Gloucester Point engagement, the reports of the commanders clearly state the date as May 7, 1861.)

== Background ==
Although providing for a vote on May 23, 1861, the Virginia state convention voted for and effectively accomplished the secession of that state from the Union on April 17, 1861, which was three days after the surrender of Fort Sumter to Confederate forces and two days after President Abraham Lincoln's call for volunteers to reclaim federal property and to suppress the rebellion. During the night of April 20, 1861, the Commander of the U. S. Gosport Navy Yard in Norfolk County, Virginia (now the Norfolk Naval Yard in the City of Portsmouth, Virginia) Charles S. McCauley, fearing he could not hold the yard against the rebels and although without instructions from authorities in Washington, D.C., ordered the evacuation and burning of the yard and any ships that could not be sailed away, including the USS Merrimack. This ended the presence of Union land forces in the Norfolk area of south Hampton Roads for over one year. On April 27, 1861, President Lincoln ordered the Union blockade of the Confederacy extended to the coasts of Virginia and North Carolina, which were already in the process of joining the Confederate States of America although they did not officially do so until May 1861.

Virginia Militia Major General and, effective May 1, 1861, Virginia Provisional Army (Note: Although this army was organized as a state establishment that was something more than a militia and which would become part of the Confederate Army, it was not the Provisional Army of the Confederacy and did not become part of it until after the May 23, 1861 Virginia secession vote. Gwynn never held a rank above colonel in the PACS.) Brigadier General Walter Gwynn, a former U.S. Army engineering officer and former railroad engineer and surveyor, sited and supervised the construction of batteries to defend Norfolk, Virginia in late April and early May 1861, including the battery at Sewell's Point. Gwynn commanded the defense of Norfolk until he was relieved by regular Confederate forces on May 23, 1861.

== Battle ==
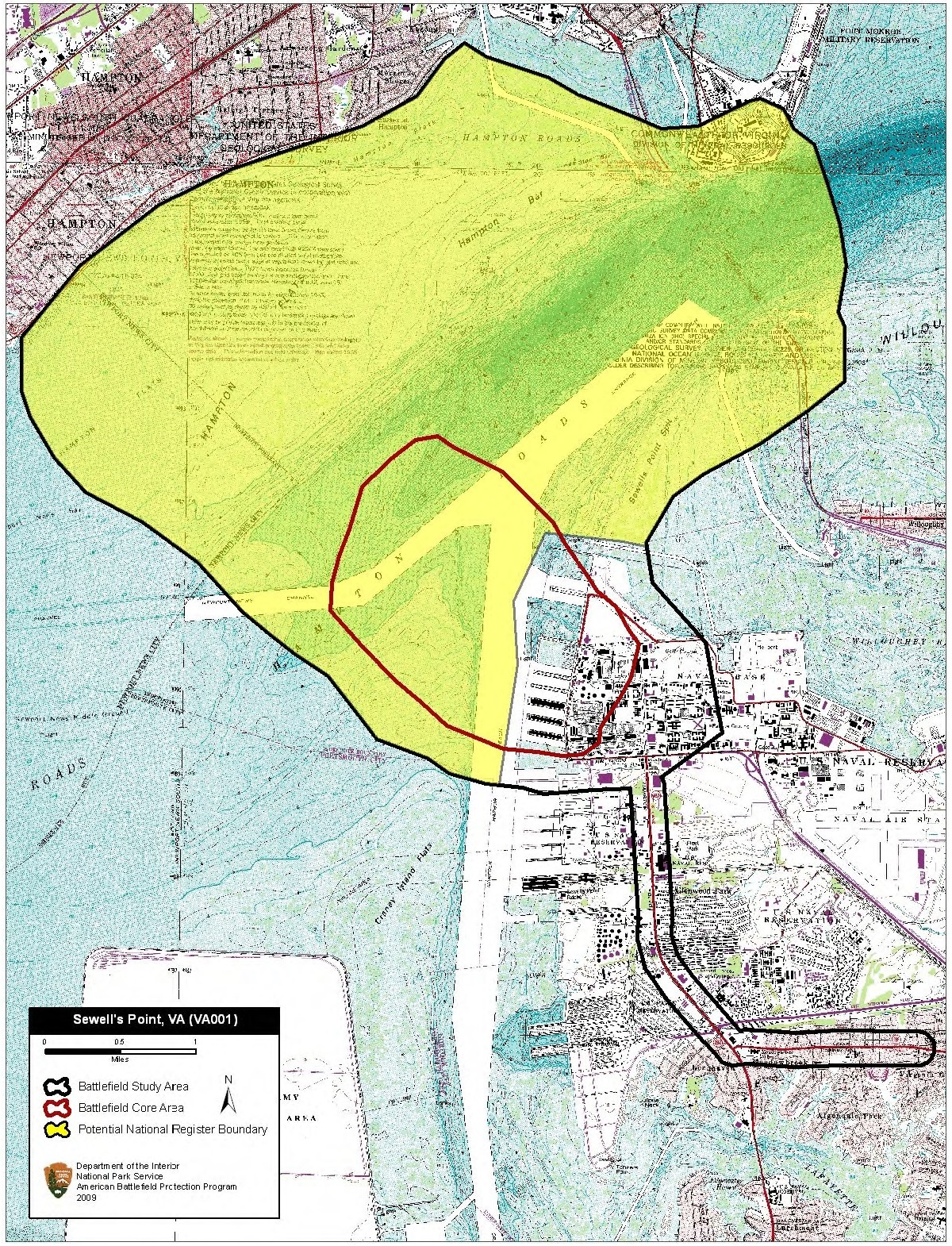
Map of Sewell's Point Battlefield core and study areas by the American Battlefield Protection Program.

As part of the Union blockade of Chesapeake Bay during the American Civil War, the Union gunboat USS Monticello, commanded by Captain Henry Eagle with Lieutenant (later Rear Admiral) Daniel L. Braine second in command, exchanged cannon fire with Confederate batteries on Sewell's Point, Virginia, in Norfolk County, Virginia (present day City of Norfolk, Virginia), in an attempt to enforce the blockade of the Hampton Roads area in southeastern Virginia. The two sides did each other little harm. On May 18, 1861, the Monticello fired on the unfinished Confederate battery at Sewell's Point, which commanded the entrance to the Elizabeth River and the harbor at Norfolk, Virginia but which had no guns yet in place, with little effect.

By 5:00 p.m. on May 19, 1861, the Confederates had installed three 32-pound guns at the Sewell's Point battery. When the Monticello began to fire on the works at about 5:30 p.m., the battery returned fire, which drove off the Monticello. Captain Peyton H. Colquitt of the Columbus Light Guard from Georgia (Note: Captain Colquitt should not be confused with Brigadier General Alfred Holt Colquitt, who also was from Georgia.) commanded the battery. Captain Colquitt raised a Georgia state flag at the battery since he did not have a Confederate flag.

On May 21, 1861, the Monticello fired two shots at the battery but again drew off when the battery returned fire.

== Aftermath ==
After the battle, the USS Thomas Freeborn joined the Federal Potomac Flotilla. Under the command of Commander James H. Ward, the Thomas Freeborn attacked the Confederate batteries at the confluence of the Potomac River and Aquia Creek in the Battle of Aquia Creek on May 29 and 30 and June 1, 1861, to little effect.

The Sewell's Point battery and other batteries in the area engaged Union vessels on other occasions over the next 12 months, including engagements of Union vessels or supporting fire against them during the clash of the ironclads (the Union's USS Monitor and the Confederacy's CSS Virginia, formerly USS Merrimack) during the Battle of Hampton Roads on March 9, 1862. Union Navy gunboats, including the Monitor, shelled the Sewell's Point batteries and other targets in the area again on May 8, 1862. Because of the threat of invasion by the large Union Army force at Fort Monroe across Hampton Roads from the threatened cities of Norfolk, Virginia and Portsmouth, Virginia and the County of Norfolk, Virginia, although many of the Union soldiers were then engaged in the Peninsula Campaign, the Confederates evacuated the Norfolk area on May 9, 1862 and the early morning of May 10, 1862. Federal troops occupied Norfolk and Portsmouth on May 10, 1862. When they arrived at Norfolk and Portsmouth, the Federal troops found that the Confederates had abandoned the batteries at Sewell's Point and other fortified positions in the vicinity.

No sign of the Sewell's Point battery exists today. The location is within the U.S. Navy's Norfolk Naval Base.
