= James Kehoe =

James Kehoe may refer to:

- James N. Kehoe (1862–1945), American politician from Kentucky
- James W. Kehoe (1925–1998), American judge
- Jim Kehoe (1918–2010), American athletic director
- James J. Kehoe, American politician from New York
