= Michael J. Coffey =

American politician

Michael J.Coffey
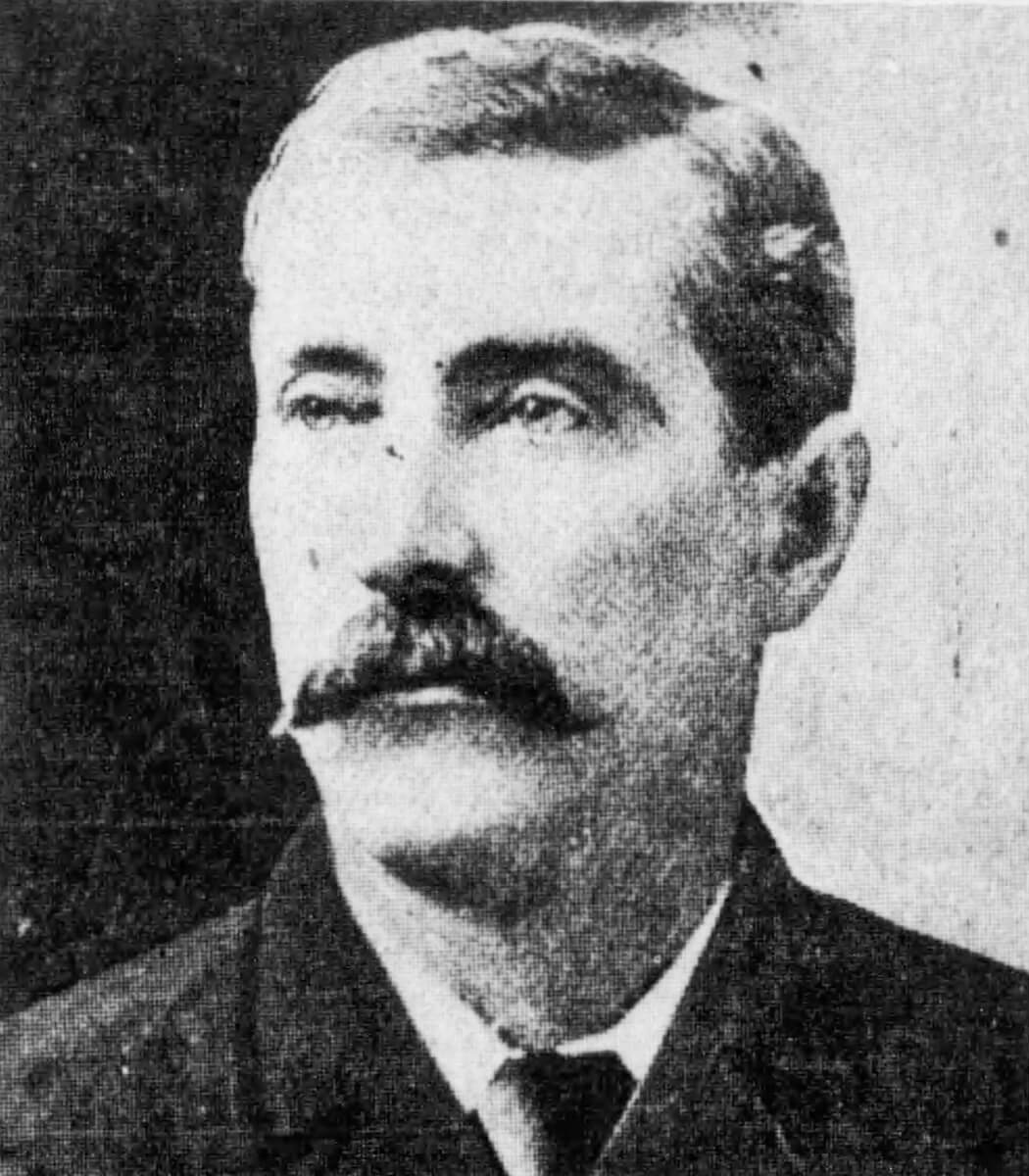

Member of the New York Senate
- In office January 1, 1894 – January 1, 1901
- Preceded by: John McCarty
- Succeeded by: James H. McCabe
- Constituency: 2nd District (1894–1896); 5th District (1896–1901)

Member of the New York General Assembly
- In office January 1, 1874 – January 1, 1876
- Preceded by: Dominick Roche
- Succeeded by: John Stanley
- Constituency: 3rd District (1874–1876)
- In office January 1, 1884 – January 1, 1885
- Preceded by: Thomas J. Sheridan
- Succeeded by: James A. McMahon
- Constituency: 5th District (1884–1885)

Personal details
- Born: 1838 County Cork, Ireland
- Died: March 23, 1907 (aged 68–69) Brooklyn New York
- Cause of death: Cancer
- Party: Democratic
- Spouse: Mary Coffey
- Children: Joseph Coffey; Florence Coffey; James Coffey; Marie Coffey
- Parent(s): James Coffey; Eliza Coffey

Military service
- Allegiance: United States
- Branch/service: United States Navy
- Years of service: 1861–1864
- Battles/wars: American Civil War

Michael J. Coffey (c. 1840 – March 23, 1907) was an American politician from New York who served in the American Civil War and was an influential Democrat in New York City in the latter half of the 19th century.

== Early life ==
His family immigrated to the United States from Ireland when Michael was five, and they settled in Brooklyn. When he was older he worked as a ship carpenter and worked with Ned Harrigan, who would become an actor.

== Civil War ==
When the American Civil War broke out Michael joined the navy on the Monticello gunboat. Daniel Braine, who was in command, said that "He was one of the most courageous man he had ever met." He served on the boat until the end of the war.

== Political career ==
Coffey became involved in Brooklyn politics. He lived in Red Hook. In 1867 Coffey was elected to The Brooklyn Board of Alderman. He served on the board until 1874 to serve in the New York State Assembly. In the Assembly, he served for the third and fifth districts. He was chosen again to serve on the Board of Alderman where he served as president of the board for two years. In 1893 he was elected to the New York State Senate the same year that all other Democrats in Kings County were defeated. In 1901 he was accused of "treason" by the establishment and he was expelled he argued a case to the Court of Appeals and was reinstated. During his time in politics, he was rivals with Hugh McLaughlin who was the boss of the Democratic Party in Kings County. Michael's district was dubbed the name "Coffeyville". He is responsible for the creation of Red Hook's only park. The largest plot of the park was purchased in 1892 other parcels were purchased in 1907 and 1943. The park gained the name "Coffey Park".

== Later life ==
After leaving the State Senate, he returned to work as a carpenter. He developed cancer and died on March 23, 1907, in Long Island College Hospital.

== Sources ==
- The New York Red Book compiled by Edgar L. Murlin (published by James B. Lyon, Albany NY, 1897; p. 404, 495ff and 503f)
- Life Sketches of Government Officers and Members of the Legislature of the State of New York in 1875 by W. H. McElroy and Alexander McBride (p. 163) [gives birth year 1843]
- Sketches of the members of the Legislature in The Evening Journal Almanac (1895; p. 48) [gives birth year 1842]
- Ex-Senator Coffey Dead in Brooklyn in The New York Times on March 23, 1907 [states "was born 68 years ago", placing his birth in 1838 or 1839]

New York State Assembly
Preceded by Dominick Roche	New York State Assembly; Kings County, 3rd District; 1874–1875	Succeeded by John Stanley
Preceded by Thomas J. Sheridan	New York State Assembly; Kings County, 5th District; 1884	Succeeded by James A. McMahon
New York State Senate
Preceded by John McCarty	New York State Senate; 2nd District; 1894–1895	Succeeded by Theodore Koehler
Preceded by Daniel Bradley	New York State Senate; 5th District; 1896–1900	Succeeded by James H. McCabe
