= Senator Koehler =

Senator Koehler may refer to:

- Dave Koehler (born 1948), Illinois State Senate
- Kyle Koehler (born 1961), Ohio State Senate
- Theodore Koehler (1856–1929), New York State Senate

== See also ==
- Carrie Koelker (born 1970), Iowa State Senate
