= CSS Raleigh (1861) =

Confederate States Navy steamboat (1861–1865)

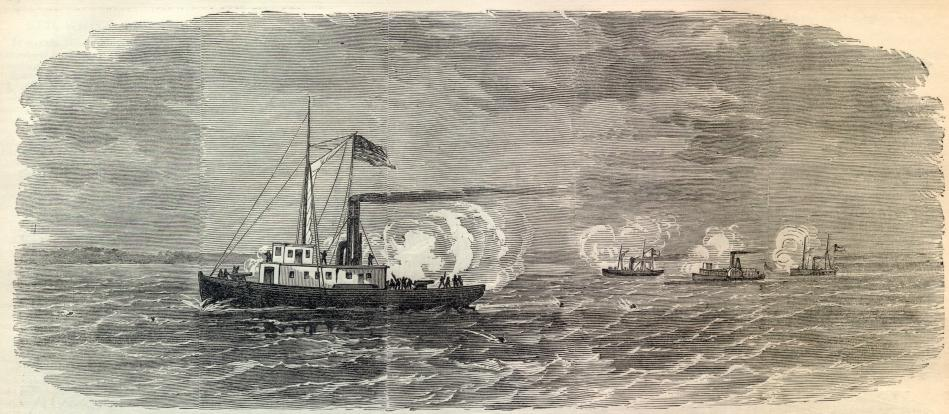
- CSS Raleigh, Curlew and Junaluska attacks Fanny.

History

Confederate States
- Name: Raleigh
- Namesake: Raleigh, North Carolina
- Acquired: May 1861
- Commissioned: May 1861
- Fate: Destroyed to prevent capture 4 April 1865

General characteristics
- Displacement: 65 tons
- Propulsion: Steam engine
- Armament: 1 to 4 guns

CSS Raleigh was originally a small, iron-hulled, propeller-driven towing steamer operating on the Albemarle and Chesapeake Canal. She was taken over by the State of North Carolina in May 1861, and transferred to the Confederate States the following July. Her commanding officer during 1861–1862 was Lieutenant Joseph W. Alexander. Her entire service was in coastal waters of North Carolina and Virginia and in the James River as part of the James River Squadron.

Raleigh supported Fort Hatteras and Fort Clark on August 28–29, 1861; took part in an expedition on October 1 to capture United States Army steamer Fanny with valuable stores on board; and accompanied CSS Sea Bird when she reconnoitered Pamlico Sound on January 20, 1862. She was also active in defense of Roanoke Island against an amphibious assault by overwhelming Federal forces on February 7–8, 1862, and at Elizabeth City, North Carolina 2 days later. Thence Raleigh escaped through Dismal Swamp Canal to Norfolk, Virginia.

On March 8–9, 1862, Raleigh was tender to CSS Virginia during the historic Battle of Hampton Roads, for which she received the thanks of the Confederate Congress.

With the Federal recapture of Norfolk Navy Yard in May 1862, Raleigh steamed up the James River, but thereafter a shortage of crew members restricted her to flag-of-truce or patrol service.

Raleigh, renamed Roanoke near the end of the war, was destroyed by the Confederates on April 4, 1865, upon the evacuation of Richmond, Virginia.

== Commanders ==
The commanders of the CSS Raleigh were:

- Lieutenant Joseph W. Alexander (1861–1862)
- Lieutenant Maxwell T. Clarke (1863-June 1864)
- Lieutenant Mortimer Murray Benton (during June 1864)
- Master's Mate A.E. Albertson (July 31, 1864-)
- Acting Master W. Frank Shippey (October–December 1864)
- Lieutenant William Wonder Pollock (January 1865-end of war)
