= Junaluska =

Cherokee leader

- Tsunu’lahun’ski
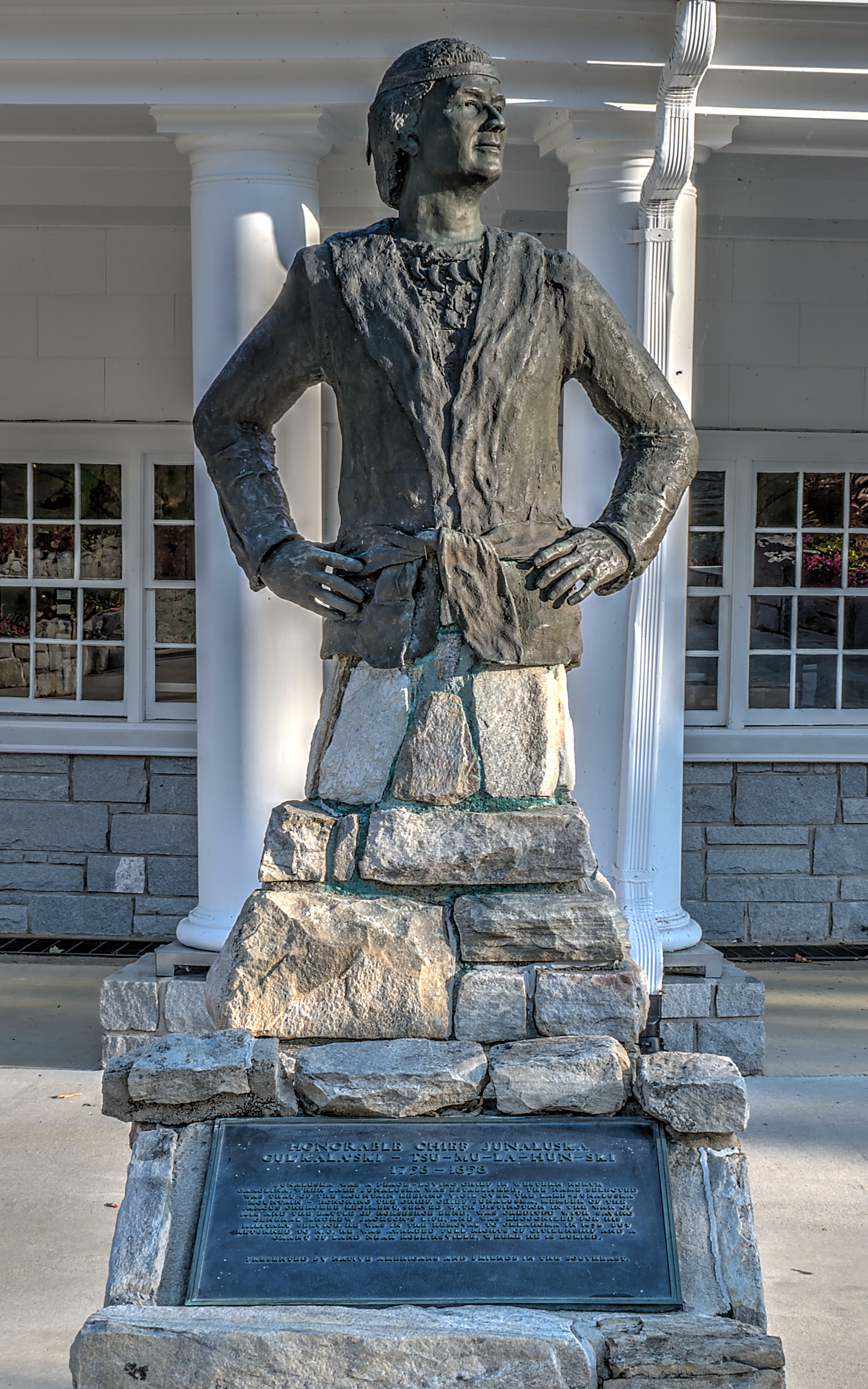
- Memorial sculpture at Lake Junaluska
- Born: c. 1775; Tryon County, North Carolina, British America
- Died: November 20, 1858 (en route to) Citico, Tennessee, U.S.
- Resting place: Robbinsville, North Carolina, U.S.
- Other names: Tsunulahunski, Detsinulahungu
- Known for: Battle of Horseshoe Bend (1814) during the War of 1812

Junaluska (Cherokee: Tsunu’lahun’ski) (c.1775 – November 20, 1858), was a leader of the Cherokee who resided in towns in western North Carolina in the early 19th century. He fought alongside Andrew Jackson at the Battle of Horseshoe Bend during the War of 1812/Creek War. In the course of the battle he saved Jackson's life, an act he reportedly regretted later in life.

Although he was removed with most Cherokee on the Trail of Tears, Junaluska returned to North Carolina in the late 1840s. The state legislature granted him citizenship and some land near present-day Robbinsville. He was among the Cherokee who lived in North Carolina from the 19th century, and were ancestors to the federally recognized tribe of Eastern Band of Cherokee Indians. This group organized in the 20th century.

== Name and noms de guerre ==
Junaluska was born around 1775, approximately 15 miles (24 km) south of Franklin, North Carolina, near present-day Dillard, Georgia. A few days after his birth, the cradle-board holding him fell over. He was called Gu-Ka-Las-Ki or Gulkalaski in the Cherokee language, meaning "one who falls from a leaning position".

Later as an adult, after an unsuccessful military venture, he was named Tsu-Na-La-Hun-Ski or Tsunulahunski ("one who tries but fails"). Junaluska described this warfare events by the term, Detsinulahungu (meaning "I tried, but could not").

== Allies and enemies ==
Oral tradition has it that Junaluska met with Tecumseh in Soco Gap in 1811. This has not been verified. Junaluska is known to have informed Tecumseh that the Cherokee in his region would not join an Indian confederacy against the European-American settlers.

"As long as the sun shines and the grass grows, there shall be friendship between us, and the feet of the Cherokee shall be toward the east." —Andrew Jackson to Junaluska

In 1813, when the Cherokee raised up 636 men against the Red Stick faction of the Creek Indians in Alabama, Junaluska personally recruited over a hundred men to fight at the Battle of Horseshoe Bend. The Cherokee unit was incorporated into the combined Creek-Cherokee-Yuchi-Choctaw army under the command of Brig. General William McIntosh, a "friendly" Creek from Georgia. Junaluska's actions turned the tide when he swam the Tallapoosa River, retrieving Redstick canoes in order to ferry the Cherokee to the rear of the Creek. He is also credited with saving Andrew Jackson's life during this battle.

According to the provisions of an 1819 treaty with the United States, Junaluska applied for 640 acres (2.6 km^{2}) of land at Sugar Creek near Franklin, North Carolina. When his land was usurped by white settlers, he moved to the remaining portion of the Cherokee Nation.

== Contention with Jackson ==
Jackson reportedly met with Junaluska regarding the Indian Removal Act, but the president said, "Sir, your audience is ended. There is nothing I can do for you."

During the infamous Trail of Tears in 1838, Junaluska and many other Cherokee people were incarcerated and held in nearby stockades prior to the march. Fort Montgomery was located near present day Robbinsville, North Carolina. From this stockade, Junaluska and thousands of other Cherokee were forced to walk overland to the Indian Territory, in present-day eastern Oklahoma. Junaluska was assigned to a detachment led by Jesse Bushyhead.

"If I had known that Jackson would drive us from our homes, I would have killed him that day at the Horseshoe".

About seven weeks into the journey, Junaluska and approximately 50 other Cherokee escaped. He and his band were soon captured and returned to the journey. After several years, Junaluska returned to North Carolina on foot. In 1847, after a plea by Col. William Holland Thomas, a white man who had been adopted into the Cherokee tribe, the state legislature rewarded Junalaska for his service. It granted him state citizenship and land near present-day Robbinsville, North Carolina.

== Personal life ==
Junaluska married Ni-suh and had three children, boys Jim-my and Sic-que-yuh, and daughter Na-lih.

Junaluska died November 20, 1858, and was buried in Robbinsville. His grave was originally marked, in traditional Cherokee style, with a pile of stones. In 1910 the General Joseph Winston Chapter of the Daughters of the American Revolution (Winston-Salem) erected a monument at his grave site.

== Legacy ==
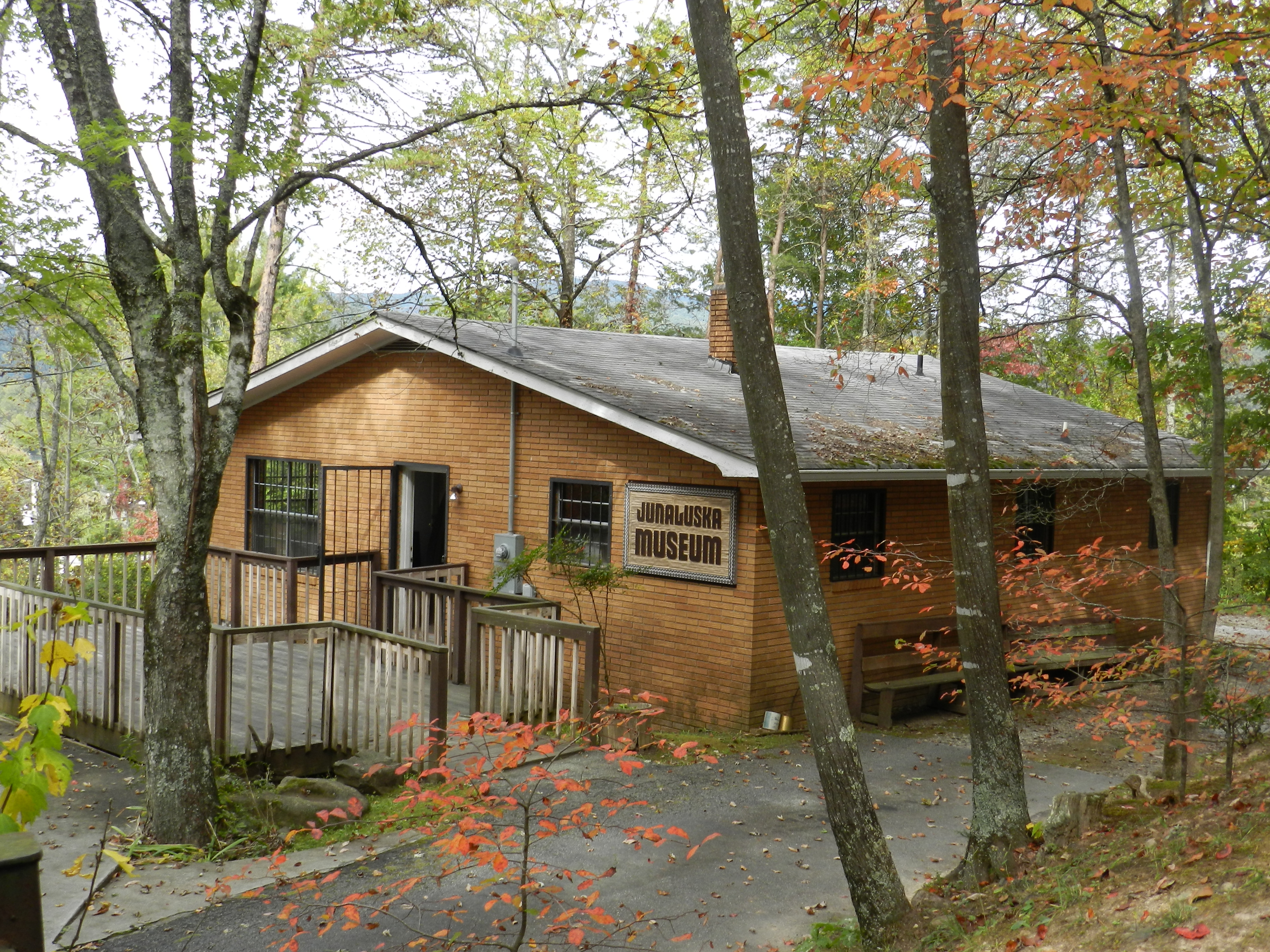
Junaluska Museum, located in Robbinsville, North Carolina

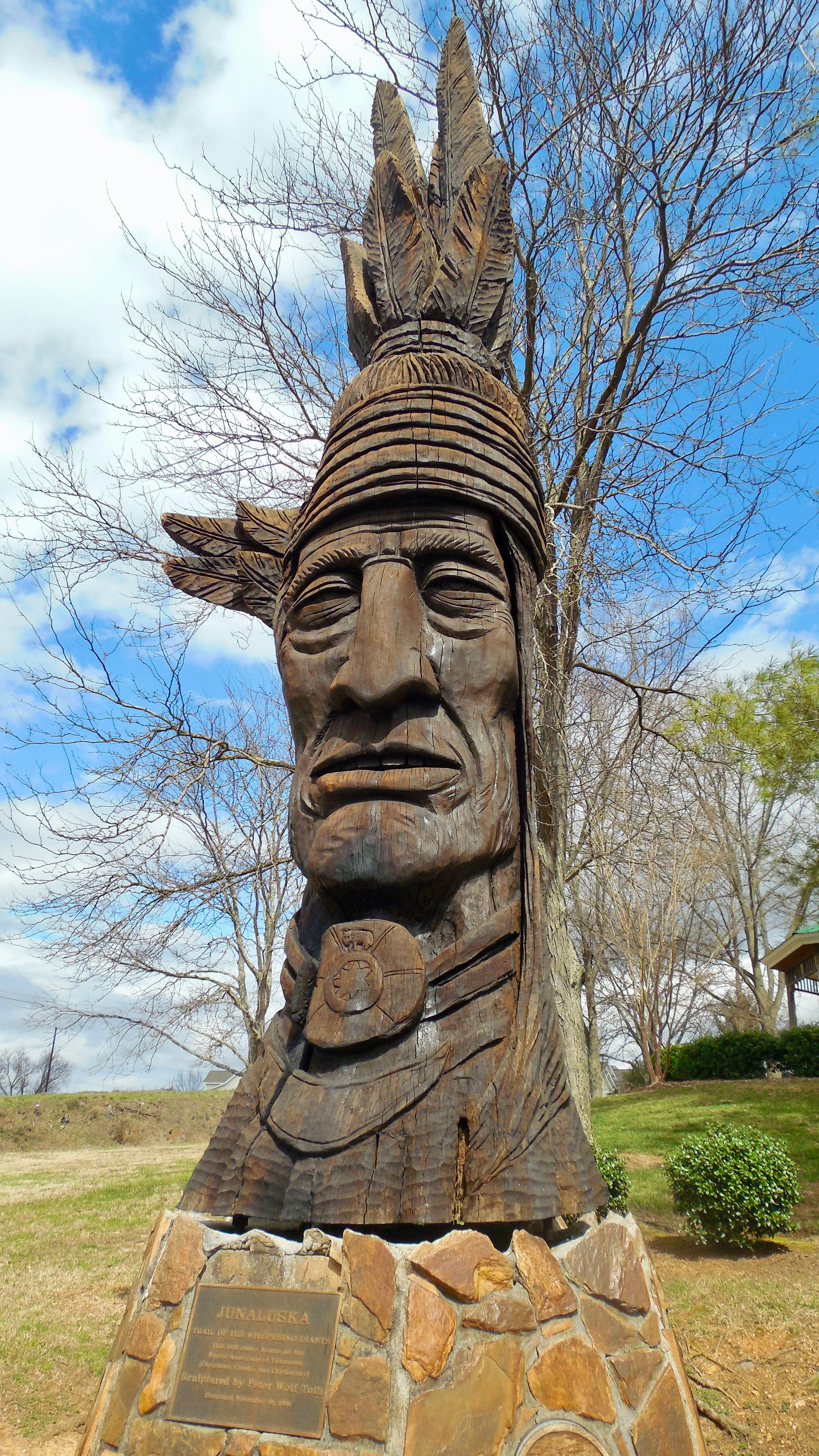
A 25 ft (7.6 m)–high wooden sculpture honoring Junaluska by Peter Wolf Toth is located in Johnson City, Tennessee.

During the American Civil War, the Confederate States Navy named one of its ships the CSS Junaluska for him.

Numerous places and physical features have been named for this leader: Lake Junaluska, Junaluska Creek, Junaluska Gap, Junaluska Ridge, the Junaluska Salamander, and Mount Junaluska (now known as North Eaglenest Mountain).

A giant sculpture was installed honoring him, along the Trail of the Whispering Giants in Metro-Kiwanis Park in Johnson City, Tennessee.

A museum and memorial in his honor were erected in Robbinsville in the late 20th century.
