= John McCarty (born 1844) =

American politician from New York

John McCarty (July 13, 1844, in Westchester County, New York – October 20, 1905, in Goshen, Orange County, New York) was an American politician from New York.

== Life ==
McCarty was born on July 13, 1844, in Westchester County, New York. He was the son of Hugh McCarty and Sarah Rogers, Irish immigrants from County Down. Hugh was a contractor for masonry who owned his own quarries and provided stone for the High Bridge and the Brooklyn Naval Yard dry dock. In about 1863 McCarty joined his father in Brooklyn, where Hugh initially planned on setting up his son to work as a grocery store owner.

Instead, McCarty worked in the Naval Yard and became politically active in the Brooklyn 5th Ward. He served for several years as the Brooklyn Board of Health's chief clerk, followed a position as Justice Walsh's clerk. In 1878, he was elected to the Brooklyn Board of Alderman, where he served until 1891 and at different points was made president of the board. For many years he was one of the "Big Four" who controlled the Brooklyn Democratic Party, the other three being Hugh McLaughlin, James Shevlin, and Patrick H. McCarren.

In 1891 he was elected to the New York State Senate, where he represented the 2nd District in 1892 and 1893. He was elected to the newly drawn 6th District in the 1893 election, but accusations of voter fraud in Gravesend and Staten Island led Republican Henry Wolfert to be seated in the State Senate instead.

After he left the State Senate, he moved to Goshen, where he lived for the rest of his life. He had racing horse stables there, and among his horses was Joe Patchen.

He married Margaret O'Neil in the Church of the Assumption near the end of the Civil War. They had no surviving children. In 1904, it was revealed that he had a second wife, Mary Eloise Lynch, who was living in Pittsfield. Mary was Margaret's niece and the mother of McCarty's three sons: John Jr., William, and Arthur.

McCarty died on October 20, 1905, of pneumonia in his home in Goshen. He was buried in Holy Cross Cemetery.

New York State Senate
Preceded by John C. Jacobs	New York State Senate; 2nd District; 1892–1893	Succeeded by Michael J. Coffey
