= Henry Eagle =

American commodore

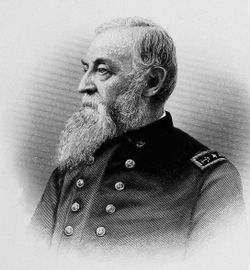
- Born: April 7, 1801; New York City, United States
- Died: November 26, 1882 (aged 81); New York City, United States
- Burial place: Woodlawn Cemetery, The Bronx, New York City
- Spouse: Minerva Smith (m. 1833–1882)
- Military career
- Allegiance: United States
- Branch: United States Navy
- Service years: 1818 – 1866
- Rank: Commodore
- Commands: USS Santee; USS Monticello
- Conflicts: Mexican-American War; American Civil War: Blockade of the Chesapeake Bay; Battle of Sewell's Point; Battle of Galveston Harbor; Peninsula Campaign; Battle of Hampton Roads

Henry Eagle (1801–1882) was an American commodore who served in the American Civil War. His most notable action during the conflict was his service at the Battle of Sewell's Point. He was also a midshipsman as well as commanding several ships during his military career.

== Biography ==
=== Early career ===
Henry was born on April 7, 1801, in New York City to his father, an immigrant from Dublin, who served in the Irish Brigade during the War of 1812. Eagle entered service on January 1, 1818, as a midshipman and was commissioned to the West Indies in 1827. He later served in Brazil and the Pacific Coast and due to his services, he was promoted to Commander in 1844. In 1833, he married Minerva Smith and had several children. He then superintended the Stevens iron battery at Hoboken, New Jersey as well as acting inspector in New York in 1846.

=== Mexican–American War ===
Eagle commanded the bomb vessel 2Etna and a division of the Pacific Squadron during the Mexican–American War and was then made a civil, military and trade governor of Tabasco. Later in September 1855, he would become a commissioned captain.

=== American Civil War ===
When the American Civil War broke out, Eagle was the bearer of communications between Manhattan and Brooklyn as well as volunteering to command the USS Monticello and took it into Norfolk, Virginia to blockade the Chesapeake Bay at the Battle of Sewell's Point. While the battle itself remained inconclusive, Eagle managed to silence the guns at the battle. He later commanded the USS Santee and captured and destroyed the privateer Royal Yacht at the Battle of Galveston Harbor. This resulted in Eagle being promoted to Commodore in 1862 and on January 1, 1863, he was placed on the retired list as well as being a prize commissioner in 1864 and 1865.

=== Later years ===
Later in 1865, he was a lighthouse inspector which he held that post until 1866. He later became a member of several veterans associations before dying on November 26, 1882.

Before Eagle's death, Hugh McCulloch personally requested to Richard W. Thompson that Eagle be posthumously promoted to admiral so that Eagle could "die peacefully and contentedly" but this request was denied.

=== Legacy ===
Eagle Avenue at 158th Street, Manhattan could possibly be named after Henry although the origins of the name are still in dispute.
