= CSS Junaluska =

Screw steamer tugboat

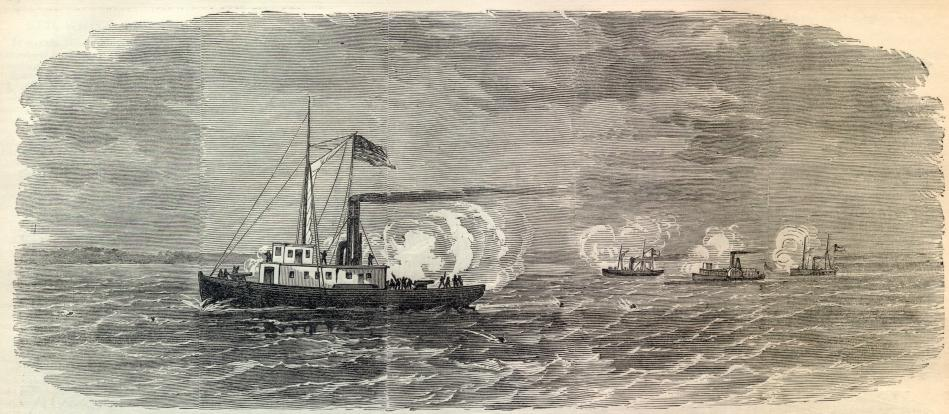
- USS Fanny (foreground) being chased by CSS Raleigh, Junaluska, and CSS Curlew (background)

History

Confederate States of America
- Name: CSS Junaluska
- Namesake: Junaluska
- Launched: 1860
- Commissioned: 1861
- Out of service: August 1862
- Fate: Sold and broken up

General characteristics
- Type: Screw steamer, tugboat
- Tonnage: 79 tons
- Propulsion: Steam engine
- Armament: 2 cannon

CSS Junaluska, also known as Younalaska, was a screw steamer tugboat that saw service with the Confederate States Navy during the American Civil War. Built in Philadelphia, Pennsylvania, in 1860, she was purchased by the Confederates at Norfolk, Virginia, in 1861. Serving off of the coasts of Virginia and North Carolina, she participated in the capture of the gunboat USS Fanny on October 1, 1861, and later in a raid on a Union campsite. She continued to serve along the North Carolina coast until August 1862, when she was sold and broken up.

== Service history ==
Junaluska was built in Philadelphia, Pennsylvania in 1860. The Dictionary of American Naval Fighting Ships states that Younalaska was an alternate name of the vessel, while naval historian Paul Silverstone states that it was her original name. Her namesake was Junaluska, a Cherokee who allegedly saved the life of Andrew Jackson. A screw steamer, she was built as a canal tugboat and had a tonnage of 79 tons. She had an iron hull. The Confederate States Navy purchased her in 1861 for service in the American Civil War while Junaluska was at Norfolk, Virginia. She then served along the coasts of Virginia and North Carolina. Her crew was composed of infantrymen who had little training for naval warfare.

On August 30, 1861, Junaluska ferried part of the 3rd Georgia Infantry Regiment to Roanoke Island, and on September 1 made a trip to Fort Hatteras and Fort Oregon on the Outer Banks. She was unarmed until September 30, when she was armed with a single 6-pounder cannon, a piece so light that historian William R. Trotter referred to it metaphorically as a popgun. As part of the North Carolina Squadron commanded by Flag Officer William F. Lynch, along with the gunboats CSS Raleigh and CSS Curlew, Junaluska participated in a naval expedition against the gunboat USS Fanny the next day. At this time, Junaluska was commanded by Midshipman William H. Vernon. Fanny arrived off of Chicamacomico, North Carolina, early in the afternoon. While some of the Union ship's crew were off the vessel on a launch, the three Confederate vessels approached Fanny at about 4:00 pm. Junaluska was the trailing vessel and was unable to get within range of the Union Navy ship. Fanny's path of retreat was cut off, and she surrendered after a fight of about 35 minutes.

Junaluska ferried the 3rd Georgia from Roanoke Island for a raid on the Union Chicamacomico camp during the night and morning of October 3/4, and bore the body of a Confederate soldier who had died of exhaustion during the raid back to the mainland. During this raid, Junaluska was commanded by a Captain Slacum. While the ship was transferred away from the North Carolina Squadron, Junaluska continued to serve off the North Carolina coast, although an official Confederate naval report dated May 2, 1862, placed her in the Richmond, Virginia, area. Both Silverstone and the Naval History and Heritage Command state that she was eventually armed with two cannons. In August 1862, she was sold and broken up.

== Sources ==
- Garrison, Webb B.; Garrison, Cheryl D. (2001). The Encyclopedia of Civil War Usage: An Illustrated Compendium of the Everyday Language of Soldiers and Civilians. Nashville, Tennessee: Cumberland House. ISBN 9781581821864.
- Official Records of the Union and Confederate Navies in the War of the Rebellion, Series 1. Vol. 7. Washington, D.C.: Government Printing Office. 1898.
- Oxford, Lee Thomas (2013). The Civil War on Hatteras: The Chicamacomico Affair and the Capture of the U.S. Gunboat Fanny. Charleston, South Carolina: History Press. ISBN 978-1-61423-928-4.
- Quarstein, John V. (2006). A History of Ironclads: The Power of Iron Over Wood. Charleston, South Carolina: The History Press. ISBN 978-1-59629-118-8.
- Silverstone, Paul H. (1989). Warships of the Civil War Navies. Annapolis, Maryland: Naval Institute Press. ISBN 0-87021-783-6.
- Trotter, William R. (1989). Ironclads and Columbiads: The Civil War in North Carolina: The Coast. Winston-Salem, North Carolina: John F. Blair. ISBN 0-89587-088-6.
