= USS Braine =

Fletcher-class destroyer

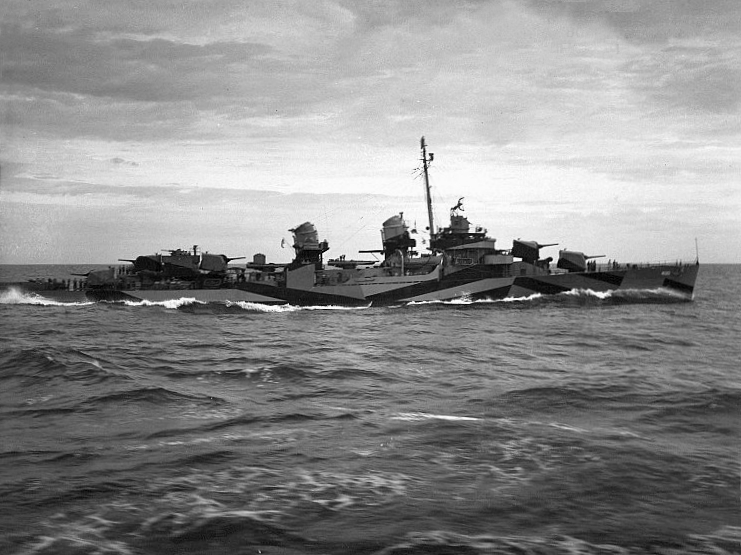
- USS Braine (DD-630), South Pacific, 1944.

History

United States
- Name: Braine
- Namesake: Rear Admiral Daniel L. Braine (1829-1898)
- Builder: Bath Iron Works
- Laid down: 12 October 1942
- Launched: 7 March 1943
- Commissioned: 11 May 1943
- Decommissioned: 17 August 1971
- Stricken: 17 August 1971
- Identification: Hull number: DD-630
- Motto: Combat Ready
- Fate: Transferred to Argentina, 17 August 1971

Argentina
- Name: Almirante Domecq Garcia
- Namesake: Admiral Manuel Domecq Garcia
- Commissioned: 17 August 1971
- Decommissioned: 30 November 1982
- Stricken: 30 November 1982
- Identification: Pennant number: D23
- Fate: Sunk as a target, 7 October 1983

General characteristics
- Class & type: Fletcher-class destroyer
- Displacement: 2,050 tons
- Length: 376 ft 6 in (114.76 m)
- Beam: 39 ft 8 in (12.09 m)
- Draft: 17 ft 9 in (5.41 m)
- Propulsion: 60,000 shp (45,000 kW); 2 propellers
- Speed: 35 knots (65 km/h; 40 mph)
- Range: 6,500 nmi (12,000 km; 7,500 mi) at 15 knots (28 km/h; 17 mph)
- Complement: 329
- Armament: 5 × 5 in (130 mm)/38 guns, 4 × 40 mm AA guns, 4 × 20 mm AA guns, 10 × 21 inch (533 mm). torpedo tubes, 6 × depth charge projectors, 2 × depth charge tracks

USS Braine (DD-630), a Fletcher-class destroyer, was a ship of the United States Navy named for Rear Admiral Daniel L. Braine (1829–1898), who served in the American Civil War. Constructed by Bath Iron Works in Bath, Maine, the ship was launched on 7 March 1943 and commissioned on 11 May 1943. The destroyer took part in the United States' naval campaign in the South Pacific during World War II. Following the war, the vessel was decommissioned and placed in reserve. During the Korean War, Braine was recommissioned and operated in the Mediterranean Sea before being decommissioned for the final time by the United States Navy in 1971. The destroyer was sold to Argentina and renamed ARA Almirante Domecq Garcia after Admiral Manuel Domecq Garcia and served with the Argentinian Navy until disposed of as a target ship in 1983.

== Construction and career ==
Braine was launched 7 March 1943 by Bath Iron Works Corp., Bath, Maine; sponsored by Mrs. Daniel L. Braine, wife of a grandson of Rear Admiral Braine, a veteran of the Mexican-American War and the American Civil War, and commissioned 11 May 1943.

Departing the United States east coast in the summer of 1943, Braine sailed via San Francisco to Pearl Harbor as an escort for troop transports. She then proceeded directly to Wake Island where she participated in its bombing and bombardment (5–6 October 1943). Between 1 and 3 November, Braine took part in the initial landings in Empress Augusta Bay, Bougainville. During the following two months, she escorted resupply echelons to the Bougainville beachhead.

=== 1944 ===
==== New Guinea ====
On 15 February 1944, Braine participated in the Green Island landing. She steamed into Rabaul Harbor under enemy fire for night shore bombardment of enemy installations (24–25 February). On 20 March, she supported landings on Emirau Island, Bismarck Archipelago. Braine spent the ensuing months in escort work and training for the Marianas invasion.

==== Marianas ====
On 14 June, she took part in the bombardment of Tinian Island, and received minor damage from a small caliber shell but continued operations in the Marianas until 23 June. After spending almost a month in the United States, she sailed for the Philippines, via Pearl Harbor. Braine rendered fire support during the Leyte landings (20 October), and repelled an enemy air attack on 18 November.

=== 1945 ===
==== Philippines ====
From 4 to 15 January 1945, she participated in the Lingayen Gulf landings. Braine then proceeded to Manila Bay to support landings on the Bataan Peninsula and Corregidor (14–28 February 1945). She served as a radar picket and support ship for the landing forces at Zamboanga and subsequently at Pollack Harbor, Mindanao (17 March–23 April).

==== Okinawa, kamikaze hit ====
She took part in the Okinawa operations as a radar picket ship (16–25 May). On 27 May, the destroyer was hit in quick succession by two kamikazes, one of which was the youngest known kamikaze pilot, Yukio Araki. The first hit forward seriously damaged the bridge, and the second hit amidships blew number two funnel overboard and demolished the amidships superstructure. Braine retired to Kerama Retto, Ryukyu Islands, for emergency repairs; departed 19 June; and arrived in the United States 19 July 1945.

==== Repairs and decommissioning ====
On 21 July, Braine steamed to Boston for repairs and then proceeded to Charleston Navy Yard for inactivation. She was placed out of commission in reserve 26 July 1946 at Charleston.

=== 1951–1971 ===
Recommissioned 6 April 1951, Braine conducted training in the Atlantic and Caribbean and in the spring of 1952 sailed to the Mediterranean for duty with the 6th Fleet. In October, she returned to duty in coastal waters. She joined the 6th Fleet again in May 1953, and remained until October. Between October 1953 and 2 November 1954, she underwent a yard period, conducted refresher training in the Caribbean, and local operations in the vicinity of Newport. On 30 November 1954, she departed for the Pacific and became a unit of Cruisers-Destroyers Pacific Fleet, in mid-December 1954.

Early in January 1955, she proceeded to Yokosuka, Japan, and joined Task Force 77. Braine participated in the evacuation of the Tachen Islands in February and later operated on the Formosa patrol. She returned to the west coast 19 June 1955.

Braine's next departure from the west coast was on 13 February 1956, to conduct another Western Pacific cruise. She returned to California 22 July 1956 and operated in the San Diego and San Francisco areas.

In 1964, Braine was one of several ships that took part in the movie In Harm's Way.

On 17 August 1971, Braine was decommissioned, stricken from the US Navy List, and transferred to Argentina through the Security Assistance Program.

=== ARA Almirante Domecq Garcia ===
The Argentine Navy took possession of Braine on 17 August 1971 and renamed her ARA Almirante Domecq Garcia (D23) after Admiral Manuel Domecq Garcia.

The ship was commissioned at Treasure Island in San Francisco, California, in a ceremony attended by Admiral Garcia's daughter, Mrs. Eugenia Domecq Garcia de Forn. Commander Mario Eduardo Olmas assumed command and raised the flag of Argentina. USS Cowell (DD-547), also a Fletcher-class destroyer, was also acquired by Argentina in 1971 and renamed ARA Almirante Storni (D-24). Argentina had already acquired three destroyers of the Fletcher class in 1962: USS Stembel (DD-644), USS Dortch (DD-670), and USS Heermann (DD-532).

After minor repairs, Almirante Domecq Garcia (D-23) left California in October 1971, reaching El Callao, Argentina, in November. She arrived at the Naval Base of Puerto Belgrano and joined the fleet on 21 November 1971.

Between 1975 and 1980, she took part in a variety of roles, including exercises and surveillance. She overserved the British Royal Research Ship RRS Shackleton conducting oceanographic investigations in contested waters. She participated in joint exercises with the Brazilian ships Pernambuco and Maranhao in 1976, who were ships of the same class. She also took part in the UNITAS XVII, COMORAN IV and COMORAN VI exercises in 1976, 1977 and 1978 respectively.

During the Falklands War, Almirante Domecq Garcia operated near Bahia Blanca as a radar picket ship to provide early warning of British air attacks.

She also acted in a coastal patrol role, looking for fishing vessels operating illegally in Argentine waters.

On 30 November 1982 Almirante Domecq Garcia′s flag was lowered. She had steamed 123,000 nautical miles under the flag of Argentina. She was sunk as a target on 7 October 1983 off Mar del Plata by the combined action of an Exocet MM38 anti-ship missile launched by the corvette ARA Drummond and a torpedo fired by the submarine ARA San Luis. Her wreck lies at 39°57′S 057°57′W.

There is an alternate account of the sinking of the Almirante Domecq Garcia, with the logbook of the Argentine Navy patrol vessel ARA Francisco de Gurruchaga stating on 16 November 1986 that after the Francisco de Gurruchaga had towed her out to see and stopped her engines, she lost contact with the Almirante Domecq Garcia, indicating that she had sunk.

== Awards ==
Braine earned nine battle stars for her World War II service.
