= James A. Thompson (New York politician) =

American politician

Member of the New York State Senate from the 5th District
- In office January 1, 1907 – December 31, 1908
- Preceded by: James J. Kehoe
- Succeeded by: Barth S. Cronin

James A. Thompson (c. 1873 – December 4, 1923) was an American politician from New York.

== Career ==
Thompson was a member of the New York State Assembly (Kings Co., 8th D.) in 1905 and 1906. He was a member of the New York State Senate (5th D.) in 1907 and 1908.

== Death ==
He died on December 4, 1923, at his home in Long Beach. An investigation concluded that he was accidentally killed by inhaling gas while sleeping, after a pot of coffee boiled over, extinguishing the flame in a burner. He was buried at the Green-Wood Cemetery in Brooklyn.

== Sources ==
- Official New York from Cleveland to Hughes by Charles Elliott Fitch (Hurd Publishing Co., New York and Buffalo, 1911, Vol. IV; pg. 350, 352 and 366)
- EX-STATE SENATOR IS KILLED BY GAS in NYT on December 5, 1923 (subscription required)

New York State Assembly
Preceded by John C. L. Daly	New York State Assembly; Kings County, 8th District; 1905–1906	Succeeded by Thomas J. Farrell
New York State Senate
Preceded by James J. Kehoe	New York State Senate; 5th District; 1907–1908	Succeeded by Barth S. Cronin
