= USS Monticello =

USS Monticello may refer to the following ships of the United States Navy:

- USS Monticello (1859), was a wooden screw steamer launched in 1859, purchased in 1861, sold in 1865; foundered while in merchant service in 1872
- USS Monticello (AP-61), was built in 1928 as SS Conte Grande purchased by the US Navy and commissioned, 1942; decommissioned, 1946; returned to Italy in 1947
- USS Monticello (LSD-35), was a Thomaston-class dock landing ship commissioned in 1957 and decommissioned in 1985
