= James H. McCabe =

American politician

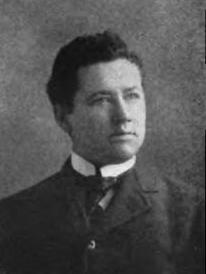

Member of the New York State Senate from the 5th District
- In office January 1, 1901 – December 31, 1904
- Preceded by: Michael J. Coffey
- Succeeded by: James J. Kehoe

Personal details
- Born: March 21, 1870 Vineland, New Jersey
- Died: January 20, 1957 (aged 86) Brooklyn, New York

James Henry McCabe (March 21, 1870 – January 20, 1957) was an American physician, lawyer and politician from New York.

== Life ==
He graduated from Public School No. 27 in 1886; and B.A. from Sacred Heart College, in Vineland, New Jersey, in 1891. Then he studied medicine, graduated M.D. from Long Island College Hospital in 1895, and practiced medicine in Brooklyn until 1920. McCabe was a member of the New York State Senate (5th D.) from 1901 to 1904, sitting in the 124th, 125th, 126th and 127th New York State Legislatures. He was U.S. Commissioner of the Second Judicial District from 1920 to 1927. He died on January 20, 1957, at his home at 624 Merrick Rd. in Brooklyn, "after a brief illness", and was buried at the Cemetery of the Holy Rood in Westbury, New York.

== Sources ==
- Official New York from Cleveland to Hughes by Charles Elliott Fitch (Hurd Publishing Co., New York and Buffalo, 1911, Vol. IV; pg. 365)
- The New York Red Book by Edgar L. Murlin (1903; pg. 91)
- Obit transcribed from the Brooklyn Daily Union on January 23, 1957; at RootsWeb

New York State Senate
Preceded by Michael J. Coffey	New York State Senate; 5th District; 1901–1904	Succeeded by James J. Kehoe
