= CSS Fanny =

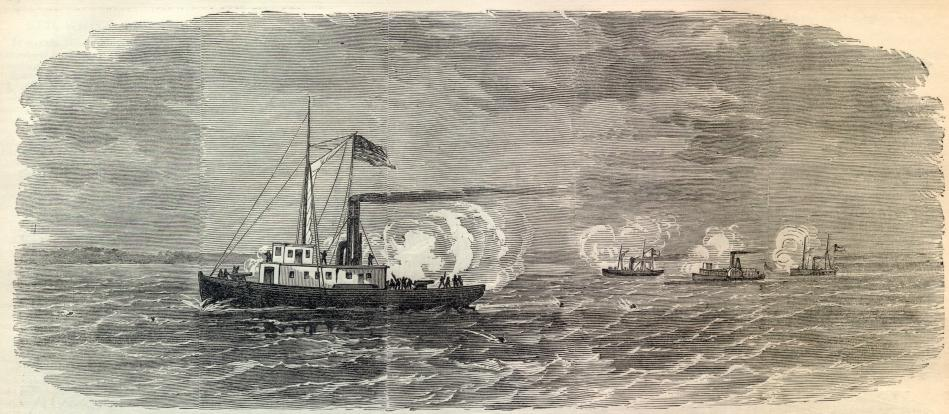
- Fanny being attacked at Chicamacomico by CSS Raleigh, CSS Curlew, and CSS Junaluska. Harper's Weekly

History
- Name: Fanny
- Launched: ?
- Commissioned: 1861
- Fate: Burned on February 10, 1862

General characteristics
- Type: Steam tug gunboat
- Displacement: ?
- Length: ?
- Beam: ?
- Draft: ?
- Propulsion: Steam engine powering 1 propeller
- Speed: ?
- Complement: 49
- Armament: 1 × 32-pounder (4.62-inch) Sawyer rifle (bow), 1 × 8-pounder rifled cannon (stern)

CSS Fanny was a small propeller-driven steam tug used by the Confederate States Navy to defend the sounds of northeastern North Carolina in the American Civil War. Originally armed as a gunboat and operated by the Union, she was captured in October 1861 by the Confederate Navy, and later lost at the Battle of Elizabeth City in February 1862. Due to being used as an observation balloon platform, Fanny is sometimes credited with being the first self-propelled aircraft carrier.

== Union service ==
The Fanny was originally operated by the United States Army Quartermaster Corps. On August 3, 1861, while on the James River, balloonist John La Mountain made an ascent from the deck of the Fanny to observe Confederate positions, making the Fanny a balloon carrier. Previous water-launched balloon flights had taken place on barges. Fanny was armed with a 4.62-inch Sawyer rifle forward (Described as a "32-pounder", based on projectile weight, by Confederates after her capture) and with an 8-pounder rifled cannon (possibly another Sawyer design) aft, and was active against Confederate shore positions. It was also part of the Battle of Hatteras Inlet Batteries, the initial invasion of the North Carolina Outer Banks by the Union on August 28–29, 1861. At some later time Fanny was commanded by a Lieutenant Crosby and reported the capture of the blockade runner Mary Emma at the headwaters of the Manokin River in Maryland.

== Capture and Confederate service ==
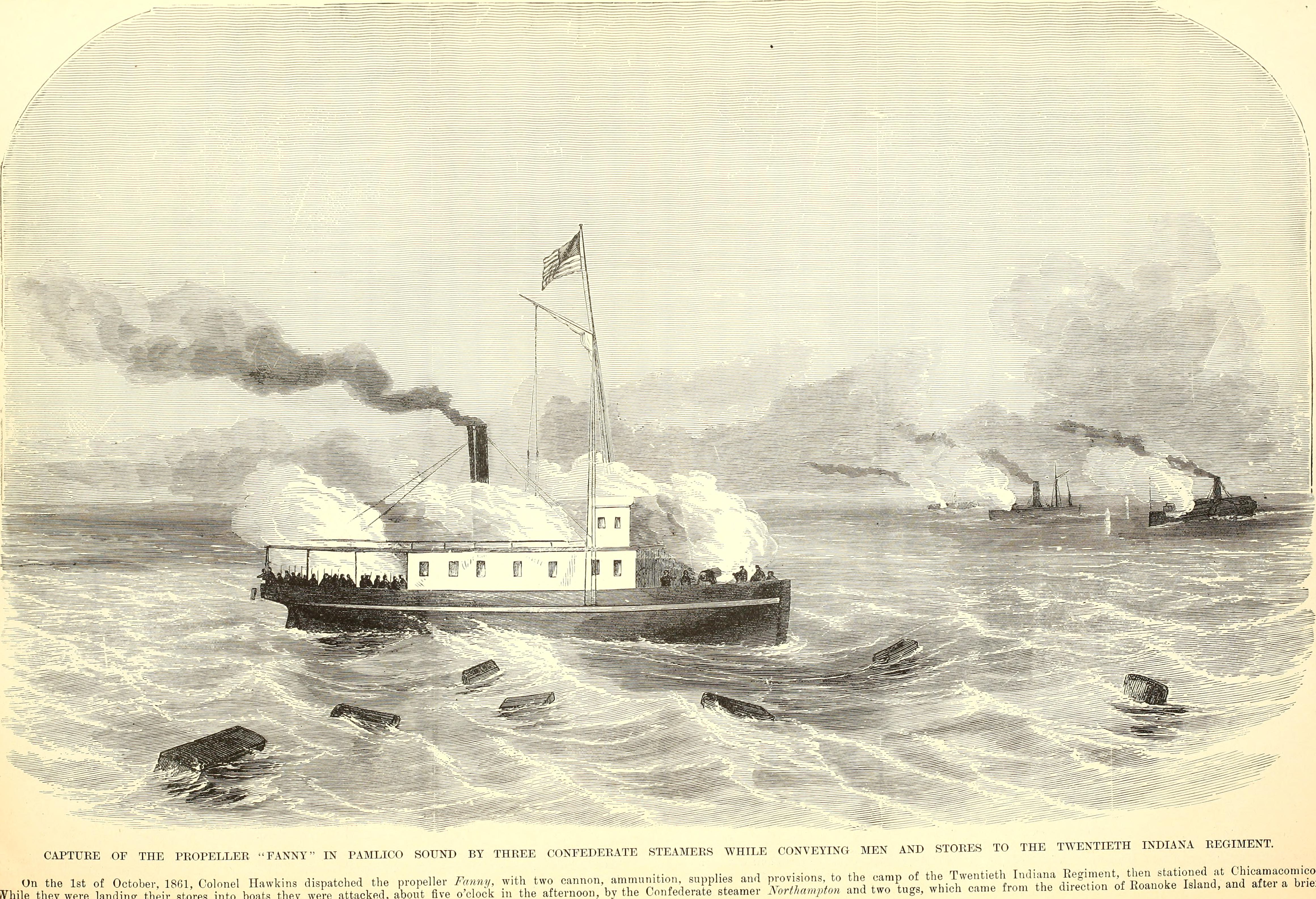
Capture of the Propeller Fanny by CSS Northumberland and two rebel tugs in Pamlico Sound by three Confederate Steamers while conveying men and stores to the Twentieth Indiana Regiment. Frank Leslie's Illustrated Newspaper

After the Federals captured Hatteras Inlet the Fanny was used to supply a Union army outpost at Chicamacomico, an Outer Banks settlement north of the Cape Hatteras Lighthouse. While at anchor there it was surprised by a Confederate gunboat squadron on 1 October 1861. This squadron consisted of the CSS Curlew, CSS Raleigh, and CSS Junaluska. The Curlew closed first while the other two gunboats circled around to cut off any escape attempt. After a brisk half-hour engagement the Fanny was run aground in Loggerhead Inlet and surrendered. A large quantity of commissary and quartermaster's stores was captured with the steamer. Also captured were members of Twentieth Indiana and the New York Zouaves. However, the Fanny's captain, J. H. Morrison, and his crew escaped, having essentially abandoned ship once the Confederate steamers approached. Refloated and taken into the Confederate States Navy, it was placed in command of Midshipman James Langhorne Tayloe, CSN, son of George Plater Tayloe of the Buena Vista estate in Roanoke, VA, and brother to George Edward, John William and Lomax, Tayloe, all officers in the Confederate States Army. Capt John L. Tayloe was later killed at the Battle of Hampton Roads.

== Chicamacomico incident ==
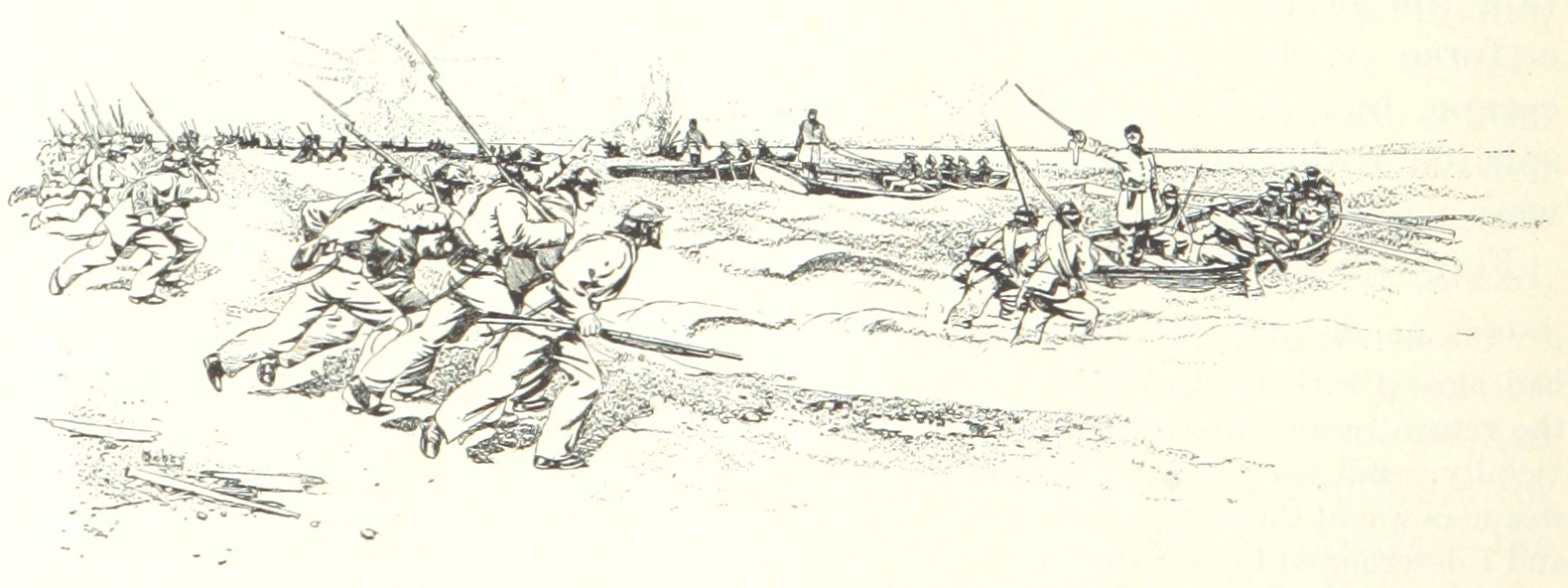
The Confederate forces retreat at Chicamacomico

Four days later the Fanny participated in a relatively large Confederate naval and army effort to 1) encircle and attack the Union encampment at Chicamacomico, 2) take and destroy the Cape Hatteras lighthouse, and 3) attempt to recapture the forts at Hatteras Inlet. The initial landing effort was successful, and the Union encampment at Chicamacomico was abandoned. However, the encirclement effort failed, and the Union troops were able to retreat back to the Hatteras Lighthouse. The next day Union reinforcements came up from Hatteras Inlet and chased the Confederate troops back to their transports. Both sides then retreated back to their base camps, the Union troops to Hatteras Inlet and the Confederate troops to Roanoke Island.

== Battles at Roanoke Island and Elizabeth City ==
The Fanny spent the next four months patrolling Pamlico Sound, reconnoitering Hatteras Inlet, and towing supply schooners to Roanoke Island. On 7–8 February 1862 the Fanny engaged the Union invasion force in the battle of Roanoke Island. The Fanny eventually retreated to Elizabeth City with the other surviving members of its gunboat squadron when ammunition supplies ran low. On 10 February the Fanny and the other gunboats were attacked by Federal gunboats advancing from Roanoke Island. In the ensuing battle it was run aground and blown up by her captain, Lt. James Tayloe Langhorne, who escaped with his crew to shore. Despite the damage, the Union was able to salvage the ship's main gun.

== Surviving gun ==
The 4.62-inch rifled gun from Fanny, called a "30-pounder Sawyer rifle", was preserved in the Washington Navy Yard, D.C. as of 2012. A Naval Historical Foundation web page notes that the weapon has an erroneous inscription stating that it was captured from the CSS Louisiana. The USS Louisiana was in the Elizabeth City battle, may have been involved in the pursuit and sinking of Fanny, and the recovery of the weapon.
