= Theodore Koehler =

American politician

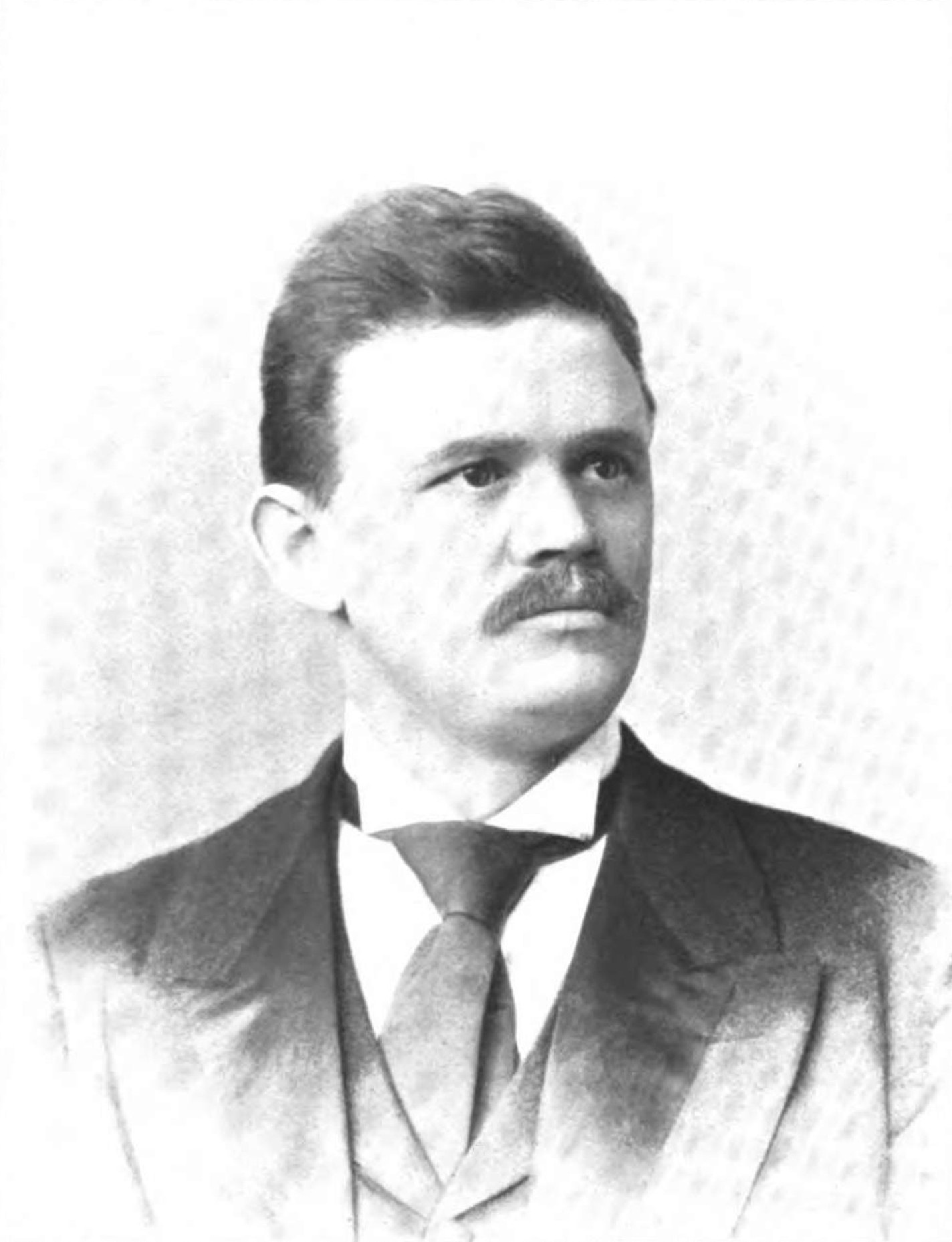
Theodore Koehler

Theodore Koehler (July 30, 1856 – March 27, 1929) was a German-American politician and accountant.

== Life ==
Koehler was born on July 30, 1856, in Ahrensbök, in what is now the Province of Schleswig-Holstein (it was then the Duchy of Holstein), the son of Theodore Koehler and Dorothea von Koepke. At the time he was born the area was under the control of Denmark. His maternal grandfather was knighted by Frederick VII of Denmark for valuable services rendered to the state, and his father was decorated with the Iron Cross for brave conduct in battle. In the 1860s the area would pass to control by the Kingdom of Prussia.

From 1871 to 1876, Koehler worked with a business house in Luebeck. In 1876, he joined the German Army as a sharpshooter. He then received a letter from a friend who previously immigrated to America that encouraged him to do the same. He received a discharge from the army and in 1876 arrived in Philadelphia, Pennsylvania, only to find out his friend had died. He spent the next several years working in various occupations, and in 1883 he was employed by an English firm to participate in an exploring expedition in South America. He represented the firm a year later at the World Cotton Centennial in New Orleans. In 1885, he became the head bookkeeper and auditor of a large industrial firm in Long Island City, New York. He was later appointed by Long Island City officials to examine and report on the condition of the city books. He was a strong advocate for a tunnel under Newtown Creek. He was elected town supervisor of Long Island City in 1892, and went on to serve as town supervisor for the next three years. By 1896, he was editor, cashier, and chief accountant for the East River Gas Company.

In 1895, Koehler was elected to the New York State Senate as a Democrat, representing New York's 2nd State Senate district (Queens County). He served in the Senate in 1896, 1897, and 1898. While in the Senate, he helped pass the first certified public accountant law in the United States, signed by Governor Morton in 1896. He then organized and incorporated the New York School of Accounts, the country's first institution to help students receive a C.P.A. degree, and he directed the school for 25 years. He also became head of his own accounting organization for 30 years, specializing in factory cost accounts, and authored a few accounting books. He was one of the oldest members of the Institute of Accounts of the City of New York, and was a member of the Society of Certified Public Accountants of the State of New York and the National Society of Public Accountants.

Koehler was a member of the Freemasons and the Shriners. In 1877, he married Bernardine Helmce of New Jersey. He later married Theodora Daub. Theodora was the first woman to receive a C.P.A. certificate, a member of Koehler's staff for several years, and co-author of one of his books.

Koehler died at his Astoria home on March 27, 1929. He was buried in Oakland Cemetery in Yonkers.

New York State Senate
Preceded by Michael J. Coffey	New York State Senate; 2nd District; 1896–1898	Succeeded by James Norton
