= James J. Kehoe =

American politician

James J Kehoe
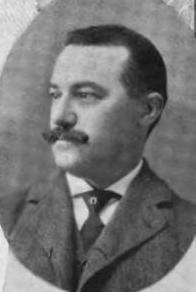

Member of the New York State Senate from the 5th District
- In office January 1, 1905 – December 31, 1906
- Preceded by: James H. McCabe
- Succeeded by: James A. Thompson

James J. Kehoe (1863–January 26, 1909) was an American politician from New York.

== Life ==
He was born in Brooklyn, and attended Public School No. 27. Then he became a teamster, and later a contractor. He married Margaret Devine (died 1930). Kehoe was a member of the New York State Assembly (Kings Co., 9th D.) in 1903 and 1904. He was a member of the New York State Senate (5th D.) in 1905 and 1906.

Kehoe died of pneumonia in his home at the age of 45.

== Sources ==
- Official New York from Cleveland to Hughes by Charles Elliott Fitch (Hurd Publishing Co., New York and Buffalo, 1911, Vol. IV; pg. 347f and 365)
- The New York Red Book by Edgar L. Murlin (1903; pg. 146)

New York State Assembly
Preceded by William P. Fitzpatrick	New York State Assembly; Kings County, 9th District; 1903–1904	Succeeded by James J. Byrne
New York State Senate
Preceded by James H. McCabe	New York State Senate; 5th District; 1905–1906	Succeeded by James A. Thompson
