= Daniel L. Braine =

United States Navy admiral

Daniel Lawrence Braine
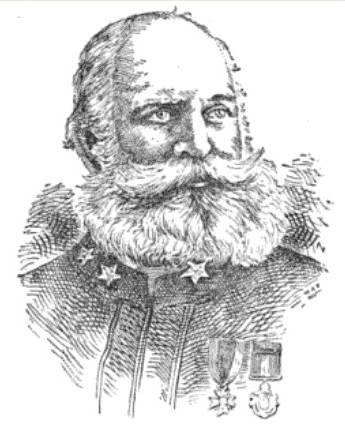
- Born: May 18, 1829; New York City, U.S.
- Died: January 30, 1898 (aged 68); Brooklyn, New York, U.S.
- Military career
- Allegiance: United States
- Branch: United States Navy
- Service years: 1846–1891
- Rank: Rear admiral
- Commands: USS Monticello; USS Juniata; South Atlantic Squadron
- Conflicts: Mexican–American War; American Civil War

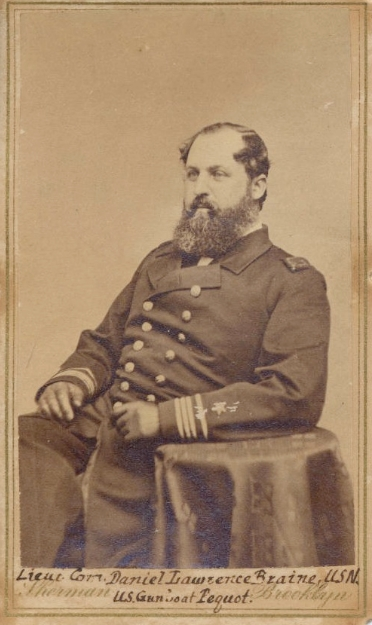
Lieutenant Commander Daniel L. Braine, c. 1862

Daniel Lawrence Braine (May 18, 1829 – January 30, 1898) was an admiral of the United States Navy.

== Early life ==
Born in New York City on May 18, 1829, Braine was appointed midshipman in 1846. He served on the Mississippi and the John Adams during the Mexican–American War.

== Civil War service ==
During the Civil War he commanded the Monticello and took part in an engagement with the rebel battery at Sewell's Point, in the first naval engagement of the war. He also took part in the attack and capture of Fort Hatteras and Fort Clarke and engaged the enemy at Kimmekerk Woods above Cape Hatteras. He was promoted to lieutenant commander in July 1862.

== Post-Civil War ==
Braine was promoted to commander in July 1866.

On November 1, 1871, he was elected as a Companion of the New York Commandery of the Military Order of the Loyal Legion of the United States – a military society of officers who had served the Union during the American Civil War. He was assigned insignia number 1338.

Between 1873 and 1875 he commanded the Juniata on its cruise to Greenland in search of the ill-fated Polaris Expedition. During this cruise, he was promoted to the rank of captain in 1874. In 1875, he took command of the receiving ship USS Colorado, after which he was assigned to command USS Powhatan. As a senior captain, Braine was permitted to use the customary title commodore beginning in 1885, and in late 1886 he was assigned to command the South Atlantic Squadron with promotion to rear admiral the following year. In 1889 he was assigned to command of the Brooklyn Navy Yard, where he served until his retirement.

== Retirement and death ==
Rear Admiral Braine retired from the Navy on May 18, 1891.

In 1895 he became a Veteran Companion of the New York Commandery of the Military Order of Foreign Wars and received insignia number 45.

He died in Brooklyn on January 30, 1898.

== Namesake ==
The destroyer USS Braine (DD-630), (1943–1971) was named in his honor.

== Dates of rank ==
- Midshipman, May 30, 1846.
- Passed Midshipman, June 8, 1852.
- Master, September 15, 1855.
- Lieutenant, September 16, 1855.
- Lieutenant Commander, July 16, 1862.
- Commander, July 25, 1866.
- Captain, December 11, 1874.
- Commodore, March 2, 1885.
- Rear Admiral, September 4, 1887.
- Retired List, May 18, 1891.
