= USS Monticello (1859) =

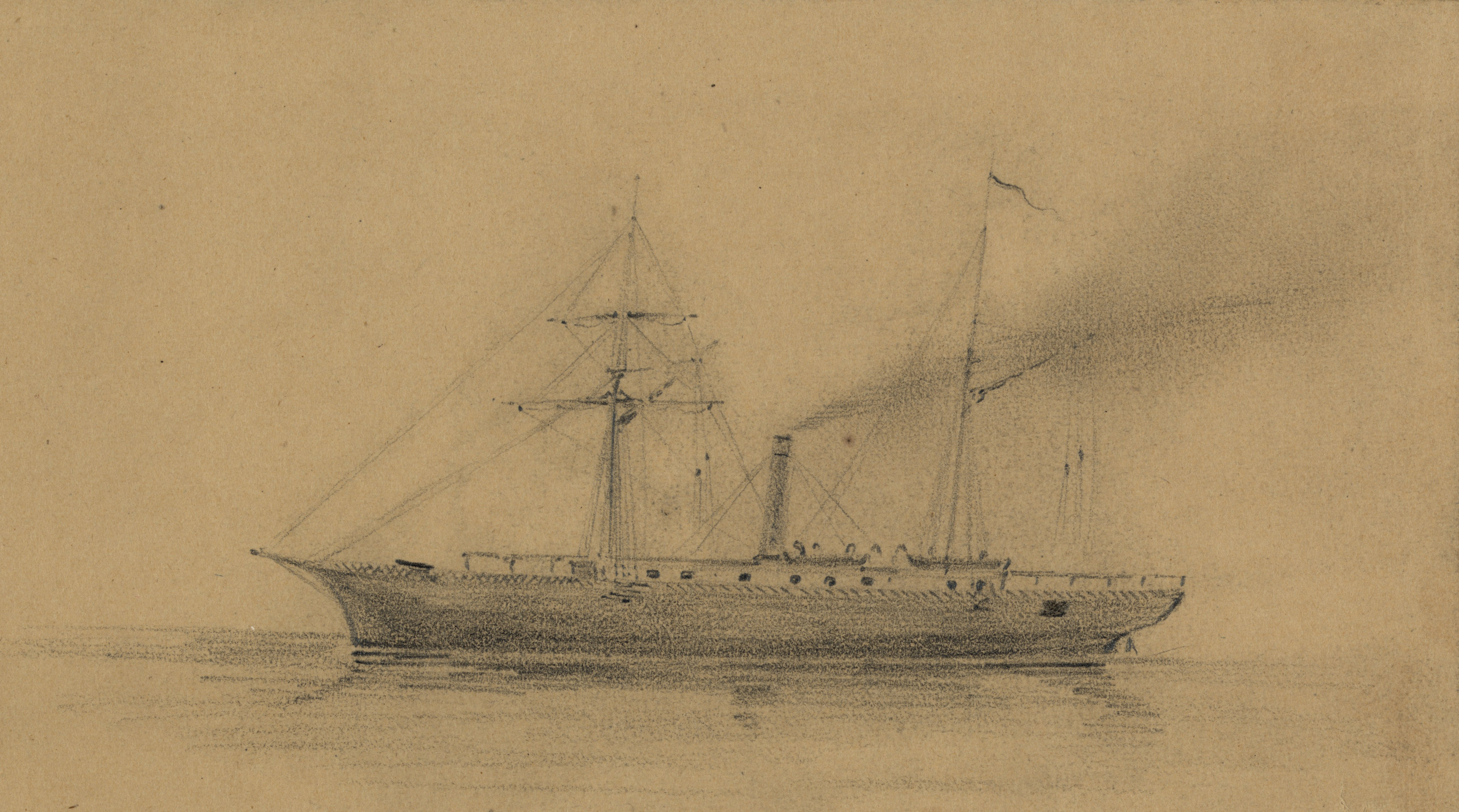
- USS Monticello in an American Civil War-era sketch by Alfred R. Waud

History

United States
- Name: USS Monticello
- Namesake: Monticello
- Laid down: 1859
- Acquired: by purchase, 12 September 1861
- Decommissioned: 24 July 1865
- Fate: Sold into merchant service 1 November 1865; Foundered 29 April 1872

General characteristics
- Type: Steamer
- Displacement: 655 long tons (666 t)
- Length: 180 ft (55 m)
- Beam: 29 ft (8.8 m)
- Draft: 12 ft 10 in (3.91 m)
- Propulsion: Steam engine; screw-propelled
- Speed: 11.5 kn (13.2 mph; 21.3 km/h)
- Armament: 1 × 9 in (230 mm) gun, 2 × 32-pounder guns

The first USS Monticello was a wooden screw-steamer in the Union Navy during the American Civil War. She was named for the home of Thomas Jefferson. She was briefly named Star in May 1861.

Monticello was built at Mystic, Connecticut, in 1859; chartered by the Navy in May 1861; and purchased on 12 September 1861 at New York from H. P. Cromwell & Company, for service in the Atlantic Blockading Squadron, Captain Henry Eagle in command.

== Construction and acquisition by the U.S. Navy ==
The Monticello was a schooner-rigged, iron braced, wooden screw-steamer built in Greenpoint, New York by E. F. Williams in 1859. It was named for the Virginia home of U.S. President.Thomas Jefferson. The steamer was chartered by the U.S. Navy in May 1861 and purchased on September 12, 1861 in New York from H. P. Cromwell & Company for service in the Atlantic Blockading Squadron. Captain Henry Eagle was placed in command of the vessel. Monticello was renamed Star on May 3, 1861, but resumed her original name on May 23.

== Naval service ==
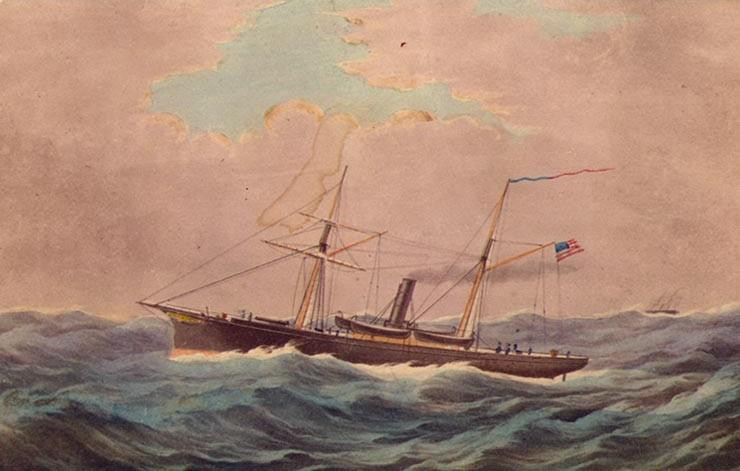
Colored print of Monticello, ca. 1860s

Seeing immediate action, Monticello relieved USS Baltimore in blockading the James River and preventing communication with the Elizabeth River on May 2, then relieved USS Quaker City at Cape Henry on the May 8. She engaged the batteries at Sewell's Point on May 18–19, then continued blockade duty until steaming up the Rappahannock River to Smith's Island on June 24. Operating in conjunction with the U.S. Army on the James River above Newport News, Virginia on July 5, she dispersed a body of Confederate cavalry. Often engaging Confederate batteries through the remainder of 1861, she was in the squadron that captured the batteries at Hatteras Inlet on August 28–29 in the first significant Union victory, one which greatly encouraged the North. The vessel was struck several times by artillery from Fort Hatteras during the engagement. The ship then reconnoitered Confederate defenses at Ocracoke Island before sailing for Hampton Roads. She bombarded a Confederate column and rescued an escaped Union prisoner near Chicamacomico on 6 October.

Departing Baltimore, Maryland on March 25, 1862 for the blockade of Wilmington, North Carolina, Monticello sent a boat party to the expedition up Little River on June 26 that destroyed two schooners. She engaged the batteries at New Inlet on July 12, and took British schooner Revere off Wilmington on October 11, 1862. After relieving USS Genesee on blockade at Shallow Inlet on November 15, Monticello destroyed British schooners Ariel and Ann while on duty on November 24. Monticello operated around Little River through 1863, taking British schooner Sun on 30 March, and steamer Old Fellow on April 15. She joined the expedition to Murrell's Inlet on April 25, and shelled a schooner there on May 12 with Conemaugh. In November, she destroyed salt works near Little River Inlet.

Monticello returned to blockade duty around Wilmington in January 1864. On February 29, the ship supported an expedition by Lieutenant William B. Cushing to Smithville capture General Louis Hébert at his plantation. Hébert was not present, but Cushing was able to capture his chief engineer, Captain Patrick Kelly.

On the morning of March 6, while the ship was sailing for Beaufort to refuel, the ensign on duty observed the USS Peterhoff in the vicinity of New Inlet. Mistakenly believing that it was a Confederate blockade runner, the ensign ordered the Monticello to ram the Peterhoff, causing it to rapidly sink. Cushing and the ship's acting lieutenant were officially excused of responsibility, though the ensign was found to have behaved with "irresponsibility and carelessness." In late June, Cushing launched another expedition from the Monticello, capturing a postal courier and obtaining intelligence about the fortifications at Fort Fisher.

In July, she joined in the chase after CSS Florida, and on 24 August attacked Confederate batteries at Masonboro Inlet. Monticello participated in the attacks on Fort Fisher on December 24–25, and on January 13–14, 1865. She took the surrender of Fort Caswell on January 18–19, then participated in the Little River expedition of February 4–6.

== Decommissioning and fate ==
After the war, Monticello decommissioned on July 24, 1865 at Portsmouth, New Hampshire, and was sold at public auction at Boston, Massachusetts to W. H. Lincoln on November 1. She was registered for merchant service on July 25, 1866.

Beginning in 1870, the Monticello, following a refit, was engaged in seal hunting off the coast of Newfoundland. While engaged in this activity in 1872, the ship's stempost, sternpost, and propeller were damaged by ice. After attempting to dock at St. John's but finding the port full, the vessel made way for Boston with its crew and some passengers. On April 29, while crossing the Gulf of St. Lawrence, she was caught in a gale and smashed with ice, subsequently foundering. All of the crew and passengers survived, being rescued by a fishing schooner and taken to Saint-Pierre. Financially, the vessel was considered a $60,000 loss. Her Civil War-era silk naval ensign is held by the Graveyard of the Atlantic Museum.

== See also ==
- Confederate States Navy

== Works cited ==
- American Lloyd's Registry of American and Foreign Shipping. New York: E. & G. W. Blunt. 1862.
- Barrett, John G. (1963). The Civil War in North Carolina. Chapel Hill: The University of North Carolina Press. ISBN 0-8078-0874-1.
- Goode, George Brown, ed. (1887). The Fisheries and Fishery Industries of the United States, Section V. Vol. II. Washington D.C.: U.S. Government Printing Office.
- Mallison, Fred M. (2024). The Civil War on the Outer Banks : A History of the Late Rebellion Along the Coast of North Carolina from Carteret to Currituck, with Comments on Prewar Conditions and an Account of Postwar Recovery. Jefferson: McFarland. ISBN 9781476621593.
