= CSS Curlew =

Ship of the Confederate Navy in the American Civil War

Coordinates: 35°53′08″N 75°45′41″W

- Burning of the Confederate gunboat Curlew, off Fort Forrest, Feb. 7, 1862

History

Confederate States
- Name: Curlew
- Namesake: Curlew
- Launched: 1856
- Commissioned: 1861
- Fate: Run aground and burned on February 7, 1862

General characteristics
- Displacement: 236 tons
- Length: 135 ft (41 m)
- Beam: 23 ft 6 in (7.16 m)
- Depth of hold: 8 ft (2.4 m)
- Propulsion: 1 walking beam steam engine powering side paddlewheels
- Speed: 12 mph (19 km/h)
- Complement: 22 (1861), 30 (1862)
- Armament: 1 × rifled 32 pounder (bow), 1 × 12 pounder (stern)

CSS Curlew was an iron-hull North Carolina Sounds paddlewheel steamboat that was taken into the Confederate Navy in 1861. It was run aground at Fort Forrest and burned in the battle for Roanoke Island on February 8, 1862. Its wreck was discovered in 1988 and archaeologically investigated in 1994.

== The steamboat ==
Curlew was built in 1856 by the Harlan & Hollingsworth Iron Shipbuilding Company of Wilmington, Delaware. It was 135 feet (41 m) long, 23 feet (7.0 m) wide, 8-foot (2.4 m) depth of hold, and listed at 236 tons. Its average draft was 5 feet (1.5 m), which suited the shallow waters of the North Carolina sounds. The steamboat had side paddle wheels that were 18 feet (5.5 m) in diameter by 8 feet (2.4 m) wide. Curlew had no figurehead, a round stern, and no mast. A walking beam engine with a 29-inch (740 mm) diameter cylinder and a 9-foot (2.7 m) stroke powered the new steamer. This type of engine had a distinctive trapezoid-shaped rocker arm mounted between the paddle wheels, which transmitted power from the piston rod to the crank on the paddle wheel shaft. For improved efficiency, Curlew's engine was equipped with Sickle's patented cutoff valve. Steam was provided by a two furnace return-flue boiler 18 feet (5.5 m) long, 7 feet (2.1 m) high, and 8 feet (2.4 m) wide, and rated at 30 lbf/in^{2} (210 kPa) of pressure. It started operating in North Carolina in July 1856.

== History ==
Curlew was built for Thomas D. Warren, a doctor and plantation owner from Edenton, North Carolina. It was operated for passenger and cargo transportation in the Albemarle Sound region, running between Edenton, Hertford, Elizabeth City and Nag's Head. Curlew also made trips up the Chowan River to Franklin, Virginia. Its first captain was Richard Halsey, who was later replaced by Thomas Burbage in 1858.

Curlew made many trips to the Nag's Head Hotel, which in those days was a popular tourist destination. In 1859 Edward Bruce, an artist and reporter, rode the ship on a trip to Nag's Head and afterwards wrote about it for Harper's New Monthly Magazine. He singled out Curlew and its crew for special praise:

We never saw him (Captain Burbage) rave. Always at his post, and always quiet, everything went on like clockwork. No traveler accustomed to the privileged usage on many similar craft would have imagined that one of them could be so well managed with so little damage to the Third Commandment.

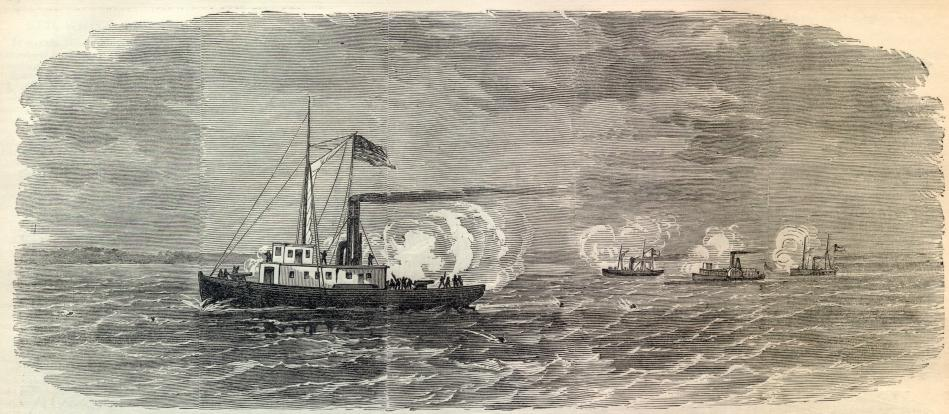
CSS Curlew captures Fanny.

After the Civil War broke out, Curlew was initially used as a troop transport, ferrying troops and supplies to various defensive works along the North Carolina coast. Curlew was acquired by the Confederate Navy after Hatteras Inlet fell to Union forces in August 1861. It was outfitted with one rifled 32-pounder cannon in the bow and one 12-pounder smoothbore cannon in the stern. Under the command of Thomas T. Hunter (also known as "Tornado" Hunter) it was involved in the capture of the U.S. Army supply boat Fanny at Chicamacomico on October 1, 1861.

Between October 1861 and February 1862, Curlew alternately patrolled Pamlico Sound and harassed Union shipping at Hatteras Inlet. On February 7, Curlew and eight other Confederate gunboats attempted to repel the Union invasion of Roanoke Island. During this battle, Curlew was holed by a shell and was run aground to keep from sinking. It did so directly in front of Fort Forrest, a set of anchored barges equipped with seven guns, blocking the guns from service. The next day the ship was set on fire when the Confederate forces on Roanoke Island surrendered. The remaining Confederate gunboats withdrew to Elizabeth City, where all but two were destroyed or captured on February 10 in the Battle of Elizabeth City.

Ensign of CSS Curlew

Afterwards, Captain Hunter commented to another gunboat captain that during the battle he suddenly realized that his pants were gone, even though he knew he put on a pair that morning.

Curlew's engine was salvaged in 1863, after which the wreck was allowed to decay. It was located in 1988 by a group of international divers working for the state of North Carolina's Underwater Archaeological Unit. Its identity was confirmed when one of the divers, Takafumi Yamaguchi, recovered the builders plate. In 1994 the wreck was documented by state divers and students from East Carolina University.

=== Eli Williamson, pilot ===
When Curlew was impressed into service for the Confederate Navy, its long-term pilot, a black Freedman named Eli Williamson, was also taken on. Williamson – who named one of his daughters Curlew – had his right arm broken by the shattered wheel of the ship in the Battle of Roanoke Island. On the basis of his service on Curlew, Williamson applied for and received a Civil War pension from the state of North Carolina in 1905, becoming probably the first African American to successfully do so. Although the North Carolina General Assembly would later award pensions to a small number of blacks by private bills, and, in 1927, allowed them to apply for a newly established "Class B" pension, Williamson's pension was awarded under the original authorizing act.

When Williamson died in 1915, obituaries in Southern newspapers described him as "a follower of the Confederacy", and an article a year before he died said that "he still remained loyal to the South till the end of the war." However, in 1874, Williamson applied to the Southern Claims Commission for reimbursement for a horse and cart taken by Union raiders in July 1863. One of the necessary criteria for having such a claim succeed was that the claimant must have remained loyal to the Union throughout the course of the war. Benjamin Weston, who testified for Williamson, confirmed that "like all his race", Williamson was always a loyal Unionist. Williamson's daughter also stated that "although working for the Confederacy, he helped many Union soldiers..."

When Williamson left North Carolina to live in Washington, D.C., and therefore lost his state pension, an appeal was published in 1914 in the Albemarle Observer by a white ship captain, George Withy, asking for donations from white Southerners to help this "faithful old darkey". Withy wrote that "[A]fter the Battle of Roanoke Island this old darkey could have gone over to the Federals in the capacity of a Pilot ... [but] prefer[red] to stay loyal to his friends and the South." The appeal did not mention that when he had recovered from his broken arm, Williamson avoided returning to service in the Confederate Navy. Southern newspapers which reprinted the obituary from a Washington, D.C. paper omitted a sentence which detailed that "The Confederates kept a strict guard over Williamson until the close of the war", and one paper even claimed that Williamson had received an honorable discharge from the navy, which, as an impressed sailor and not a volunteer, he would not have needed. These falsehoods and overlooked facts helped to contribute to the myth of the loyal "Black Confederate" which is part of the overriding myth of the Lost Cause of the Confederacy.
