= Battle of Hampton Roads order of battle =

The following forces and commanders fought at the Battle of Hampton Roads, Virginia, March 8–9, 1862.

== Union ==
US Army (stationed at Fort Monroe)

- 1st Brigade, 1st Division, Dept of Virginia - Brig. Gen. Joseph K. F. Mansfield
  - 20th Indiana Infantry Regiment - Colonel William Brown
  - 7th New York Volunteer Infantry - Colonel George W. Von Schack
  - 11th New York Volunteer Infantry Regiment - Colonel Charles M. Loeser

US Navy

- North Atlantic Blocking Squadron - Captain (Flag Officer) Louis M. Goldsborough
    - Senior officer present: Captain John Marston
  - Ironclad monitor:
    - Monitor - Lieutenant John L. Worden
  - 50-gun screw frigates:
    - Minnesota - Captain Gershom J. Van Brunt
    - Roanoke - Captain John Marston
  - 44-gun sailing frigates:
    - St. Lawrence - Captain Hugh Y. Purviance
    - Congress - Lieutenant Joseph B. Smith
  - 24-gun sailing sloop-of-war:
    - Cumberland - Lieutenant George U. Morris (acting)
  - auxiliary gunboats:
    - Mystic
    - Zouave - Acting Master Henry Reaney
    - Dragon - Acting Master William Watson
  - miscellaneous support craft
    - Whitehall (tug) - Acting Master William J. Baulsir
    - Young America (tug)
    - Cambridge (tug) - Commander William A. Parker

== Confederate ==
CS Navy

- Office of Orders and Details (responsible for naval defenses of Norfolk) - Captain (Flag Officer) Franklin Buchanan
  - Ironclad:
    - Virginia - Captain Franklin Buchanan, Lieutenant Catesby ap Roger Jones
  - Tender gunboats
    - Raleigh - Lieutenant Joseph W. Alexander
    - Beaufort - Lieutenant William H. Parker
- James River Squadron - Commander John R. Tucker
  - Gunboats
    - Patrick Henry - Commander John R. Tucker
    - Jamestown - Lieutenant Joseph N. Barney
    - Teaser - Lieutenant William A. Webb
