= List of shipwrecks in February 1862 =

The list of shipwrecks in February 1862 includes ships sunk, foundered, grounded, or otherwise lost during February 1862.

== 1 February ==
List of shipwrecks: 1 February 1862
Ship	State	Description
Bjarke	Denmark	The ship sank in the River Towy. She was on a voyage from Middelfart to Carmarthen, United Kingdom.
Cairo	United Kingdom	The steamship was driven ashore at Ancona, Papal States. She was on a voyage from Liverpool, Lancashire to Trieste. She was refloated the next day and taken in to Ancona.
Dream	United Kingdom	The ship was wrecked on Aldabra Island, Seychelles and was subsequently caught fire. She was on a voyage from Bombay, India to Liverpool.
Emily	United Kingdom	The ship was driven ashore at Rye, Sussex.
Lydia and Martha	Confederate States of America	American Civil War: Confederate forces scuttled the schooner as a blockship below Weir's Point off Roanoke Island, North Carolina.
Sarah	United Kingdom	The brig was run into by the steamship Möwe (Bremen) and sank in the River Thames at Tilbury Fort, Essex. Her crew survived. Sarah was on a voyage from Sunderland, County Durham to London.
Yorkshire	United Kingdom	The ship departed from New York, United States for Liverpool. No further trace, presumed foundered with the loss of all hands.

== 2 February ==
List of shipwrecks: 2 February 1862
Ship	State	Description
Isabella and Dorothy	United Kingdom	The barque was wrecked off "Famajusta", Jamaica. Her crew were rescued. She was on a voyage from Beyrout, Ottoman Syria to "Sumsal".
John Etherden	United Kingdom	The sailing barge collided with the schooner Eliza and sank in the River Thames. She was on a voyage from Faversham, Kent to Lambeth, Surrey.

== 3 February ==
List of shipwrecks: 3 February 1862
Ship	State	Description
Macao	United Kingdom	The ship departed from Melbourne, Victoria for Manila, Spanish East Indies. No further trace, presumed foundered with the loss of all hands.
Phoenix	(Russian Empire) Grand Duchy of Finland	The ship caught fire in the Atlantic Ocean and was abandoned. Her crew were rescued by Isabel (United Kingdom). Phoenix was on a voyage from London, United Kingdom to Rangoon, Burma.
Sefton	United Kingdom	The schooner ran aground on the Longsand, in the North Sea off the coast of Essex. She was on a voyage from Poole, Dorset to Goole, Yorkshire. She was refloated and assisted in to Harwich, Essex.

== 4 February ==
List of shipwrecks: 4 February 1862
Ship	State	Description
Don	United Kingdom	The brig was run down and sunk off Flamborough Head, Yorkshire by the brig Alderman (United Kingdom) with the loss of two of her crew. Don was on a voyage from Seaham, County Durham to London.
Grange	United Kingdom	The ship was driven ashore at Kingstown, County Dublin. She was on a voyage from Dublin to Cardiff Glamorgan. She was refloated.
Moore	United Kingdom	The brig was driven onto the Copt Rocks, on the Kent coast.
Prince Albert	United Kingdom	The ship struck the Highland Rock and sank. Her crew were rescued. She was on a voyage from Ardrossan, Ayrshire to Runcorn, Cheshire.
Queen of the South	United Kingdom	The ship was wrecked in the Moscos Islands, Burma. All on board were rescued. She was on a voyage from Penang, Straits Settlements to Rangoon, Burma.
Schulan	Hamburg	The tugboat ran aground on the Grodener Stock. She capsized and sank the next day.
HMS Snake	Royal Navy	The Arrow-class gunvessel ran aground on the Encounter Rock. Subsequently refloated, repaired and returned to service.

== 5 February ==
List of shipwrecks: 5 February 1862
Ship	State	Description
Arbutus, and Duke	United Kingdom	The steamship Arbutus ran aground off "North Twin Island", in the Belfast Lough, colliding with the schooner Duke, which ran ashore on that island. Arbutus was on a voyage from Belfast, County Antrim to Lancaster, Lancashire. She was refloated and resumed her voyage. Duke was on a voyage from Glasgow, Renfrewshire to Belfast. She was refloated the next day and taken in to Belfast.
Betsy	United Kingdom	The ship ran aground on the Skullmartin Rocks, in the Belfast Lough. She was on a voyage from Poole, Dorset to Belfast, County Antrim.
Caroline	United Kingdom	The ship was driven ashore at Le Portel, Pas-de-Calais, France.
Duke	United Kingdom	The ship was run into by a steamship and was beached in the River Lagan.
Erin	United Kingdom	The schooner was driven ashore and wrecked 6 nautical miles (11 km) west of Calais, France. She was on a voyage from Sunderland, County Durham to Le Tréport, Seine-Inférieure, France.
Endeavour	United Kingdom	The sloop collided with a schooner off Flamborough Head, Yorkshire and was abandoned. She was taken in to King's Lynn, Norfolk in a derelict condition.
Nouveau Cantabre	France	The barque was driven ashore and wrecked at Sangatte, Pas-de-Calais.
HMS Pantaloon	Royal Navy	The Racer-class sloop ran aground off Point Mannhané, on the east coast of Africa and was severely damaged. She was later refloated and towed in to Bombay, India by HMS Orestes (Royal Navy), where she arrived on 10 May.
Woodside	United Kingdom	The ship was wrecked on the Laugharne Sands, in Carmarthen Bay.

== 6 February ==
List of shipwrecks: 6 February 1862
Ship	State	Description
David Lyon	United Kingdom	The ship was wrecked at Savanna-la-Mar, Jamaica.
Elizabeth	United Kingdom	The ship was wrecked at Redcar, Yorkshire. She was on a voyage from North Berwick, Lothian to London.
Modern Times	United States	The ship departed from New York for Bristol, Gloucestershire, United Kingdom. No further trace, presumed foundered with the loss of all hands.

== 7 February ==
List of shipwrecks: 7 February 1862
Ship	State	Description
CSS Appleton Belle	Confederate States Navy	American Civil War: The 103-ton paddle steamer was burned on the Tennessee River at the mouth of the Duck River near Paris, Tennessee, to prevent her capture by Union forces.
Britius	United Kingdom	The ship departed from New York, United States for Queenstown, County Cork. No further trace, presumed foundered with the loss of all hands.
CSS Curlew	Confederate States Navy	Illustration of CSS Curlew burning American Civil War, Battle of Roanoke Island: After a Union 100-pound (45.4-kg) shell tore through her iron plating and magazine, the armed sidewheel tug was beached off Fort Forrest and then sank in Croatan Sound off the northwestern end Roanoke Island, North Carolina. Confederate forces burned and blew up her wreck on 8 February to prevent its capture by Union forces.
E. H. Herbert	United States	The steam tug sank without loss of life off North Carolina near New Inlet. The schooner William H. Mailler (flag unknown) rescued her crew.
Janet and Mary	United Kingdom	The schooner ran aground at Shoreham-by-Sea, Sussex. She was refloated.
Julius	Confederate States of America	American Civil War: The steamer was burned on the Tennessee River at Florence, Alabama, to prevent her capture by United States Navy gunboats.
CSS Lynn Boyd	Confederate States Navy	American Civil War: The 227-ton paddle steamer was burned on the Tennessee River at the mouth of the Duck River to prevent her capture by Union forces.
Minerva	United Kingdom	The brig ran aground at Drogheda, County Louth. Her four crew were rescued by the Drogheda Lifeboat.
Nelson	United Kingdom	The ship struck the Oyster Rocks, off Jersey, Channel Islands. She was on a voyage from Newcastle upon Tyne, Northumberland to Saint Helier, Jersey. She was refloated and taken in to Saint Aubin, Jersey in a waterlogged condition.
Reward	United Kingdom	The ship was driven ashore at Shoreham-by-Sea. She was on a voyage from Hartlepool, County Durham to Shoreham-by-Sea. She was refloated.
CSS Samuel Orr	Confederate States Navy	American Civil War: The 279-ton sternwheel paddle steamer, in use as a hospital boat, was burned on the Tennessee River at the mouth of the Duck River to prevent her capture by Union forces.
CSS Time	Confederate States Navy	American Civil War: The sidewheel paddle steamer was burned on the Tennessee River at Florence, Alabama, to prevent her capture by United States Navy gunboats.

== 8 February ==
List of shipwrecks: 8 February 1862
Ship	State	Description
Eliza	United Kingdom	The ship sank off "Helwick Head". She was on a voyage from Dungarvan, County Waterford to Cardiff, Glamorgan.
Fox	United Kingdom	The smack sprang a leak and foundered in the North Sea 4 nautical miles (7.4 km) north east of Dunbar, Lothian. Her crew survived. She was on a voyage from Fraserburgh, Aberdeenshire to Newcastle upon Tyne, Northumberland.
Gala	United Kingdom	The ship ran aground on The Shingles, off the Isle of Wight. She was on a voyage from Gravesend, Kent to Kurrachee, India. She was refloated.
CSS Muscle	Confederate States of America	American Civil War: The cargo steamer was captured by the gunboats USS Conestoga, USS Lexington, and USS Tyler. She sprang a leak and sank in the Tennessee River while under tow by Union forces to Cerro Gordo, Tennessee.
Planter	United Kingdom	The schooner was run down and sunk off the Happisburgh Lighthouse, Norfolk by the brig Mathew (United Kingdom) with the loss of a crew member. Survivors were rescued by Mathew. Planter was on a voyage from Goole, Yorkshire to Dover, Kent.
Sam Kirkman	Confederate States of America	American Civil War: The sternwheel paddle steamer was burned on the [Tennessee River at Florence, Alabama, to prevent her capture by Union forces.
CSS Sea Bird	Confederate States Navy	American Civil War, Battle of Roanoke Island: The sidewheel paddle steamer was rammed and sunk near Roanoke Island, North Carolina, by the gunboat Commodore Perry (United States Navy) with the loss of two crew killed and four wounded. The gunboat USS Valley City (United States Navy) destroyed her machinery.
Tiberius	United Kingdom	The ship departed from New York, United States for Queenstown, County Cork. No further trace, presumed foundered with the loss of all hands.
Venus	United Kingdom	The brig ran aground at Poole, Dorset. She was on a voyage from Hartlepool, County Durham to Poole. She was refloated and taken in to Pool in a leaky condition.
Unnamed	United Kingdom	The brigantine foundered off Land's End, Cornwall with the loss of all hands.
Unnamed	United Kingdom	The brig foundered off Land's End with the loss of all hands.
Unnamed	United Kingdom	The barque foundered off Land's End with the loss of all hands.
Unnamed	United Kingdom	The full-rigged ship foundered off Land's End with the loss of all hands.
Unnamed	Austrian Empire	The barque was driven ashore and wrecked on the coast of Cornwall with the loss of all hands.

== 9 February ==
List of shipwrecks: 9 February 1862
Ship	State	Description
Anna Rebecca	United Kingdom	The ship was driven ashore at Flamborough Head, Yorkshire. She was on a voyage from London to Hartlepool, County Durham. She was refloated and towed in to Grimsby, Lincolnshire by the smack True Ambassador (United Kingdom).
Magnolia	United Kingdom	The brig was driven ashore in the Yangtze. She was on a voyage from Foo Chow Foo, China to London.

== 10 February ==
List of shipwrecks: 10 February 1862
Ship	State	Description
Alfonse	Spain	The ship was driven ashore at Wells-next-the-Sea, Norfolk, United Kingdom.
CSS Appomattox	Confederate States Navy	American Civil War, Battle of Elizabeth City: The armed steamer was burned by her crew at the entrance to the Dismal Swamp Canal near Elizabeth City, North Carolina, to prevent her capture by Union forces. She blew up when the flames reached her store of gunpowder.
CSS Black Warrior	Confederate States Navy	American Civil War], Battle of Elizabeth City: The schooner was burned by her crew at Elizabeth City, to prevent her capture by Union forces.
Costanza	Italy	The ship sank off Lipari. She was on a voyage from "Ballagich" to Genoa.
CSS Fanny	Confederate States Navy	American Civil War, Battle of Elizabeth City: The armed screw steamer was forced aground by the armed sidewheel paddle steamer USS John L. Lockwood (United States Navy) at Elizabeth City, and set afire. The gunboat USS Valley City (United States Navy) destroyed her machinery.
CSS Forrest	Confederate States Navy	American Civil War], Battle of Elizabeth City: The gunboat was out of the water on a marine railway undergoing repairs at Elizabeth City when she was burned to prevent her capture by Union forces.
Friends	United Kingdom	The ship was driven ashore at Sharpness Point, Gloucestershire.
Lively	United Kingdom	The ship was driven ashore at Wells-next-the-Sea. She was on a voyage from Danzig to London.
Marksman	United Kingdom	The ship was driven ashore near Pula, Austrian Empire. She was on a voyage from Venice, Kingdom of Lombardy–Venetia to Liverpool, Lancashire.
Mayflower	United Kingdom	The brig ran aground on the East Gare Sand, off the mouth of the River Tees. Her eight crew were rescued by the Seaton Carew Lifeboat.
CSS M. C. Etheridge	Confederate States Navy	American Civil War, Union blockade: Carrying a cargo of naval stores, the 144-ton schooner was set afire by her crew when the gunboat USS Whitehead (United States Navy) attacked her on the Pasquotank River on the coast of North Carolina. Unable to extinguish the fire, Whitehead's crew scuttled her.
Providence	United Kingdom	The brig was wrecked on the Long Scarr Rocks, on the coast of County Durham. Her eight crew were rescued by the Seaton Carew Lifeboat.
Unidentified gunboat	Confederate States Navy	American Civil War, Battle of Elizabeth City: The incomplete gunboat was captured and burned by Union forces while still on the building ways at Elizabeth City.
Unidentified schooner	Confederate States of America	American Civil War, Battle of Elizabeth City: The schooner was burned at the wharves at Elizabeth City, after Union forces captured the city.

== 11 February ==
List of shipwrecks: 11 February 1862
Ship	State	Description
Drie Gezusters	Netherlands	The ship ran aground and was wrecked on Blanoxland, in the North Sea. Her crew were rescued. She was on a voyage from an English port to the Weser.
Jessie	United Kingdom	The brig ran aground on the Corton Sand, in the North Sea off the coast of Suffolk. She was on a voyage from London to South Shields, County Durham. She was refloated and taken in to Lowestoft, Suffolk.
Jeune Sophie	France	The ship was driven ashore in the La Teignouse Channel. She was on a voyage from Swansea, Glamorgan, United Kingdom to the Loire. She was refloated and put in to Le Palais, Morbihan.
Raven	United Kingdom	The ship ran aground at Dunkirk, Nord, France. She was on a voyage from Dunkirk to Cork. She was refloated and resumed her voyage, but consequently put in to Dover, Kent in a leaky condition.
Swift	United Kingdom	The ship departed from Ramsgate, Kent for Tenerife, Canary Islands. No further trace, presumed foundered with the loss of all hands.

== 12 February ==
List of shipwrecks: 12 February 1862
Ship	State	Description
Duen	United Kingdom	The sloop ran aground and capsized at Ballyness, County Donegal. She was on a voyage from Derry to Ballyness.
Golconda	France	The ship was driven ashore and wrecked at Cocanada, India. She was on a voyage from Marseille, Bouches-du-Rhône to Masulipatam, India.
Oriental	United Kingdom	The barque caught fire at English Harbour, Antigua and was scuttled the next day. She was on a voyage from Demerara, British Guiana to London. She was refloated on 15 February.

== 13 February ==
List of shipwrecks: 13 February 1862
Ship	State	Description
Adah	United Kingdom	The brig was wrecked in Placentia Bay. She was on a voyage from Boston, Massachusetts, United States to Saint John's, Newfoundland, British North America.
Lord Seaton	United Kingdom	The ship ran aground on the Cross Sand, in the North Sea off the coast of Norfolk. She was on a voyage from South Shields, County Durham to Barcelona, Spain. She was refloated and resumed her voyage.
Swan	United Kingdom	The barque sank at Milford Haven, Pembrokeshire.

== 14 February ==
List of shipwrecks: 14 February 1862
Ship	State	Description
Edisto	Confederate States of America	American Civil War, Union blockade: The sloop, carrying a cargo of rice, was destroyed in Bulls Bay off the coast of South Carolina, by an armed boat from the barque USS Restless (United States Navy).
Elizabeth	Confederate States of America	American Civil War, Union blockade: The schooner, carrying a cargo of rice, was destroyed in Bulls Bay off the coast of South Carolina by an armed boat from the barque USS Restless (United States Navy).
Lucy E. Ashby	United States	The full-rigged ship was driven ashore in the Yangtze.
Lynnhaven	Confederate States of America	American Civil War: Captured while carrying a cargo of corn near Elizabeth City, North Carolina, by the sidewheel gunboat USS Delaware (United States Navy) on 10 February, the vessel was scuttled as a blockship at the mouth of the Albemarle and Chesapeake Canal in North Carolina.
Shanghae	United Kingdom	The schooner was driven ashore in the Yangtze.
Theodore Stony	Confederate States of America	American Civil War, Union blockade: The 54-ton schooner, carrying a cargo of rice, was destroyed at Bulls Bay, by an armed boat from the barque USS Restless (United States Navy).
Wandoo	Flag unknown	American Civil War, Union blockade: The schooner, carrying a cargo of rice, was destroyed at Bulls Bay, by an armed boat from the barque USS Restless (United States Navy).
Two unidentified lighters	Confederate States of America	American Civil War: The lighters were scuttled as blockships in the channel abreast of Fort Caswell, North Carolina, by Confederate forces.
Unidentified schooner	Confederate States of America	American Civil War: Captured near Elizabeth City, by the sidewheel gunboat USS Delaware (United States Navy) on 10 February, the schooner was scuttled as a blockship at the mouth of the Albemarle and Chesapeake Canal.
Unidentified schooner	Confederate States of America	American Civil War: Captured while carrying a cargo of furniture near Elizabeth City, by the sidewheel gunboat USS Delaware (United States Navy) on 10 February, the schooner was scuttled as a blockship at the mouth of the Albemarle and Chesapeake Canal.

== 15 February ==
List of shipwrecks: 15 February 1862
Ship	State	Description
Acachan	United Kingdom	The steamship was wrecked on the coast of Brazil with the loss of three of her crew. She was on a voyage from Lisbon, Portugal to the Rio Grande do Sol.
Bastille	France	The ship sprang a leak and foundered 7 nautical miles (13 km) off Falmouth, Cornwall, United Kingdom. Her crew were rescued by Aline (France). Bastille was on a voyage from Nantes, Loire-Inférieure to Cardiff, Glamorgan, United Kingdom.
Camoens	Portugal	The ship was driven ashore at Gibraltar. She was on a voyage from Porto to Agrigento, Sicily, Italy.

== 16 February ==
List of shipwrecks: 16 February 1862
Ship	State	Description
Alexander II	Russia	The steamship caught fire at Reval.
Blakeley	United Kingdom	The barque was abandoned in the Atlantic Ocean (44°25′N 11°26′W). Her crew were rescued by Clemence (France). Blakeley was on a voyage from Newcastle upon Tyne, Northumberland to Cartagena, Spain.
Hinda	Portugal	The ship was wrecked at Sines.
Ravensdale	United Kingdom	The ship was driven ashore at Gibraltar. She was refloated and resumed her voyage.
Spartan	United Kingdom	The steamship was abandoned in a sinking condition. All on board were subsequently rescued by William Fotheringham (United Kingdom). Spartan was on her maiden voyage, from Deptford, Kent to Halifax, Nova Scotia, British North America.

== 17 February ==
List of shipwrecks: 17 February 1862
Ship	State	Description
Competitor	United Kingdom	The barque caught fire, exploded and sank in the Atlantic Ocean with the loss of four of her crew. She was on a voyage from Cardiff, Glamorgan to Cádiz, Spain.
Mary Younge	United Kingdom	The ship sprang a leak and sank off Groomsport, County Down. Her crew were rescued. She was on a voyage from Ardrossan, Ayrshire to Cardiff.
Progress	United Kingdom	The ship collided with Mabel (United Kingdom) off Flamborough Head, Yorkshire and was abandoned by her crew. She was on a voyage from Newcastle upon Tyne, Northumberland to London. Mabel subsequently put a skeleton crew on board Progress. They took her in to Bridlington, Yorkshire.

== 18 February ==
List of shipwrecks: 18 February 1862
Ship	State	Description
Arabella	United Kingdom	The ship was damaged by fire at Wellington, New Zealand.
Asworth Trumball	United States	The ship departed from New York for Queenstown, County Cork, United Kingdom. No furthert trace, presumed foundered with the loss of all hands.
Calliope	United Kingdom	The ship ran aground on the Long Rock, in the Irish Sea off the coast of County Down. She was on a voyage from Troon, Ayrshire to Genoa, Italy.
Elizabeth	United Kingdom	The ship was wrecked in the River Spey. Her crew were rescued. She was on a voyage from South Shields, County Durham to Great Yarmouth, Norfolk.
Johanna	United Kingdom	The ship foundered in the Bristol Channel off Lundy Island, Devon Her crew survived. She was on a voyage from Newport, Monmouthshire to Porto, Portugal.
Kate	United Kingdom	The schooner ran aground on the Sunk Sand, in the North Sea off the coast of Essex. She was on a voyage from Calais, France to South Shields, County Durham. She was refloated with the assistance of two smacks and resumed her voyage.
Primero	United States	The 331-ton screw steamer was lost in the North Atlantic Ocean during a voyage from Port Royal, South Carolina, South Carolina, Confederate States of America to New York.
Progress	United Kingdom	The collier collided with the collier Mabel in the North Sea and was abandoned by her crew. She was on a voyage from Newcastle upon Tyne, Northumberland to London. Progress was taken in to Bridlington, Yorkshire in a derelict condition by some of the crew of Mabel.
Seine	France	The brig was wrecked on the Skerweather Sands, in the Bristol Channel off the coast of Glamorgan, United Kingdom. Her crew were rescued. She was on a voyage from Grouville, Jersey, Channel Islands to Swansea, Glamorgan.
Usworth	United Kingdom	The ship departed from New York for Queenstown. No further trace, presumed foundered with the loss of all hands.

== 19 February ==
List of shipwrecks: 19 February 1862
Ship	State	Description
Adelina	United Kingdom	The ship was wrecked at North Sunderland, County Durham. She was on a voyage from London to Leith, Lothian.
Eliza Charles	United Kingdom	The ship departed from New York, United States for Gloucester. No further trace, presumed found with the loss of all hands.

== 20 February ==
List of shipwrecks: 20 February 1862
Ship	State	Description
Achilles	Spain	The brig was wrecked on the coast of Portugal.
Carrs	United Kingdom	The ship was abandoned in the Atlantic Ocean. Her crew were rescued by Grand Turk (United Kingdom. Carrs was on a voyage from North Shields, Northumberland to Cádiz, Spain.
Elizabeth Ann	(United Kingdom of Great Britain and Ireland) Jersey	The ship was wrecked on the Haisborough Sands, in the North Sea off the coast of Norfolk. She was on a voyage from Burriana, Spain to Hull, Yorkshire.
Giovanni G.	Austrian Empire	The brig was wrecked near Ribeirinha Point, Flores Island, Azores. Her crew were rescued. She was on a voyage from New York, United States to Queenstown, County Cork, United Kingdom.
USS Isaac N. Seymour	United States Navy	American Civil War, Union blockade: The paddle steamer struck an abandoned anchor and sank in Hatteras Inlet off North Carolina, Confederate States of America. She was refloated, repaired, and returned to service.
Juddah Tonso	United States	The ship was abandoned in the Atlantic Ocean. Her crew were rescued by Byzantium (United Kingdom). Juddah Tonso was on a voyage from Liverpool, Lancashire, United Kingdom to Philadelphia, Pennsylvania.
Mary Nevis	United States	American Civil War: The sloop was stripped and burned by United States Navy forces after she ran aground and bilged at Bayes Pass, Florida, Confederate States of America.
Portia	United Kingdom	The ship ran aground on the Blackwater Bank, in the Irish Sea with the loss of nine of her thirteen crew. She was on a voyage from Liverpool, Lancashire to Pernambuco, Brazil. She was taken in to Dublin in a derelict condition.
Sulina	United Kingdom	The brig was abandoned in the Atlantic Ocean. Her crew were rescued by the brig Athlete (Kingdom of Hanover). Sulina was on a voyage from Liverpool to Veracruz, Mexico. Sulina was subsequently discovered derelict by the barque Czarina ( (United Kingdom of Great Britain and Ireland) British North America). four crew were put aboard and she was taken in to Kinsale, County Cork.

== 21 February ==
List of shipwrecks: 21 February 1862
Ship	State	Description
Elizabeth and Hannah	United Kingdom	The schooner ran aground and sank on the Gaa Sands, off the mouth of the River Tay. Her six crew were rescued by the Buddon Ness Lifeboat. She was on a voyage from London to Newburgh, Fife.
Giaour	United Kingdom	The brig struck a sunken rock off Lemnos, Greece and was wrecked. Her ten crew survived. She was on a voyage from Constantinople, Ottoman Empire to Salonica, Greece.
Mary Ellen	United Kingdom	The brig was abandoned at sea in a sinking condition.
Paragon	United Kingdom	The ship was destroyed by fire at Plymouth, Devon. She was on a voyage from Plymouth Dockyard to Deptford Dockyard, Kent.
Restless	United Kingdom	The tug was wrecked on Horse Isle, in the Firth of Clyde. She was on a voyage from Greenock, Renfrewshire to Ardrossan, Ayrshire.
Silistria	(United Kingdom of Great Britain and Ireland) British North America	The full-rigged ship was abandoned in the Atlantic Ocean (39°59′N 24°40′W). Her crew were rescued by Agnes (United Kingdom). Silistria was on a voyage from New York, United States to Liverpool, Lancashire.
Success	United Kingdom	The barque was wrecked at Ventry, County Kerry with the loss of nine of her eleven crew. She was on a voyage from Demerara, British Guiana to Liverpool, Lancashire.
W. H. Wolfe	United Kingdom	The ship was abandoned in the Atlantic Ocean. Her crew were rescued. She was on a voyage from Newport, Monmouthshire to Porto, Portugal.

== 22 February ==
List of shipwrecks: 22 February 1862
Ship	State	Description
Beatin	Hamburg	The barque was abandoned in the Atlantic Ocean. Her crew were rescued by Solent (United Kingdom). She was on a voyage from Savanilla, Granadine Confederation to Hamburg.
Ben Cushing	United States	The Brig ran ground on French Reef, Florida and was wrecked.
HMS Defence	Royal Navy	The Defence-class ironclad collided with HMS Fenella (Royal Navy) off Spithead, Hampshire. Her anchor was driven through her bows below the waterline and she ran aground. She was refloated and taken in to Portsmouth, Hampshire for repairs.
Isabella	United Kingdom	The brig ran ashore at Flamborough Head, Yorkshire. She was on a voyage from Dieppe, Seine-Inférieure, France to Hartlepool, County Durham. She was consequently condemned.
Metcalfe	United Kingdom	The Yorkshire Billyboy was driven ashore and severely damaged at Bridlington, Yorkshire. She was on a voyage from Stockton-on-Tees to Sunderland, County Durham. She was consequently condemned.
Speedwell	United Kingdom	The ship was driven ashore at Aberdeen. Her crew were rescued. She was on a voyage from Aberdeen to South Shields, County Durham.
Squando, and Warbler	United States	The ships were damaged when Charlotte. A. Stamter (United States) drove into them at Faial Island, Azores. They were both abandoned on 24 February, but were reboarded the next day. Both vessels were on a voyage from New York to Liverpool, Lancashire, United Kingdom. Warbler was t

== 23 February ==
List of shipwrecks: 23 February 1862
Ship	State	Description
Boscawen	United Kingdom	The school ship ran aground at Southampton, Hampshire.
Cambridge	Confederate States of America	The 242-ton sternwheel paddle steamer struck a snag and sank in the White River at Grand Glaise, Arkansas, with the loss of 42 lives.
CSS James Johnson	Confederate States Navy	American Civil War: The 525-ton sidewheel paddle steamer was undergoing conversion into a gunboat on the Cumberland River at Nashville, Tennessee, when she was burned to prevent her capture by Union forces.
CSS James Woods	Confederate States Navy	American Civil War: The 585-ton sidewheel paddle steamer was undergoing conversion into a gunboat on the [Cumberland River at Nashville, when she was burned to prevent her capture by Union forces.
Kitty Cordes	United States	The ship was abandoned in the Atlantic Ocean 250 nautical miles (460 km) north west of Faial Island, Azores. Her sixteen crew were rescued by the steamship Annie Childs (Confederate States of America). Kitty Cordes was on a voyage from Cardiff, Glamorgan, United Kingdom to Halifax, Nova Scotia, British North America.
Klei Old Ambt	Netherlands	The schooner was driven ashore at New Romney, Kent, United Kingdom. She was on a voyage from Antwerp, Belgium to "Gallas".
W. R. Gasfabach	Netherlands	The brig was wrecked at Whitby, Yorkshire, United Kingdom. Her crew were rescued. She was on a voyage from South Shields, County Durham, United Kingdom to Rotterdam, South Holland.

== 24 February ==
List of shipwrecks: 24 February 1862
Ship	State	Description
Ann Heaton	United Kingdom	The ship was driven ashore and wrecked at Point Lynas, Anglesey. She was on a voyage from Liverpool, Lancashire to Havana, Cuba.
Aurora	Portugal	The brig foundered off Cedeira, Spain. Her crew reached land in the longboat. She was on a voyage from Newport, Monmouthshire, United Kingdom to Lisbon.
China	(United Kingdom of Great Britain and Ireland) British North America	The full-rigged ship ran aground on the Kish Bank, in the Irish Sea. Her crew were rescued by a pilot cutter. She was on a voyage from Liverpool to Halifax, Nova Scotia. China was refloated and taken in to Kingstown, County Dublin in a waterlogged condition.
Defiance	(United Kingdom of Great Britain and Ireland) British North America	The ship was driven ashore at "Dulwich", County Mayo.
Deptford	United Kingdom	The barque collided with another vessel and foundered in the Atlantic Ocean 700 nautical miles (1,300 km) south west of Land's End, Cornwall. Her crew were rescued by Garrawalt (United Kingdom). Deptford was on a voyage from Liverpool, Lancashire to Malta.
Fleurian de Bellevue	France	The ship was abandoned in the Atlantic Ocean .Her crew were rescued by the brigantine Example (United Kingdom). Fleurian de Ballevue was on a voyage from Cap-Haïtien, Haiti to Havre de Grâce, Seine-Inférieure.
Johanne	Bremen	The barque was wrecked on the Longsand, in the North Sea off the coast of Essex, United Kingdom with the loss of twelve of her thirteen crew. The survivor was rescued by the smack Alfred (United Kingdom). Johann was on a voyage from Bremen to Cardiff, Glamorgan, United Kingdom.
Mary E. Dunworth	United States	The barque was wrecked on Faial Island, Azores. Her crew were rescued.
Matilda	Sweden	The brig was wrecked on the Corton Sands, in the North Sea off the coast of Suffolk, United Kingdom with the loss of two of her eight crew. Three crew reached shore in the longboat. Three survivors were rescued by the Lowestoft Lifeboat. She was on a voyage from Marseille, Bouches-du-Rhône, France to Great Yarmouth, Norfolk, United Kingdom.
Morning Light	(United Kingdom of Great Britain and Ireland) British North America	The barque was driven ashore and wrecked on São Jorge Island, Azores. She was on a voyage from New York, United States to Dundalk, County Louth.
Neptune	United Kingdom	The barque was abandoned in the Atlantic Ocean. Her crew were rescued by Jane Dowell (United States). Neptune was on a voyage from New York to Falmouth, Cornwall.
New Brunswick	United Kingdom	The ship was driven ashore and wrecked on Cape Clear Island, County Cork. Her crew were rescued. She was on a voyage from Liverpool to Calcutta, India.
Rimac	United Kingdom	The ship was driven ashore at "Kildadan", County Clare.
Santa Cruz	United States	The 96-ton screw steamer was lost in the Yangtze River below Sterling Island.

== 25 February ==
List of shipwrecks: 25 February 1862
Ship	State	Description
Jessie	United Kingdom	The barque was wrecked on Martin's Reef, off the coast of Nova Scotia, British North America. She was on a voyage from Puerto Rica to Halifax, Nova Scotia.
Minna	Grand Duchy of Oldenburg	The schooner was abandoned in the Atlantic Ocean. Four crew were rescued by Capriciosa (Flag unknown), the rest by an American ship.
Niagara	United States	The ship foundered in the Atlantic Ocean. Her crew were taken off the wreck the next day by the brig Maine (United States). Niagara was on a voyage from Philadelphia, Pennsylvania to Liverpool, Lancashire, United Kingdom.
Oporto	United Kingdom	The schooner was driven ashore in Blacksod Bay. She was on a voyage from Ardrossan, Ayrshire to Galway.
USS R. B. Forbes	United States Navy	American Civil War: The armed screw steamer was driven ashore on the Currituck Banks on the coast of North Carolina, Confederate States of America about four miles (6.4 km) south of Currituck Inlet in a gale. After the armed screw steamer USS Young America (United States Navy) took off her crew, R. B. Forbes was burned to prevent her capture by Confederate forces.

== 26 February ==
List of shipwrecks: 26 February 1862
Ship	State	Description
Alliance	United Kingdom	The schooner was wrecked at Peterhead, Aberdeenshire. Her crew survived. She was on a voyage from Peterhead to Sunderland, County Durham.
Edith	United Kingdom	The schooner ran aground on the Sparrow Hawk Sand, in the North Sea off the coast of County Durham. She was on a voyage from Liverpool, Lancashire to South Shields, County Durham. She was refloated with the assistance of a tug.
Haswell	United Kingdom	The steamship ran aground and was damaged at Sunderland.
Lord Byron	United Kingdom	The steamship was wrecked on the Île de Sein, Finistère, France. Her nine crew were rescued. She was on a voyage from Cardiff, Glamorgan to Bordeaux, Gironde, France.
Mary	United Kingdom	The ship foundered off Cape Finisterre, Spain. Her crew survived.
Minnetonka	United States	American Civil War: The 158-ton sternwheel paddle steamer was captured and burned on the Cumberland River at Nashville, Tennessee by Confederate States Army forces.
Newbottle	United Kingdom	The brig was driven ashore at Lowestoft, Suffolk. She was on a voyage from South Shields, County Durham to Lisbon, Portugal. She was refloated the next day and taken in to Lowestoft in a leaky condition. Subsequently repaired.
Robert Gilfillan	United States	American Civil War: The schooner, carrying a cargo of assorted provisions from Philadelphia, Pennsylvania, to Santo Domingo or Haiti (sources differ), was captured and burned in the North Atlantic Ocean by the merchant raider CSS Nashville (Confederate States Navy).
Sisters	United Kingdom	The brig ran aground on the Patch Rock and sank. Her nine crew were rescued by the Caistor Lifeboat. She was on a voyage from Hartlepool, County Durham to London and/or Rochester, Kent.
Trojan	United Kingdom	The ship was abandoned in the Atlantic Ocean. She was on a voyage from Demerara, British Guiana to the Clyde.

== 27 February ==
List of shipwrecks: 27 February 1862
Ship	State	Description
Billow	United Kingdom	The ship was abandoned in the Atlantic Ocean. Her crew were rescued by Constantine (United Kingdom).
Charlotte A. Stamter	United Kingdom	The ship, which had been damaged on 22 February by collision with Squando and Warbler (both United States) was discovered to be sinking at Faial Island, Azores due to auger holes having been bored in her bottom. The holes were stopped and she was saved.
Dettmar	Bremen	The brig was abandoned at sea. Her crew were rescued by the full-rigged ship Malacka (United States).
Hope	United Kingdom	The barque was abandoned in the Atlantic Ocean. Her crew were rescued by Commodore (United Kingdom). Hope was on a voyage from New York, United States to Fleetwood, Lancashire.
Lord Byron	United Kingdom	The ship was wrecked on the Île de Sein, Finistère France. Nine crew were rescued. She was on a voyage from Cardiff, Glamorgan to Brest, Finistère.
Mathilde	France	The ship was wrecked on the Corton Sands, in the North Sea off the coast of Suffolk, United Kingdom. She was on a voyage from Marseille, Bouches-du-Rhône to Great Yarmouth, Norfolk, United Kingdom.
CSS Prince	Confederate States Navy	The 223-ton sidewheel transport struck a snag and sank in the Mississippi River near Island Number Ten and Hickman, Kentucky, with the loss of 74 lives.
Sisters	United Kingdom	The collier, a brig, was wrecked on the Barber Sands, in the North Sea off the coast of Norfolk. Her nine crew were rescued by the Caistor Lifeboat. She was on a voyage from Hartlepool, County Durham to Rochester, Kent.

== 28 February ==
List of shipwrecks: 28 February 1862
Ship	State	Description
Banff, and London	United Kingdom	The brigantine Banff and the schooner London collided in the North Sea off the coast of Yorkshire. The crew of London got aboard Banff, but that vessel was thought to be in a sinking condition and was abandoned by all on board. They were rescued by Cynthia Ann (United Kingdom). Banff was on a voyage from Sunderland, County Durham to Harwich, Essex. She was discovered derelict on 2 February by the Redcar Lifeboat and was towed in to Hartlepool, County Durham by a steamship. London was on a voyage from Sunderland to Dymchurch, Kent.
Conqueror	United Kingdom	The ship foundered in the North Sea off the Newarp Lightship ( Trinity House).
Elizabeth Searle	United Kingdom	The schooner ran aground and sank in the River Spey. Her crew were rescued. She was on a voyage from South Shields, County Durham to Great Yarmouth, Norfolk.
Kesia	United Kingdom	The ship was abandoned in the Atlantic Ocean. Her crew were rescued by Wellington (United Kingdom). Kesia was on a voyage from Middlesbrough, Yorkshire to Cuba.
Martlet	United Kingdom	The ship capsized at Sunderland. She was righted.
Northern Chief	United Kingdom	The ship was abandoned in the Atlantic Ocean. Her crew were rescued by Mealon (United Kingdom). Northern Chief was on a voyage from New York, United States to Liverpool, Lancashire.
William Darley	United Kingdom	The barque foundered in the Atlantic Ocean. Her crew were rescued by Aid (United Kingdom). William Darley was on a voyage from Moulmein, Burma to Falmouth, Cornwall.

== Unknown date ==
List of shipwrecks: Unknown date in February 1862
Ship	State	Description
Alice Smith	United Kingdom	The ship was lost at the Cape of Good Hope, Cape Colony.
Almirante do Tago	Portugal	The ship was lost in the Tagus.
Anglo Saxon	United States	The fishing schooner sailed from Gloucester, Massachusetts on the 20th and vanished, probably sank in a gale on the Georges Bank on the 24/25th. Lost with all 10 crew.
Annie Buckman	United Kingdom	The ship was abandoned in the Atlantic Ocean before 12 February. She was on a voyage from Cardiff, Glamorgan to Shanghai, China.
Annie Laurie	United States	The fishing schooner left Gloucester, Massachusetts 18 February and vanished, possibly lost in a gale on the 24/25th on the Georges Bank. All 9 crew were killed.
Autocrat	United States	The full-rigged ship was driven ashore before 27 February. She was on a voyage from Boston, Massachusetts to Liverpool, Lancashire, United Kingdom. She was refloated and put back to Boston.
C. A. Nicholas	Confederate States of America	American Civil War, Battle of Roanoke Island: Converted into a makeshift fort by Confederate forces after running aground on Roanoke Island in Croatan Sound in North Carolina, the barge was destroyed by the gunboat USS Southfield (United States Navy).
Clara Eva	United States	The fishing schooner left Gloucester, Massachusetts 20 February and vanished, possibly lost in a gale on the 24/25th on the Georges Bank. All 9 crew were killed.
Contest	United States	The fishing schooner left Gloucester, Massachusetts 11 February and vanished, possibly lost in a gale on the 24/25th on the Georges Bank. All 9 crew were killed.
CSS Dunbar	Confederate States Navy	American Civil War: The 213-ton sidewheel paddle steamer was sunk in Cypress Creek off the Tennessee River about two miles (3.2 km) below Florence, Alabama, to prevent her capture by Union forces. Her wreck was burned on 21 April by the sidewheel paddle steamer USS Tyler (United States Navy). She was later refloated by the Union Army.
Dreadnaught	United States	The fishing schooner left Gloucester, Massachusetts 18 February and vanished, possibly lost in a gale on the 24/25th. Lost with all 9 crew.
Ebenezer	United Kingdom	The ship ran aground on the Herd Sand, in the North Sea off the coast of County Durham. She was refloated on 8 February and towed in to Sunderland, County Durham.
Eliza	United Kingdom	The ship was lost near Nuevitas, Cuba. She was on a voyage from Liverpool to Havana, Cuba.
Eliza Laing	United Kingdom	The ship was abandoned in the Atlantic Ocean. She was on a voyage from New York, United States to Queenstown, County Cork.
Ella	United States	The ship was driven ashore near Newport, Rhode Island. She was on a voyage from New York to Livorno, Italy.
Enterprise	United States	The fishing schooner left Gloucester, Massachusetts on 23 February and vanished, probably lost in a gale on the 24/25th. Lost with all 9 crew.
Friggia	Denmark	The ship was wrecked in Table Bay. She was on a voyage from Copenhagen to Singapore, Straits Settlements.
George F. Wonson	United States	The fishing schooner probably sank in a terrible gale on the Georges Bank on the 24/25th after leaving Gloucester, Massachusetts on the 21st. Lost with all 9 crew.
Harriet Haseltine	United States	The ship sprang a leak and foundered in the Atlantic Ocean off Madeira on or before 2 February. Her crew survived. She was on a voyage from New York to Falmouth, Cornwall, United Kingdom.
Hazard	United Kingdom	The ship foundered. She was on a voyage from Livorno to Hamburg.
Isabella Dorothy	United Kingdom	The ship was wrecked on Cyprus.
John J. Crittenden	United States	The fishing schooner left Gloucester, Massachusetts 22 February and vanished, possibly lost in a gale on the 24/25th on the Georges Bank. Lost with all 10 hands.
Lady Flora Hastings	United Kingdom	The ship was abandoned in the Indian Ocean. She was on a voyage from Moulmein, Burma to a British port.
Lanchester	United Kingdom	The ship foundered before 22 February. Her crew were rescued. She was on a voyage from Newcastle upon Tyne, Northumberland to Matanzas, Cuba.
Liberty	(United Kingdom of Great Britain and Ireland) Jersey	The ship was driven ashore and wrecked at Redcar, Yorkshire.
Malacca	Hamburg	The ship was wrecked on the Pratas Shoal. Her crew were rescued by the barque Susannah (Hamburg). Malacca was on a voyage from Foo Chow Foo, China to New York.
Marie Hortense	France	The ship foundered in the North Sea off the coast of Norfolk, United Kingdom.
May Queen	United States	The fishing schooner left Gloucester, Massachusetts 17 February and vanished, possibly lost in a gale on the 24/25th on the Georges Bank. All 11 crew were killed.
Nebraska	United States	The fishing schooner left Gloucester, Massachusetts on 10 February and vanished, probably lost in a gale on the 24/25th. Lost with all 9 crewmen.
North Star	United States	The fishing schooner left Gloucester, Massachusetts 10 February and vanished, possibly lost in a gale on the 24/25th on the Georges Bank. All 9 crew were killed.
Ocean Flower	United States	The fishing schooner left Gloucester, Massachusetts 15 February and vanished, possibly lost in a gale on the 24/25th on the Georges Bank. All 9 crew were killed.
Oconomowoc	United States	The fishing schooner left Gloucester, Massachusetts 10 February and vanished, possibly lost in a gale on the 24/25th on the Georges Bank. All 10 crew were killed.
O.K.	United States	American Civil War, Union blockade: Captured from the Confederates by the sidewheel paddle steamer USS Santiago de Cuba (United States Navy) at Cedar Key, Florida, on 8 February, the sloop was swamped in the Gulf of Mexico while on her way to join the United States Navy blockading force off St. Marks, Florida.
Robert Pennell	United Kingdom	The ship was wrecked on Faial Island, Azores before 24 February.
Rosebud	United Kingdom	The ship foundered in the North Sea before 25 January.
San Nicolo	Trieste	The ship was wrecked in the Black Sea before 7 February.
Sarah Fleming	United Kingdom	The ship was abandoned at sea. She was on a voyage from Quebec City, Province of Canada, British North America to Teignmouth, Devon.
Scandia	Flag unknown	The ship was wrecked at Barnegat, New Jersey, United States before 4 February. She was on a voyage from New York to Queenstown.
Science No. 2	United States	The 116-ton sternwheel paddle steamer sank up to her boiler deck in the Ohio River at Pomeroy, Ohio.
Sonora	United Kingdom	The brigantine was lost in Placentia Bay before 6 February. She was on a voyage from New York to Saint John's, Newfoundland, British North America.
Susannah	Hamburg	The barque was wrecked on Bintang Poin, China. She was on a voyage from Foo Chow Foo, China to Falmouth.
Tolo	Unknown	The full-rigged ship was lost at San Juan Island on the coast of Washington Territory.
Winteren	Flag unknown	The ship was wrecked at Barnegat before 4 February. She was on a voyage from New York to Queenstown.
Woodside	United Kingdom	The ship was wrecked on the Longbourne Sands in Carnarvon Bay.
Unidentified barge	Confederate States of America	American Civil War: Grounded in Croatan Sound on Roanoke Island, filled with sand, and armed to serve as a makeshift fort, the barge was destroyed by the gunboat USS Southfield (United States Navy).
Unnamed	Greece	The ship was wrecked at "Amastra" before 7 February.
