= List of shipwrecks in March 1862 =

The list of shipwrecks in March 1862 includes ships sunk, foundered, grounded, or otherwise lost during March 1862.

== 1 March ==
List of shipwrecks: 1 March 1862
Ship	State	Description
Alice	United Kingdom	The brigantine was wrecked at Halifax, Nova Scotia, British North America.
David Lyon	United Kingdom	The ship was wrecked at Havana, Cuba, or Savannah-la-Mar, Jamaica.
Janet Willis	United Kingdom	The ship departed from Calcutta, India for Hamburg. No further trace, presumed foundered with the loss of all hands.
Marie	Prussia	The ship was holed by ice off the coast of Denmark. She was on a voyage from Hartlepool, County Durham, United Kingdom to Stettin. She was taken in to Helsingør, Denmark in a waterlogged condition.
Northern Chief	United States	The full-rigged ship was abandoned in the Atlantic Ocean. Her crew were rescued by the steamship Merlin (United Kingdom). Northern Chief was on a voyage from New York to Liverpool, Lancashire, United Kingdom.
Polynesia	United States	The 1,084-ton clipper went aground on South Beach in San Francisco Bay. Her crew then set her on fire.
Waterloo	United Kingdom	The ship was driven ashore at Gibraltar. She was on a voyage from Odesa to Queenstown, County Cork. She was later refloated.

== 2 March ==
List of shipwrecks: 2 March 1862
Ship	State	Description
Eliza Bowen	United Kingdom	The brig was driven ashore at Gibraltar.
Marie	United Kingdom	The ship was holed by ice and put in to Helsingør, Denmark in a waterlogged condition.
Victor	Belgium	The brig collided with Annawan (United Kingdom) and sank at Liverpool, Lancashire, United Kingdom. Her crew were rescued. Victor was on a voyage from Ostend, West Flanders to Liverpool. She had been refloated by 10 March and beached.
Wasdale	United Kingdom	The ship was wrecked at St. Bees Head, Cumberland. She was on a voyage from Dublin to Whitehaven, Cumberland.

== 3 March ==
List of shipwrecks: 3 March 1862
Ship	State	Description
Diana	United Kingdom	The flat was wrecked at Aberavon, Glamorgan.
John and Susannah	United Kingdom	The dandy ran aground near the Carr Rock, on the coast of County Durham and was damaged.
Polynesia	United States	The medium clipper caught fire at Hong Kong. Despite assistance from USS St. Mary's (United States Navy), she was a total loss.
Wilhelmine	Hamburg	The ship ran aground on the Meddun Sand, in the North Sea. She was on a voyage from Cuxhaven to an English port. She was refloated.
William Sprague	United Kingdom	The ship ran aground on the Meddun Sand. She was on a voyage from Cuxhaven to Swansea, Glamorgan. She was refloated and resumed her voyage.

== 4 March ==
List of shipwrecks: 4 March 1862
Ship	State	Description
Ada	United States	The brig collided with Bull ( (United Kingdom of Great Britain and Ireland) British North America) and foundered in the Atlantic Ocean. Her crew were rescued by Bull (United Kingdom). Ada was on a voyage from Valparaíso, Chile, to Cardiff, Glamorgan, United Kingdom.
Cort Adler	Norway	The schooner was run down and sunk off Cape Trafalgar, Spain by the steamship Milan (United Kingdom). Cort Adler was on a voyage from Grangemouth, Stirlingshire, United Kingdom to Málaga, Spain.
Elizabeth	United Kingdom	The schooner was driven ashore at Kingston on Spey, Forfarshire. Her crew were rescued. She was on a voyage from Sunderland, County Durham to Aberdeen to.
Emma Eliza, and Foam	(United Kingdom of Great Britain and Ireland) New Zealand	The schooner Emma Eliza and cutter Foam were both dashed against Auckland wharf and overwhelmed by water during a heavy gale. Several other vessels moored nearby also sustained heavy damage.
Lady Suffolk	United States	The ship was abandoned in the Atlantic Ocean. All on board were rescued by Mary Anne (United States). Lady Suffolk was on a voyage from Boston, Massachusetts to Port-au-Prince, Haiti.
Lessing	Grand Duchy of Mecklenburg-Schwerin	The brig was wrecked 4 nautical miles (7.4 km) south of Cape Spartel, Morocco with the loss of seven of her ten crew. She was on a voyage from Newcastle upon Tyne, Northumberland, United Kingdom to Constantinople, Ottoman Empire.
Windermere	United Kingdom	The barque ran aground on the Galloper Sand. She floated off but consequently sank. Her crew took to the longboat; they were rescued by the schooner Nancy Dawson (United Kingdom). Windermere was on a voyage from Sunderland, County Durham to Bordeaux, Gironde, France.

== 5 March ==
List of shipwrecks: 5 March 1862
Ship	State	Description
Cantabria	Belgium	The steamship was beached on La Gomera, Canary Islands. She was on a voyage from Cádiz, Spain to Havana, Cuba.
Contest	United Kingdom	The brig was driven in to Jane (United Kingdom) and was abandoned at São Miguel Island, Azores. She subsequently drove ashore and was wrecked. Her crew perished when their boats capsized.
Good Intent	United Kingdom	The brigantine ran aground on the Mizen Reef, in the English Channel. She was refloated but drove ashore at Selsey Bill, Sussex in a waterlogged condition. Her crew were rescued. She was on a voyage from Bridport, Dorset to Newcastle upon Tyne, Northumberland.
Highland Chief	United Kingdom	The schooner was driven ashore and wrecked at Cairnbulg, Aberdeenshire. Her crew reached shore in a boat, her captain was rescued by a fishing boat. She was on a voyage from Nairn to Newcastle upon Tyne.
Hope	United Kingdom	The ship was wrecked at Barry Island, Glamorgan. Her crew were rescued.
Jane	United Kingdom	The brig ran aground in the North Sea 3 nautical miles (5.6 km) off Sea Palling, Norfolk. Eight of her ten crew were rescued by the Palling Lifeboat. She was taken into a safe port the next day.
Jane	United Kingdom	The schooner was abandoned in the English Channel off St Alban's Head, Dorset. Her crew were rescued by the schooner Walter Scott (United Kingdom) before she sank.
John and George	United Kingdom	The Yorkshire Billyboy was driven ashore and wrecked at Thorpeness, Suffolk. She was on a voyage from Sunderland, County Durham to Maidstone, Kent.
Levant	United Kingdom	The barque struck a sunken wreck and sank at Dungeness, Kent. Her crew were rescued by a pilot boat.
Mayflower	United Kingdom	The collier, a brig was run down and sunk in the River Thames by HMS Rapid (Royal Navy). She was refloated on 7 March but was sunk by the wash from a passing steamship. She was raised on 13 March.
Parana	(United Kingdom of Great Britain and Ireland) Jersey	The ketch was driven ashore at Salcombe, Devon. She was on a voyage from Teignmouth, Devon to Jersey.
Sophia	United Kingdom	The ship ran aground and sank at Saint Sampson, Guernsey, Channel Islands. She was on a voyage from Swansea, Glamorgan to Saint Sampson's. She was refloated and taken in to port, but consequently sank.
Star	United Kingdom	The smack struck the Carr Rocks and sank. Her crew were rescued. She was on a voyage from Milford Haven, Pembrokeshire to the Stack Rock.
Union	United Kingdom	The brig ran aground off Saltfleet, Lincolnshire and was abandoned. Her crew were rescued. She was on a voyage from London to Seaham, County Durham. She was refloated on 7 March and taken in to Grimsby, Lincolnshire.
Victoria & Albert	United Kingdom	The schooner foundered on the Mixon Shoal in the Bristol Channel with the loss of all hands.

== 6 March ==
List of shipwrecks: 6 March 1862
Ship	State	Description
Actor	Confederate States of America	American Civil War, Union blockade: The schooner was sunk in the Pamlico River in North Carolina by the gunboat USS Ceres (United States Navy). She later was refloated.
Adonis	United Kingdom	The brig ran aground on the Barnard Sand, in the North Sea off the coast of Suffolk, and sank with the loss of two of the ten people on board. Survivors were rescued by a yawl.
Alma	(United Kingdom of Great Britain and Ireland) Trinidad	The barque was abandoned in the Atlantic Ocean. Her crew were rescued by Pyramid (United States). Alma was on a voyage from Port Medway, Nova Scotia, British North America to Trinidad.
Amity	United Kingdom	The tug collided with the steamship Douglas (United Kingdom) and sank at Sunderland, County Durham. She was refloated on 9 March.
Daniel Wheeler	United Kingdom	The barque was driven ashore at Jury's Gap, Sussex. She was on a voyage from Havre de Grâce, Seine-Inférieure, France to Newcastle upon Tyne, Northumberland.
Eagle	United Kingdom	The ship was wrecked on the Cross Sand, in the North Sea off the coast of Norfolk with the loss of all hands. She was on a voyage from Exmouth, Devon to Middlesbrough, Yorkshire.
Emma Parks	United States	The full-rigged ship was driven ashore at The Needles, Isle of Wight, United Kingdom.
Esther	United Kingdom	The brig was driven ashore and wrecked on Heligoland. Her crew were rescued. She was on a voyage from Newcastle upon Tyne to Hamburg.
Grace	United Kingdom	The schooner was driven ashore and sank at Lowestoft, Suffolk. Her crew were rescued. Shew as on a voyage from Hartlepool, County Durham to London.
Grace Gibb	United Kingdom	The sloop was driven ashore and severely damaged in Loch Hourn.
Hebe	United Kingdom	The ship was driven ashore at the Landguard Fort, Felixtowe, Suffolk. She was refloated and assisted in to Harwich, Essex.
Joseph	(United Kingdom of Great Britain and Ireland) Guernsey	The brigantine was wrecked on the Black Tan Spit, off the north Kent coast. Her crew were rescued. She was on a voyage from Guernsey to London.
Lord Vernon	United Kingdom	The ship was driven ashore and wrecked at Walmer, Kent. Her three crew were rescued.
Poseidon	Duchy of Holstein	The ship was driven ashore and sank near Aalbeck, Denmark. She was on a voyage from Neustadt in Holstein to Newcastle upon Tyne.
Sarah Park	United States	The full-rigged ship was driven ashore and damaged at Hurst Castle, Hampshire, United Kingdom. She was on a voyage from Chatham, Kent to Cardiff, Glamorgan, United Kingdom. She was refloated on 14 March and towed in to Southampton, Hampshire by the tug Phœnix (United Kingdom).
Septimus	United Kingdom	The brig was abandoned in the North Sea. Her four crew were rescued by Richard Mount (United Kingdom).
Summer Cloud	United Kingdom	The ship caught fire at Adelaide, South Australia and was scuttled. She was on a voyage from Liverpool, Lancashire to Adelaide. She was refloated on 22 March.
William	United Kingdom	The Yorkshire Billyboy collided with the schooner Wells (United Kingdom) and sank in the Humber.

== 7 March ==
List of shipwrecks: 7 March 1862
Ship	State	Description
Douglas	United Kingdom	The steamship ran aground at Sunderland, County Durham.
Elizabeth Duncan	United Kingdom	The brig ran aground and was wrecked in the Sound of Sanda. She was on a voyage from the Clyde to Saint Kitts.
Esther	United Kingdom	The brig was driven ashore and wrecked on Heligoland. Her crew were rescued. She was on a voyage from Newcastle upon Tyne, Northumberland to Hamburg.
Eugene	United Kingdom	The barque was wrecked on the Redny Rocks, Bahamas. She was on a voyage from Belize City, British Honduras to London.
Nabob	United States	The clipper ran aground on the Camden Bank, off the coast of County Cork, United Kingdom. She was on a voyage from San Francisco, California to Queenstown, County Cork She was refloated and taken in to Queenstown in a severely leaky condition. Subsequently repaired and returned to service.
Queen Victoria	United Kingdom	The steamship was driven ashore and wrecked 95 nautical miles (176 km) west of Alexandria, Egypt. Her crew were rescued. She was on a voyage from Liverpool, Lancashire to Alexandria.

== 8 March ==
List of shipwrecks: 8 March 1862
Ship	State	Description
Active	Sweden	The schooner was driven ashore south west of "Tishtaine". She was on a voyage from Hartlepool, County Durham, United Kingdom to "Helleborg".
Atalanta	United Kingdom	The barque was driven ashore near Muros, Spain. She was on a voyage from Swansea, Glamorgan to Vigo, Spain. She had become a wreck by 18 March.
USS Congress	United States Navy	1887 illustration of USS Congress′s magazine exploding. American Civil War: Battle of Hampton Roads: The sailing frigate ran aground in Hampton Roads off Newport News, Virginia, Confederate States of America, while in combat with the casemate ironclad Virginia and five other ships (all Confederate States Navy). Set afire by gunfire from Virginia, her magazine exploded and she burned down to the waterline with the loss of 136 lives. Her hulk was raised in September 1865 and sold for demolition.
USS Cumberland	United States Navy	Wreck of USS Cumberland, 1862 watercolour. American Civil War, Battle of Hampton Roads: The sailing frigate was rammed and sunk by the casemate ironclad Virginia (Confederate States Navy) in Hampton Roads, with 121 killed.
Emelie	France	The brig was driven ashore at Bideford, Devon, United Kingdom. She was on a voyage from Nantes, Loire-Inférieure to Cardiff, Glamorgan.
Flying Scud	United States	The full-rigged ship ran aground and was holed by her anchor at Jersey, Channel Islands. She was on a voyage from New York to Jersey. She was repaired.
Ganymede	United Kingdom	The ship ran aground in the River Dee. She was on a voyage from Ipswich, Suffolk to Dumfries. She was refloated on 19 March and taken in to Glencaple, Dumfriesshire.
Gleam	United Kingdom	The schooner was wrecked on the Boulmer Rocks, on the coast of Northumberland. She was on a voyage from Newcastle upon Tyne, Northumberland to Newburgh, Fife.
Harmony	United Kingdom	The brig was driven ashore and wrecked near Harrington, Cumberland with the loss of all six crew. She was on a voyage from Harrington to an Irish port.
Jane	United Kingdom	The smack was driven ashore and wrecked at Hurst Castle, Hampshire. Her crew were rescued. She was on a voyage from Poole, Dorset to Ventnor, Isle of Wight.
Minnesota	United States Navy	American Civil War, Battle of Hampton Roads: The frigate ran aground in the Hampton Roads. She was refloated the next day with the assistance of the steamship S. R. Spaulding (United States) and several tugs.
Nabob	United States	The full-rigged ship ran aground on the Camden Bank, off the coast of County Cork. She was on a voyage from San Francisco, California to Queenstown, County Cork, United Kingdom. She was refloated with the assistance of some tugs and towed in to Queenstown.
Pendulum	United States Navy	The 215-ton sidewheel paddle steamer foundered in Hampton Roads. She may have been sunk during the Battle of Hampton Roads.
Star of the East	United Kingdom	The schooner was wrecked at Tacumshane, County Wexford. She was on a voyage from Santander, Spain to Liverpool, Lancashire.
Utah	United States	The ship was driven into the barque Adele (Hamburg) and the full-rigged ship Stephen Crowell (United States) by ice and sank at New York. She was on a voyage from San Juan del Sur, Nicaragua to New York.
Witch	United Kingdom	The schooner was driven ashore in the Cymryan Strait. Her crew were rescued. She was on a voyage from St. John's, Newfoundland, British North America to Bristol, Gloucestershire.

== 9 March ==
List of shipwrecks: 9 March 1862
Ship	State	Description
Crystal Palace	United Kingdom	The fishing boat foundered in the English Channel off the coast of Devon with the loss of all eight crew.
CSS George Page	Confederate States Navy	American Civil War: The gunboat, a 410-ton sidewheel paddle steamer, was burned by her crew on Quantico Creek in Virginia to prevent her capture by Union forces.
Gesina Gertruida	Netherlands	The brig foundered in the Bay of Biscay. Her crew were rescued by Bezer (United Kingdom). She was on a voyage from Maroni, Cyprus to a Channel port.
Hedwig and Thilda	Sweden	The ship ran aground on the Corton Sand, in the North Sea off the coast of Suffolk, United Kingdom and was abandoned by her crew. She was on a voyage from Marseille, Bouches-du-Rhône, France to Great Yarmouth, Norfolk.
Hyperion	United States	The barque was abandoned in the Atlantic Ocean. Her crew were rescued by Mohawk (United States). Hyperion was on a voyage from Cardiff to Bermuda and New York. Hyperion was subsequently taken in to Barbados.
Margaret	United Kingdom	The ship foundered in the Mediterranean Sea. Her crew were rescued by Laconia (United Kingdom). Margaret was on a voyage from Bristol, Gloucestershire to Alicante, Spain.
Ocean Monarch	United Kingdom	The ship sprang a leak and foundered in the Atlantic Ocean. Her crew took to four boats and were rescued - 22 of them in one boat were rescued on 11 March by the schooner Oliver H. Booth (United States). The rest were rescued by Jurgen Lorentzen (United States). Ocean Monarch was on a voyage from New York, United States to Liverpool, Lancashire.
Queen of the Teign	United Kingdom	The barque sank in the Bay of Biscay. Her crew were rescued by Bezer (United Kingdom). Queen of the Teign was on a voyage from Rangoon, Burma to a British port.
Sultan	United Kingdom	The full-rigged ship was abandoned in the Atlantic Ocean. All 21 people on board were rescued by T. B. Barteren (United States). Sultan was on a voyage from Arica, Peru to Liverpool.
Vigile	Austrian Empire	The brig was wrecked in Mothecombe Bay. Her crew were rescued. She was on a voyage from Newcastle upon Tyne, Northumberland, United Kingdom to Trieste.
Unidentified schooner	United States	American Civil War, Battle of Hampton Roads: The schooner was set afire at Hampton Roads, Virginia, during combat between the monitor USS Monitor (United States Navy) and the broadside ironclad CSS Virginia (Confederate States Navy).

== 10 March ==
List of shipwrecks: 10 March 1862
Ship	State	Description
Mentor	Prussia	The ship was wrecked at Pendeen, Cornwall, United Kingdom with the loss of two of her eleven crew. She was on a voyage from Newcastle upon Tyne, Northumberland, United Kingdom to Livorno, Italy.
Pioneer	United Kingdom	The steamship ran aground on the Silver Rocks. She was on a voyage from "Ardishay" to Inveraray, Argyllshire. She was refloated on 14 March and taken in to Greenock, Renfrewshire.
Swallow	United Kingdom	The schooner was wrecked at Ouessant, Finistère, France with the loss of at least four lives. She was on a voyage from Patras, Greece to London.
Typhoon	United Kingdom	The ship was abandoned off Cape Clear Island, County Cork. Her crew were rescued by Ann Woods (United Kingdom). Typhoon was on a voyage from Liverpool, Lancashire to Calcutta, India.
USS Whitehall	United States Navy	American Civil War: The sidewheel paddle steamer was destroyed by an accidental flash fire at the mouth of Hampton Roads off Old Point Comfort, Virginia, Confederate States of America.

== 11 March ==
List of shipwrecks: 11 March 1862
Ship	State	Description
Somander	United Kingdom	The ship was abandoned in the Atlantic Ocean. Her crew were rescued by Mercury (United States). Somander was on a voyage from New York, United States to Liverpool, Lancashire.

== 12 March ==
List of shipwrecks: 12 March 1862
Ship	State	Description
Davidsons	United Kingdom	The ship sank in the North Sea with the loss of her captain. Survivors were rescued by Dutch fishermen.
Surinam	United Kingdom	The ship ran aground on the Cross Sand, in the North Sea off the coast of Norfolk. She was on a voyage from Sunderland, County Durham to Martinique. She was refloated and taken in to Great Yarmouth, Norfolk in a leaky condition and subsequently put back to Sunderland.
Town of Preston	United Kingdom	The schooner was driven ashore at Tramore, County Waterford. Her crew were rescued. She was on a voyage from Newry, County Antrim to Donegal.

== 13 March ==
List of shipwrecks: 13 March 1862
Ship	State	Description
Deptford	United Kingdom	The steamship ran aground at Whitby, Yorkshire. She was on a voyage from Sunderland, County Durham to London. She was refloated and put back for Sunderland.
Hercules	Italy	The barque was wrecked on the Longsand, in the North Sea off the coast of Essex, United Kingdom. All on board were rescued. She was on a voyage from Hull, Yorkshire to Piraeus, Greece.
Jessy	United Kingdom	The ship ran aground on the Kentish Knock. She was on a voyage from Middlesbrough, Yorkshire to Saint-Valery-sur-Somme, Somme, France. She was refloated and taken in to Ramsgate, Kent in a leaky condition.
Merovee	France	The brig was wrecked on the Kentish Knock. She was on a voyage from Blyth, Northumberland, United Kingdom to Caen, Calvados.
Venus	Hamburg	The galiot was driven ashore near "Nurastjert", Denmark. She was on a voyage from Newcastle upon Tyne, Northumberland to the Ise Fjord. She was refloated.

== 14 March ==
List of shipwrecks: 14 March 1862
Ship	State	Description
Breeze	United Kingdom	The ship ran aground on the Goodwin Sands, Kent. She was on a voyage from Bo'ness, Lothian to Dieppe, Seine-Inférieure, France. She was refloated and put in to Dover, Kent in a leaky condition.
Caroline Virginia	Confederate States of America	American Civil War, Battle of New Bern: The schooner was wrecked off New Bern, North Carolina.
Chatham	Confederate States of America	American Civil War, Battle of New Bern: The 57-ton sidewheel paddle steamer was burned at New Bern, to prevent her capture by Union forces.
Deptford	United Kingdom	The steamship was driven ashore at Staithes, Yorkshire and was abandoned by her crew. She may have subsequently floated off and came ashore near Redcar, Yorkshire, where she was recorded to have sunk by 14 May.
Emeline	France	The schooner was wrecked on the Kentish Knock. Her crew were rescued. She was on a voyage from Blyth, Northumberland, United Kingdom to Caen, Calvados.
Juntje Bess	Netherlands	The galiot ran aground on the Kingsgate Rock, on the Kent coast. She was on a voyage from Sunderland, County Durham, United Kingdom to Seville, Spain. She was refloated and taken in to Margate, Kent in a leaky condition.
Louisa	United Kingdom	The schooner struck the Runnel Stone and was beached at Porthcurno, Cornwall in a waterlogged condition. Her crew were rescued. She was on a voyage from Newport, Monmouthshire to Plymouth, Devon. She was refloated on 22 March and towed in to Penzance, Cornwall.
President	United Kingdom	The brig sank. Her crew were rescued. She was on a voyage from North Shields, Northumberland to Lisbon, Portugal.
Santo Druze	Flag unknown	The ship was destroyed by fire at Hong Kong. She was on a voyage from Shanghai to Hangkow.
Unidentified steamer	Confederate States of America	American Civil War, Battle of New Bern: Confederate forces scuttled the steamer at New Bern to prevent her capture by Union forces.

== 15 March ==
List of shipwrecks: 15 March 1862
Ship	State	Description
Ahti, and Negotiator	Russia; United Kingdom	The brig Ahti and the barque Negotiator collided in the Atlantic Ocean 70 nautical miles (130 km) south of the Isles of Scilly (49°20′N 6°12′W). Both vessels foundered with the loss of the mate of Ahti. Survivors were rescued by the barque Talavera (United Kingdom). Ahti which was on a voyage from Liverpool, Lancashire to Reval. Negotiator was on a voyage from Sunderland, County Durham to Genoa, Italy.
C. Vanderbilt	United Kingdom	American Civil War, Union blockade: During a blockade-running voyage from Havana, Cuba, to New Orleans, Louisiana, Confederate States of America, the 346-bulk-ton sidewheel paddle steamer foundered in the Gulf of Mexico. The schooner USS Maria A. Wood (United States Navy) later found 17 survivors with one of C. Vanderbilt′s lifeboats that had been beached near Pensacola, Florida, Confederate States of America. Another Lifeboat with 14 survivors, including her Master and two women, also made it to Florida.
Enos	United Kingdom	The barque was wrecked on the Goodwin Sands, Kent and was abandoned by her crew. She was on a voyage from Sunderland to Lisbon, Portugal. She was boarded by the crews of two luggers, pumped dry at towed in to Ramsgate, Kent in a severely damaged condition.
Enterprise	Confederate States of America	The 372-bulk-ton sidewheel paddle steamer foundered in the Gulf of Mexico during a storm on or about 15 March.
John Gault	United States	The 198-ton sternwheel paddle steamer foundered at Cairo.

== 16 March ==
List of shipwrecks: 16 March 1862
Ship	State	Description
Freya	United Kingdom	The schooner was driven ashore at Kessingland, Suffolk, United Kingdom. She was on a voyage from Aarhus to London, United Kingdom. She was refloated the next day and taken in to Lowestoft, Suffolk in a leaky condition.
L. B. Winchester	Confederate States of America	American Civil War: Confederate forces scuttled the 180-ton sidewheel paddle steamer as a blockship in the Mississippi River in the Wash Channel near Island Number Ten. On 7 April, the partially submerged wreck was boarded and burned to the waterline.

== 17 March ==
List of shipwrecks: 17 March 1862
Ship	State	Description
King of Italy	United Kingdom	The barque put in to Valparaíso, Chile having been on fire for three weeks and was run ashore. She was on a voyage from Melbourne, Victoria to an English port.

== 18 March ==
List of shipwrecks: 18 March 1862
Ship	State	Description
Asia	United Kingdom	The ship was driven ashore at Brăila, Ottoman Empire.
Izamados	Ottoman Empire	The steamship was driven ashore at Brăila. She was refloated on 24 March.
Jane Morgan	United Kingdom	The ship ran aground in Angle Bay and was damaged. She was on a voyage from Barrow in Furness, Lancashire to Cardiff, Glamorgan. She was refloated and taken in to Milford Haven, Pembrokeshire in a leaky condition.
Mercuito	Ottoman Empire	The barque was driven ashore at Brăila. She was refloated on 24 March.
Montanesa	France	The steamship was driven ashore on Terschelling, Friesland, Netherlands.
Primière	France	The schooner ran aground on Scroby Sands, Norfolk, United Kingdom. She was on a voyage from Newcastle upon Tyne, Northumberland, United Kingdom to Marans, Charente-Inférieure.
Rigas Ferreos	Flag unknown	The ship was driven ashore at Brăila.

== 19 March ==
List of shipwrecks: 19 March 1862
Ship	State	Description
Acacharn	United Kingdom	The ship was wrecked at Deal, Kent with the loss of three of her crew.
Brother and Sister	United Kingdom	The sloop was abandoned off the coast of Lothian and foundered. Her crew were rescued. She was on a voyage from Blyth, Northumberland to Port Dundas, Renfrewshire.
Christina	United Kingdom	The ship was driven ashore at "Metal Man", County Sligo.
Grace	United Kingdom	The ship was wrecked at Deal with the loss of all but three of her crew.
Jupiter	France	The sloop ran aground on the Haisborough Sands, in the North Sea of the coast of Norfolk, United Kingdom and sank. Her crew were rescued. She was on a voyage from Blyth, Northumberland, United Kingdom to a port in the Province of Brabant, Belgium.
Neptune	United States	The 211-ton sternwheel paddle steamer struck a bridge on the Cumberland River at Clarksville, Tennessee.

== 20 March ==
List of shipwrecks: 20 March 1862
Ship	State	Description
Blossom	United Kingdom	The brig was driven ashore at Dovercourt, Essex. She was on a voyage from London to South Shields, County Durham or vice versa. She was refloated on 14 April and towed in to Harwich, Essex.
Colchis	Russia	The steamship collided with the steamship Laconia (United Kingdom) and sank in the Sea of Marmora with the loss of all 52 people on board.
Eagle	United Kingdom	The sloop was driven onto a rock Dulas, Anglesey and was damaged. She was on a voyage from Liverpool, Lancashire to Dulas.
Emerald	United Kingdom	The sloop was driven ashore and wrecked between Wells-next-the-Sea and Blakeney, Norfolk. All on board were rescued. She was on a voyage from Warkworth, Northumberland to Sandwich, Kent.
Eendracht	Prussia	The ship ran aground on the Sunk Sand, in the North Sea off the coast of Essex and was abandoned by her crew, who got aboard the Sunk Lightship ( Trinity House). She was subsequently taken in to Sheerness, Kent in a derelict condition.
Janet	United Kingdom	The sloop collided with the Formby Lightship ( Trinity House) and sank with the loss of one life. She was on a voyage from Garston, Lancashire to Ardrossan, Ayrshire.
Mary	United Kingdom	The ship struck rocks at Dartmouth, Devon and was damaged. She was on a voyage from Waterford to Southampton, Hampshire. She put in to Dartmouth in a leaky condition.
Mary Elizabeth	United Kingdom	The ship was driven ashore and sank at Bridgwater, Somerset.
Nautilus	United Kingdom	The ship ran aground at Lowestoft, Suffolk. She was on a voyage from London to Seaham, County Durham. She was refloated and towed in to Lowestoft.
Sylph	United Kingdom	The ship ran aground on the Gunfleet Sand, in the North Sea off the coast of Essex. She was on a voyage from London to Goole, Yorkshire. She was refloated and assisted in to Harwich, Essex in a leaky condition.
Thames	United Kingdom	The ship was abandoned 6 nautical miles (11 km) north east of Bardsey Island, Pembrokeshire and subsequently foundered. Her crew were rescued by Unicorn (United Kingdom). Thames was on a voyage from Barrow in Furness, Lancashire to Port Talbot, Glamorgan.

== 21 March ==
List of shipwrecks: 21 March 1862
Ship	State	Description
Acorn	United Kingdom	The schooner was driven ashore at Lowestoft, Suffolk. Her crew were rescued.
Argo	United Kingdom	The brig was driven ashore at Koserow, Prussia. She was on a voyage from Middlesbrough, Yorkshire to Swinemünde, Prussia. She was later refloated with assistance from a steamship and taken in to Swinemünde.
Director	Unknown	The Barque ran ground on Craysfort Reef, Florida and was wrecked.
Onward	United Kingdom	The steamship foundered in the North Sea off Flamborough Head, Yorkshire. All on board were rescued. She was on a voyage from Middlesbrough, Yorkshire to London.
Sarah Bell	United Kingdom	The collier, a brig was driven ashore at Great Yarmouth, Norfolk with the loss of all hands.
Success	United Kingdom	The ship was wrecked at Demerara, British Guiana with the loss of nine of her crew.

== 22 March ==
List of shipwrecks: 22 March 1862
Ship	State	Description
Bellevue	Prussia	The ship ran aground off Ven, Sweden. She was on a voyage from Sunderland, County Durham, United Kingdom to Memel. She was later refloated with assistance and resumed her voyage.
Des Arc	United States	The 276-ton sidewheel paddle steamer caught fire, probably while on the White River at Duvall's Bluff, Arkansas. After she was towed across the river, the sidewheel paddle steamer USS Queen of the West (United States Navy) sank her with gunfire to prevent the fire from spreading to other steamers nearby.
Gleaner	United Kingdom	The brigantine was driven ashore and severely damaged at Teignmouth, Devon. She was on a voyage from South Shields, County Durham to Teignmouth. She was refloated the next day and towed in to Teignmouth.
Rising Sun	United Kingdom	The ship was driven ashore at Teignmouth. She was on a voyage from Neath, Glamorgan to Teignmouth.
Thames	United Kingdom	The ship was abandoned in the Irish Sea 6 nautical miles (11 km) north east of Bardsey Island, Pembrokeshire. Her crew were rescued. She was on a voyage from Barrow-in-Furness, Lancashire to Port Talbot, Glamorgan.

== 23 March ==
List of shipwrecks: 23 March 1862
Ship	State	Description
Lisette	Prussia	The barque was driven ashore and wrecked in Ballycroneen Bay. Her crew were rescued. She was on a voyage from Queenstown, County Cork, United Kingdom to Antwerp, Belgium.

== 24 March ==
List of shipwrecks: 24 March 1862
Ship	State	Description
Belvidera	United Kingdom	The ship sank. Her crew were rescued. She was on a voyage from Cardiff, Glamorgan to London.
Borodino	United States	Gale of 24 March:The schooner was disabled and abandoned on the Georges Bank. Crew taken off by schooner Peerless (United States).
Mary Elizabeth	United Kingdom	The ship was driven ashore near Drogheda, County Louth. She was on a voyage from Larne, County Antrim to Cardigan.
Paisano	United Kingdom	The brig was wrecked on the Goodwin Sands, Kent. She was on a voyage from Antwerp, Belgium to the Clyde.
Queen of the Fleer	United Kingdom	The lugger was run down and sunk by the steamship Brigadier (United Kingdom) off Ness Point, Suffolk. Her crew were rescued.
Quickstep	United States	Gale of 24 March:The schooner was disabled and abandoned on the Georges Bank. Crew taken off by schooner Northern Chief (United States).

== 25 March ==
List of shipwrecks: 25` March 1862
Ship	State	Description
Uncle Tom	United Kingdom	The Mersey Flat ran aground on the Dutchman Sandbank, in the Irish Sea off the coast of Anglesey and was abandoned. She was on a voyage from Liverpool, Lancashire to Caernarfon. She subsequently floated off and sank off Penmaenmawr, Caernarfonshire.

== 26 March ==
List of shipwrecks: 26 March 1862
Ship	State	Description
Empire	United States	Partly loaded with cotton, the brig was lost on the North Edisto Bar off the coast of South Carolina, Confederate States of America.
Henry Milda	United Kingdom	The ship was wrecked on the Corton Sand, in the North Sea off the coast of Suffolk. She was on a voyage from Marseille, Bouches-du-Rhône, France to Great Yarmouth, Norfolk.
Nereide	France	The ship was run down and sunk by a steamship. Her crew were rescued. She was on a voyage from Bordeaux, Gironde to Swansea, Glamorgan, United Kingdom.

== 27 March ==
List of shipwrecks: 27 March 1862
Ship	State	Description
Catharina Louisa	Netherlands	The schooner ran aground on the Herd Sand, in the North Sea off the coast of County Durham, United Kingdom. She was refloated and towed back to North Shields, Northumberland, United Kingdom by the tug Lion (United Kingdom).
George Washington	Confederate States of America	American Civil War, Union blockade: Carrying a cargo of rice, rice meal, and corn, the schooner was captured, scuttled, and burned in Bull's Bay off the coast of South Carolina near Cape Romain Light and the Santee River by an armed boat expedition from the barque USS Restless (United States Navy).
James	United Kingdom	The schooner sprang a leak and sank in the Bristol Channel off Lundy Island, Devon with the loss of four of her five crew.
Mary Louisa	Confederate States of America	American Civil War, Union blockade: Carrying a cargo of rice and corn, the sloop was captured and burned in the Santee River near Cape Romain, South Carolina, by an armed boat expedition from the barque USS Restless (United States Navy).
Waldemar	Norway	The schooner was wrecked at Beadnell, Northumberland. Her crew were rescued. She was on a voyage from Tønsberg to Newcastle upon Tyne, Northumberland.

== 28 March ==
List of shipwrecks: 28 March 1862
Ship	State	Description
Beaufort	United Kingdom	The ship ran aground on the Cross Sand, in the North Sea off the coast of Norfolk.
Hope	United Kingdom	The ship was driven ashore at Gibraltar. She was refloated on 1 April with assistance from a tug.
Masanielle	United Kingdom	The barque was run ashore in Mathieson Bay in a sinking condition and was wrecked. She was on a voyage from Moulmein, Burma to Falmouth, Cornwall or Queenstown, County Cork.
Minnesota Belle	United States	The 225-ton sidewheel paddle steamer struck a snag and sank in the Illinois River at Liverpool, Illinois.
Tom John Taylor	United Kingdom	The collier struck rocks at Whitburn, County Durham. She was towed in to Sunderland, County Durham in a leaky condition.

== 29 March ==
List of shipwrecks: 29 March 1862
Ship	State	Description
Louisa	United Kingdom	The brig ran aground on the Hittarp Reef, off the coast of Sweden. She was on a voyage from South Shields, County Durham to Swinemünde, Prussia. She was refloated and taken in to Helsingør, Denmark.
Pleasant	United Kingdom	The schooner was driven ashore at Little Brighton, Cheshire. She was on a voyage from Preston, Lancashire to Runcorn, Cheshire.
Tagus	United Kingdom	The schooner was driven ashore and wrecked at Nazareth, Portugal. Her crew were rescued. She was on a voyage from Liverpool, Lancashire to Lisbon, Portugal.
Thirty-one States	United States	The ship was wrecked at Cape Sulerno, Spain with the loss of twelve of her crew. She was on a voyage from Newport, Monmouthshire, United Kingdom to Genoa, Italy.
Torch	United Kingdom	The steamship ran aground at Howth Head, County Dublin. she was on a voyage from Liverpool to Dublin. She was refloated and taken in to Dublin.
Two Sisters	United Kingdom	The ship was driven ashore at Cape Arkona, Rügen, Prussia. Her crew were rescued. She was on a voyage from Newcastle upon Tyne, Northumberland to Swinemünde, Prussia.
Unidentified schooner	Confederate States of America	American Civil War, Union blockade: The schooner, loaded with a cargo of rice and cornmeal, was burned on the Santee River in South Carolina by a boat party from the barque USS Restless (United States Navy).

== 30 March ==
List of shipwrecks: 30 March 1862
Ship	State	Description
Cygnet	Confederate States of America	American Civil War, Union blockade: The pilot boat was captured at Appalachicola, Florida, by boats from the gunboat USS Sagamore (United States Navy), then was run aground on a 7-foot (2.1-meter) bar and burned.
Mary Olivia	Confederate States of America	American Civil War, Union blockade: The pilot boat, a sloop, was captured at Appalachicola, Florida, by boats from the gunboat USS Sagamore (United States Navy), then was run aground on a 7-foot (2.1-meter) bar and burned.
New Island	Confederate States of America	American Civil War, Union blockade: The schooner was captured at Appalachicola, Florida, by boats from the gunboat USS Sagamore (United States Navy), then was run aground on a 7-foot (2.1-meter) bar and burned.
Rover	Denmark	The ship ran aground at Frederikshavn. She was on a voyage from Holbaek to Frederikshavn. She was refloated.

== 31 March ==
List of shipwrecks: 31 March 1862
Ship	State	Description
Albemarle	United States	American Civil War: While evacuating wounded at New Bern, North Carolina, Confederate States of America, the sternwheel transport struck piles in New Bern Harbor and sank immediately. The screw steamer USS Louisiana (United States Navy) destroyed her wreck on 4 April.
Flying Childers	United Kingdom	The paddle tug collided with the steamship Rose (United Kingdom) and sank. Her crew were rescued. She was on a voyage from Limerick to Glasgow, Renfrewshire.
Ocean Queen	United Kingdom	The ship was abandoned off Whitburn, County Durham. She was on a voyage from Sunderland, County Durham to London. She was towed in to Sunderland the next day by the tugs Belmont and William and John (both United Kingdom).
Vibilia	United Kingdom	The barque was driven ashore and wrecked at Souter Point, County Durham. Her ten crew survived. She was on a voyage from Sunderland to Montreal, Province of Canada, British North America.

== Unknown date ==
List of shipwrecks: Unknown date March 1862
Ship	State	Description
Alexandra	(United Kingdom of Great Britain and Ireland) Guernsey	The schooner was wrecked on the Longsand, in the North Sea off the coast of Essex. Her crew were rescued by Queen Victoria (United Kingdom).
Alice	United Kingdom	The brigantine was wrecked at Halifax, Nova Scotia, British North America.
Anastasia	United Kingdom	The brig foundered off Lisbon, Portugal. Her crew were rescued. She was on a voyage from Newport, Monmouthshire, United Kingdom to Lisbon.
Ann Jane	United Kingdom	The ship ran aground at Pillau before 3 March.
Arcadian	United Kingdom	The ship was wrecked near the mouth of the Rio Grande.
Asia	United Kingdom	The ship foundered in the Irish Sea before 12 March.
Camilla (possibly renamed Memphis)	Confederate States of America	American Civil War: The yacht was scuttled in Dunns Creek near Crescent City, Florida, to prevent her capture by Union forces. She later was raised and repaired.
Cloud	United Kingdom	The ship was wrecked at São Miguel Island, Azores.
Contest	United Kingdom	The ship was wrecked at São Miguel Island.
Eleanor	United Kingdom	The ship was abandoned in the Atlantic Ocean. Her crew were rescued by Autocrat (United Kingdom). Eleanor was on a voyage from New York, United States to Gloucester.
Elgin	United Kingdom	The ship was lost at Nuevitas, Cuba. She was on a voyage from Liverpool, Lancashire to Havana, Cuba.
Emma	United Kingdom	The ship was wrecked on Sal Island, Cape Verde Islands.
Esmerelda	United Kingdom	The barque was wrecked near Half Moon Key. Her crew survived.
Eugenie	United Kingdom	The ship was wrecked on the Riding Rocks. She was on a voyage from Jamaica to London.
Fairfax	Confederate States of America	American Civil War: Confederate forces burned the full-rigged ship on Quantico Creek in Virginia in early March.
Friends	United Kingdom	The brig ran aground on the Longsand. She was refloated with assistance from Queen Victoria (United Kingdom).
Giovanni	Flag unknown	The ship was abandoned in the Atlantic Ocean before 28 March. She was on a voyage from New York to Queenstown, County Cork, United Kingdom.
Gitana	United Kingdom	The ship foundered in the Atlantic Ocean before 26 March. Her crew survived. She was on a voyage from Philadelphia, Pennsylvania, United States to Cork.
Harmony	United Kingdom	The brig was wrecked on the Cray Joee Rocks, off the coast of Cumberland on 4 or 6 March with the loss of all hands. She was on a voyage from Workington, Cumberland to an Irish port.
Hesky	Hamburg	The brig foundered in the Bay of Biscay. Her crew were rescued. She was on a voyage from Cardiff to Lisbon.
Iskendasia	United Kingdom	The ship was wrecked on Formosa before 10 March.
Janet	United Kingdom	The sloop collided with the Formby Lightship ( Trinity House) and sank. She was on a voyage from Garston, Lancashire to Ardrossan, Ayrshire. She had been refloated by 24 March and beached.
Jessamy	Grand Duchy of Mecklenburg-Schwerin	The brig was wrecked at Cape Spartel, Morocco with the loss of seven of her crew before 6 March. She was on a voyage from Newcastle upon Tyne, Northumberland, United Kingdom to Constantinople, Ottoman Empire.
John Hant	Nicaragua	The steamship sank in Lake Managua. Her crew survived.
Kentina	Confederate States of America	The ship foundered. She was on a voyage from Charleston, South Carolina to Holmstad, Norway.
Lady Gorden Cumming	United Kingdom	The ship ran aground at Nidingen, Sweden. She was refloated and taken in to Helsingør, Denmark in a leaky condition.
Maria Edgeworth	United Kingdom	The ship was wrecked on Faial Island, Azores.
Mary Ellen	United Kingdom	The brig was abandoned in the Bay of Biscay. She was on a voyage from South Shields, County Durham to Alicante, Spain.
Matanzas	Spain	The ship was wrecked near Buenos Aires, Argentina.
Peter Ancus	United Kingdom	The ship was driven ashore at Kristiansand, Norway.
HMS Plover	Royal Navy	The Philomel-class gunvessel was driven ashore on the coast of Mexico. She was later refloated.
Rapid	United Kingdom	The ship sank in the Atlantic Ocean before 24 March.
Robert Pennell	United Kingdom	The ship was wrecked on Faial Island.
Sarah	Hamburg	The ship was abandoned at sea. She was on a voyage from Haiti to Hamburg.
Sophia	United Kingdom	The brig was abandoned at sea in a sinking condition.
Thomas Lawrence	United Kingdom	The ship was run into by Schwalve (Hamburg) and sank at Hamburg.
Trafalgar	United Kingdom	The ship sprang a leak and was beached at Barnardo Point, Bahamas, where she was wrecked. She was on a voyage from Belize City, British Honduras to Falmouth, Cornwall.
Uncle Tom	United Kingdom	The brigantine was wrecked on Formosa before 15 March with the loss of 33 lives.
Vier Gezustus	Netherlands	The barque was wrecked on the Longsand. Her crew were rescued by Queen Victoria (United Kingdom).
Windermere	United Kingdom	The ship foundered. Her crew were rescued. She was on a voyage from Sunderland, County Durham to Bordeaux, Gironde, France.
Unidentified schooner	Confederate States of America	American Civil War: Confederate forces scuttled the schooner in Quantico Creek in early March.
Unidentified vessels	Confederate States of America	American Civil War: The vessels were scuttled as blockships in the Nottoway River in Virginia.
