= USS Zouave =

Tender of the United States Navy

History

United States
- Laid down: unknown date
- Launched: 1861
- Acquired: 20 December 1861
- Commissioned: 1 February 1862
- Decommissioned: 14 June 1865
- Fate: Sold, 12 July 1865

General characteristics
- Displacement: 127 tons
- Draft: 9 ft (2.7 m)
- Propulsion: steam engine, screw propelled
- Speed: 10 knots (19 km/h; 12 mph)
- Armament: two 30-pounder rifled Parrott guns

USS Zouave was a steamer acquired by the Union Navy during the American Civil War. She was needed by the Navy to be part of the fleet of ships to prevent blockade runners from entering ports in the Confederacy.

== Service history ==
Zouave—a screw steamer built in 1861 at Albany, New York—was purchased by the Navy on 20 December 1861 at New York City and soon thereafter was delivered to the Navy at Hampton Roads, Virginia, for duty in the North Atlantic Blockading Squadron. On 1 February 1862, she was placed in commission, Acting Master Henry Reaney in command—and assigned the tasks of patrolling the mouth of the James River at night and serving as a tender for frigates USS Congress and USS Cumberland during daylight hours.

Shortly after noon on 8 March, the tug was moored to a wharf at Newport News, Virginia, when the quartermaster spotted some black smoke near the mouth of the Elizabeth River. Zouave got underway and headed across Hampton Roads to investigate. Soon observers on the tug could make out "what to all appearances looked like the roof of a very big barn belching forth smoke as from a chimney on fire." After a Confederate flag came in view, the men on Zouave concluded that the strong looking craft was the long expected Southern ironclad CSS Virginia—the rebuilt Merrimack—finally emerging to challenge the Union blockaders. Zouave then opened up with her 30-pounder Parrott rifle and fired about a half-dozen rounds before she was recalled by a signal hoisted on board Cumberland. By this time, the Union warships in Hampton Roads and batteries at Newport News had also opened fire on the Southern ironclad. When Virginia reached a position abreast of Congress, she fired a broadside into that Union frigate and headed straight for Cumberland.

At this point, Zouave was in between the fire of Virginia, that of her escorts Patrick Henry and Jamestown, and the "friendly" Union guns based ashore at Newport News and Fort Monroe. She kept firing at the Southern ships until she was signaled by Congress to come alongside. The tug quickly obeyed and began the difficult process of taking the blazing frigate in tow. As Zouave was attempting to pull Congress into shoal water where she might be safe from further attacks, Virginia pulled astern of the retreating Union ships and subjected them to broadside after broadside. When Congress grounded, she hoisted a white flag to indicate her surrender.

Zouave cut her towlines; backed up; and, upon pulling free, resumed her firing. Lookouts on the tug thus spotted a signal on Minnesota—which had also grounded but was still in the fight—asking for assistance. While the tug was heading for that plucky Union blockader, she was hit "by a shot which carried away our rudder-post and one of the blades of her propeller wheel." Unable to steer and move straight toward Virginia, Zouave backed up and used her hawser "over our port quarter" to keep moving toward USS Minnesota. During the passage, USS Whitehall arrived on the scene and assisted Zouave to her destination. The battle-damaged tug lay alongside Minnesota throughout the night, ready to assist the Union ships insofar as she was able. The next day, Zouave was upstaged by the newly arrived USS Monitor during that novel ironclad's epic battle with Virginia. On 11 March, she proceeded, in tow, to the Baltimore Navy Yard for repairs.

Zouave returned to Hampton Roads on 3 May 1862. She spent the next six months deployed in Hampton Roads and surrounding waters on guard duty as an armed tug. She also carried out picket and dispatch assignments. On 26 October 1862, Zouave received instructions to hail USS Delaware, then cruising between the Piankatank and York Rivers, Virginia, and ordering her to report to Hampton Roads to prepare for duty in the North Carolina sounds. On 29 October 1862 at Rip Raps, Virginia, after Delaware failed to acknowledge Zouave's recognition signal, Zouave mistakenly fired on Delaware, taking the steamer for a Confederate blockade runner. Returning to Hampton Roads, Zouave and USS Young America towed monitor USS Passaic to the Washington Navy Yard for repairs on 30 November 1862. On 18 January 1863, Zouave captured the small schooner J. C. MoCabe and six prisoners in the James River; and, on the night of 11 and 12 April 1863, she participated in a reconnaissance of Jamestown Island in the James. She served as part of the Union force capturing the formidable Confederate position at Hill's Point on the Nansemond River, Virginia, on 20 April 1863. This relieved Union army positions near Suffolk, Virginia, of Southern pressure.

Zouave steamed to Baltimore, Maryland, for repairs in May 1863. Zouave deteriorated steadily during the remaining two years of the war. On 29 February 1864, she was detailed to Atlanta, Georgia, to guard against possible attacks by Confederate torpedo boats. In April 1864, Zouave sailed to Baltimore for repairs. She soon returned to Hampton Roads, only to be ordered to the Norfolk Navy Yard for more repairs on 4 August 1864. Zouave remained in the yard through early December 1864, then was deployed in the James River until the war's end. After a final round of repairs at Norfolk, the tug proceeded to the New York Navy Yard on 1 June 1865. Zouave was decommissioned at New York on 14 June 1865 and was sold at public auction there to M. O. Roberts on 12 July 1865.
