= USS R. B. Forbes =

American Civil War-era steam ship

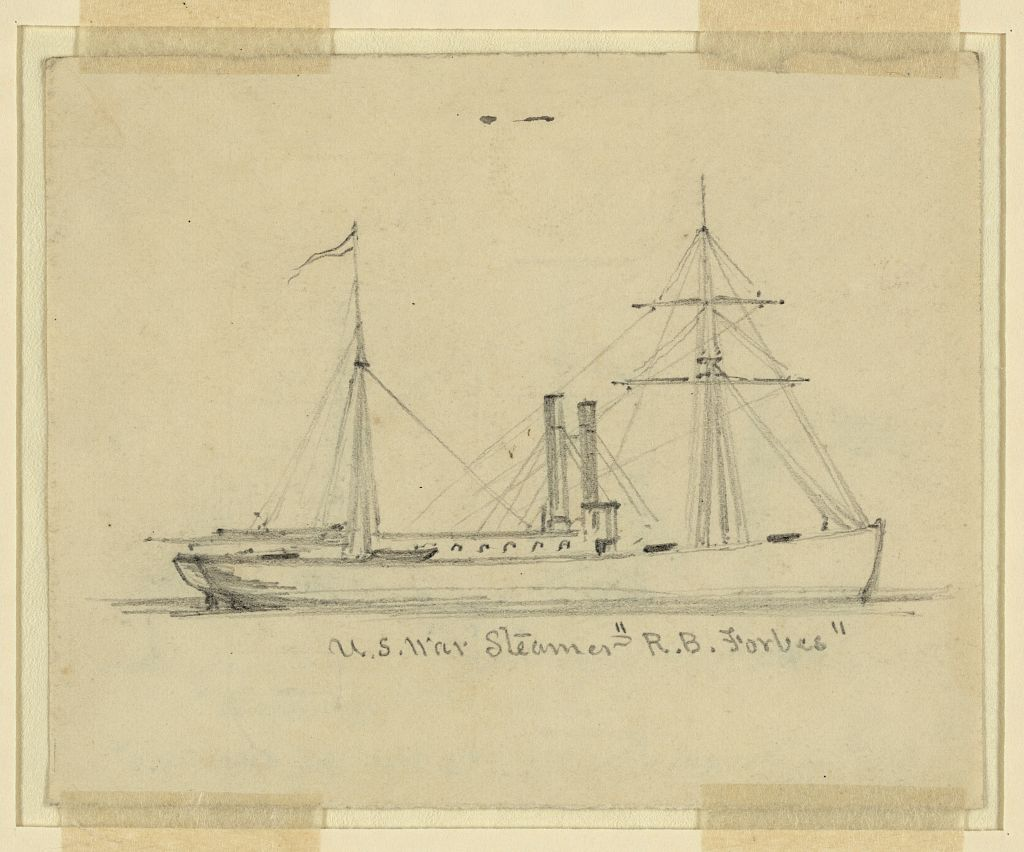
- Sketch of the USS R. B. Forbes by Alfred Waud

History

United States
- Name: USS R. B. Forbes
- Namesake: Robert Bennet Forbes
- Launched: 1845 or 1846
- Acquired: August 17, 1861
- Commissioned: August 1861
- Fate: Wrecked February 25, 1862

General characteristics
- Type: Steamer
- Displacement: 320 or 329 tons
- Length: 121 feet (37 metres)
- Beam: 25 feet 6 inches (7.77 metres)
- Draft: 12 ft 3 in (3.73 m)
- Depth of hold: 11 ft 7 in (3.53 m)
- Propulsion: 2 x condensing engines; 2 × screw propellers
- Speed: 11 knots (13 miles per hour; 20 kilometres per hour) (max.)
- Complement: 51
- Armament: 2x 32 pounders (15 kilograms) guns; 1x 30 pdr (14 kg) rifled gun

USS R. B. Forbes was a steamer acquired by the Union Navy during the American Civil War. Originally built in either 1845 or 1846, the vessel saw service as a tugboat and briefly a lightship at Boston, Massachusetts. Built by Otis Tufts and named after Robert Bennet Forbes, she was the first iron mercantile vessel built in New England.

Purchased by the Union Navy in 1861 for $52,500 (equivalent to $1,900,000 in 2025), she was converted to a warship and saw action during the Battle of Port Royal on November 7. On February 25, 1862, en route to join the Mortar Flotilla, she was wrecked on the Currituck Banks in a storm and was burned to prevent capture.

== Construction and characteristics ==
R. B. Forbes was constructed in 1845 or 1846 at Boston, Massachusetts. A screw steamer used as a tugboat, as well as a wrecking tug, she was 121 feet (37 metres) long with a beam of 25 ft 6 in (7.77 m) had a draft of 12 feet 3 inches (3.73 metres), could go a speed of 11 knots (20 kilometres per hour; 13 miles per hour), and displaced 320 or 329 tons. The vessel's depth of hold was 11 ft 7 in (3.53 m). Power came from the set of two screw propellers, which were driven by two condensing engines measuring 26 in (66 centimetres) by 32 in (81 cm). The engines were fed by two boilers. Her hull was made of iron. She was built by shipbuilder and inventor Otis Tufts and named after Robert Bennet Forbes, a captain and ship owner who helped originate the concept of the ship. R. B. Forbes was the first iron mercantile vessel built in New England.

== Service career ==
R. B. Forbes was in service by early January 1846. She was used as a towboat in Boston Harbor, bringing clipper ships into the open ocean. In 1847, when USS Jamestown began her journey to Ireland to provide relief related to the Great Famine, the organizers of the relief mission watched from aboard R. B. Forbes. In September 1850, she suffered about $100 (equivalent to $4,000 in 2025) of damage in a fire. R. B. Forbes also briefly saw service as a lightship: from April 18 to May 22, 1851, she was stationed at Minots Ledge while the regularly assigned lightship was en route. She towed the clipper Great Republic from Boston to New York City in 1853. Seven years later, the vessel towed the schooner Spring Hill (later known as United States) to Nantasket Roads in preparation for Isaac Israel Hayes's Arctic expedition. In 1860, the Wilmington Daily Herald described her as "as sound now as when first built" and compared her favorably to the similar, but wooden, vessel Enoch Train. R. B. Forbes was not financially successful, and went through several owners.

In 1861, the Union Navy purchased the ship for use in the American Civil War, at a cost of $52,500 (equivalent to $1,900,000 in 2025). The acquisition began on August 17, but was not formalized until September 20. The vessel was commissioned in August. After being outfitted in Boston, R. B. Forbes left on August 25 under the command of Acting Master William G. Gregory for the Washington Navy Yard, where she spent most of September. The Navy armed her with two 32-pounder cannons and a rifled 30-pounder gun. She was manned by a crew of 51. R. B. Forbes was first assigned to service in the Chesapeake Bay area, but then was ordered to join the South Atlantic Blockading Squadron. Having left to join the blockading squadron in late October, she arrived in time to fight in the Battle of Port Royal on November 7; the battle ended with Union forces capturing Fort Walker and Fort Beauregard from the Confederates. Under the command of Lieutenant Henry S. Newcomb, the vessel fired 43 artillery rounds at a Confederate artillery battery on land. Newcomb reported that some of the shells fired had issues with jamming in the cannons' barrels.

After remaining in the Port Royal area until December, she was towed to New York by the steamboat Atlantic, as she had suffered damage to her port shaft and propeller. After arriving on December 20, she was decommissioned for repairs. After being recommissioned on February 8, 1862, R. B. Forbes was ordered to journey to join the Mortar Flotilla, a collection of ships armed with mortars designed to bombard fortifications into submission, near New Orleans, Louisiana. During the way, she was caught in a storm on February 25, off of Nags Head, North Carolina, and driven onto the Currituck Banks. Her propellers were broken during the wreck, and as it was deemed impossible to get her dislodged, she was burned to prevent capture. The ship's crew and salvageable equipment were taken off by Young America.

== See also ==
- List of United States Navy ships

== Sources ==
- Bradlee, Francis B. C. (1920). Some Account of Steam Navigation in New England. Salem, Massachusetts: Essex Institute.
- Bunting, W. H. (1971). Portrait of a Port: Boston, 1852–1914. Cambridge, Massachusetts: The Belknap Press of Harvard University Press. ISBN 0-674-69076-1.
- Flint, Willard (1989). Lightships of the United States Government. Washington, D. C.: Coast Guard Historian's Office.
- Fowler, William M. (1986). "Sloop of War/Sloop of Peace: Robert Bennet Forbes and the USS Jamestown". Proceedings of the Massachusetts Historical Society. 3. 98: 49–59. JSTOR 25080960.
- Gaines, W. Craig (2008). Encyclopedia of Civil War Shipwrecks. Baton Rouge, Louisiana: Louisiana State University Press. ISBN 978-0-8071-3274-6.
- Hearn, Chester G. (1995). The Capture of New Orleans 1862. Baton Rouge, Louisiana: Louisiana State University Press. ISBN 0-8071-1945-8.
- Morrison, J. H. (October 28, 1905). "Iron and Steel Hull Steam Vessels of the United States". Scientific American (1556): 24928–24930.
- Official Records of the Union and Confederate Navies in the War of the Rebellion. 1. Vol. 6. Washington, D. C.: Government Printing Office. 1897.
- Official Records of the Union and Confederate Navies in the War of the Rebellion. 1. Vol. 12. Washington, D. C.: Government Printing Office. 1901.
- Old Shipping Days in Boston. Boston, Massachusetts: State Street Trust Company. 1918.
- Puleo, Stephen (2020). Voyage of Mercy: The USS Jamestown, the Irish Famine, and the Remarkable Story of America's First Humanitarian Mission. New York: St. Martin's Griffin. ISBN 978-1-2502-0047-1.
- Silverstone, Paul H. (2006). Civil War Navies 1855–1883. New York: Routledge. ISBN 978-0-415-97870-5.
- Ujifusa, Steven (2018). Barons of the Sea: And Their Race to Build the World's Fastest Clipper. New York: Simon & Schuster. ISBN 978-1-4767-4597-8.

35.824°N 75.550°W
