= Otis Tufts =

American inventor

Otis Tufts I
- Born: February 14, 1804; Cambridge, Massachusetts
- Died: November 5, 1869 (aged 65); Boston, Massachusetts
- Spouse: Sarah Caroline Oliver (m. 1824–1869)
- Children: Otis Tufts II
- Parent(s): Stephen Tufts; Lucy Frost
- Relatives: Robert Channing Seamans Jr., greatgrandson

Otis Tufts (February 14, 1804 - November 5, 1869) was a machinist and inventor who built printing machines, steam engines, firefighting equipment and invented the steam pile driver.

== Biography ==
Otis Tufts was born in Cambridge, Massachusetts, in 1804 to Stephen Tufts and Lucy Frost Tufts. He had a twin brother, Joseph Tufts who died on July 24, 1807. On April 1, 1824, he married Sarah Caroline Oliver (1803-1868), in Malden, Massachusetts. Sarah was the daughter of William Oliver and Sarah Caroline Cheever. Together they had four children: Sarah, Eliza, Caroline and Otis.

In 1837, he built a steam-operated printing press. In addition, he built the first double-hulled iron steamship. He died in 1869, at the age of 65.
