= USS Young America =

Tender of the United States Navy

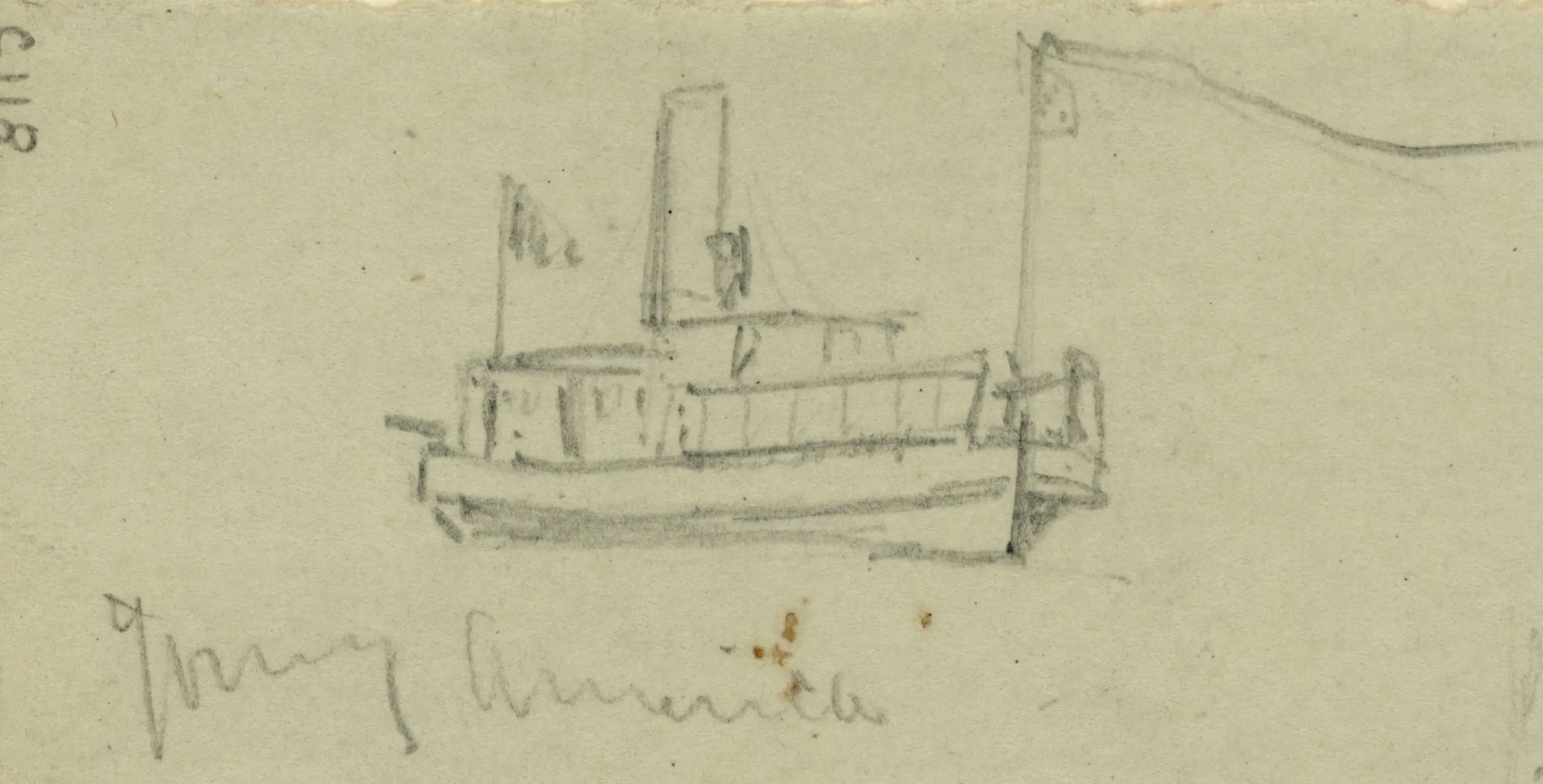
- Sketch of the confederate tender Young America.

History

United States
- Laid down: 1855
- Launched: 1855
- Acquired: 7 January 1864
- Commissioned: 26 February 1862
- Decommissioned: 9 June 1865
- Captured: from Confederate forces; 24 April 1861
- Fate: Sold, 12 July 1865

General characteristics
- Displacement: 173 tons
- Draft: 10 ft 6 in (3.20 m)
- Propulsion: steam engine, screw propelled
- Armament: one 30-pounder rifled Parrott gun; one 32-pounder gun; one 12-pounder rifled gun

USS Young America was a Confederate steamer captured by the Union Navy's blockade vessels, and subsequently placed in-service in the Union Navy during the American Civil War.

== Service history ==
On 24 April 1861, Union sloop-of-war USS Cumberland captured Young America in Hampton Roads, Virginia, as that Confederate tug attempted to help blockade-running schooner George M. Smith enter the James River laden with munitions for the Confederacy. Cumberland armed the prize—a screw steamer built in 1855 at New York City—and used her as a tender. However, early in June, Young America was ordered to the Washington Navy Yard for repairs to her machinery. She broke down while en route and was towed up the Potomac River by Union steamer USS Resolute.

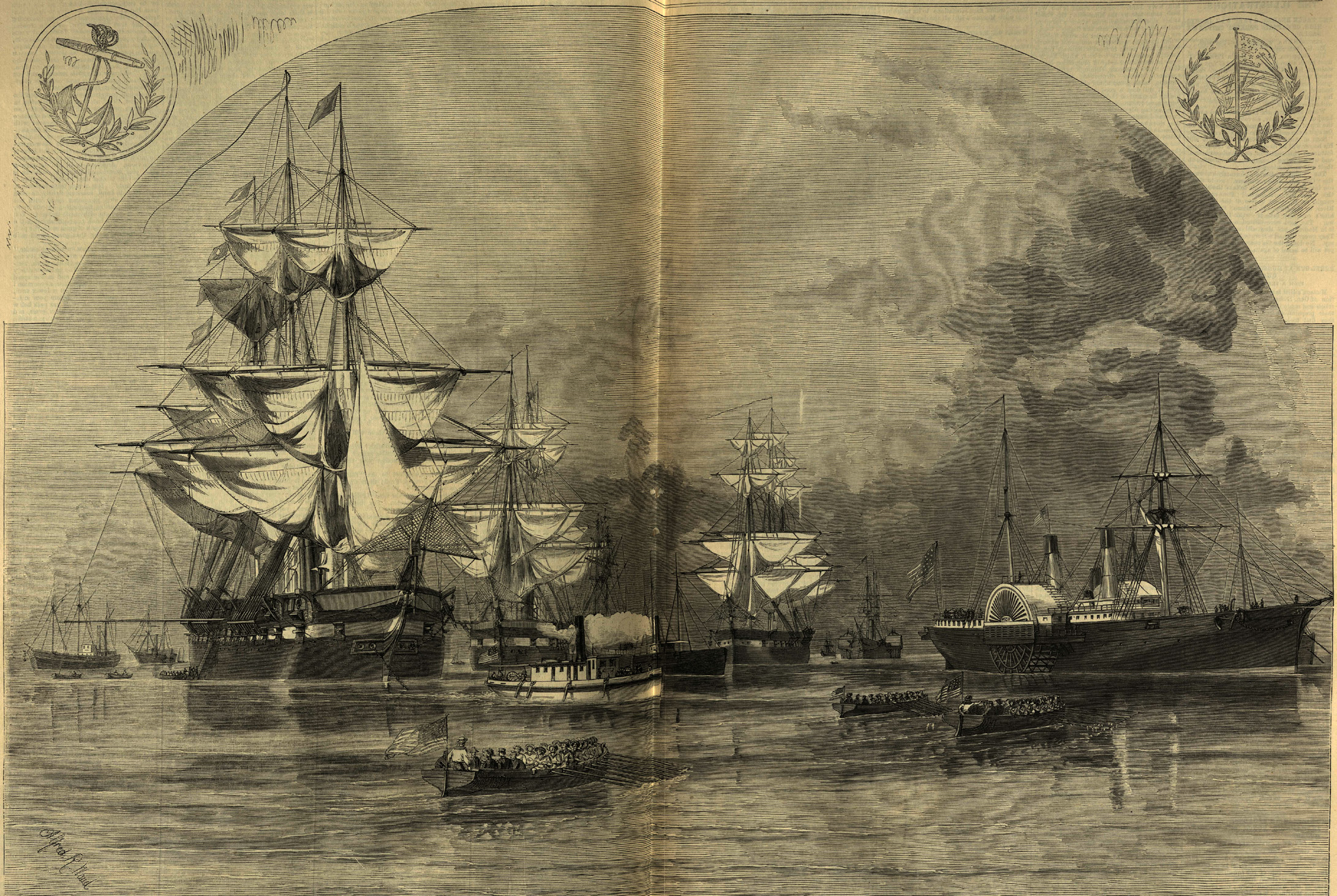
USS Young America (center) with Daylight, Wabash, Union, Cumberland and other ships at Hampton Roads.

Repairs completed, the tug departed Washington, D.C., late in July, bound for Hampton Roads and duty with the North Atlantic Blockading Squadron. After patrol and reconnaissance assignments, Young America proceeded to the Baltimore Navy Yard on 13 October 1861 for further repairs and returned to duty in Hampton Roads late in November. On 26 February 1862, the vessel briefly left the Virginia Capes area for Currituck Inlet, North Carolina, to rescue crewmen and stores threatened with capture when Union screw steamer USS R. B. Forbes grounded on 25 February.

Young America performed invaluable service to the squadron during engagements with CSS Virginia (the former Federal screw frigate Merrimack) on 8 and 9 March 1862. On 8 March, Young America towed USS Roanoke to an anchorage off Sewell's Point, Virginia, enabling the frigate to bombard Confederate batteries ashore. On 9 March, she refloated the grounded Union frigate, USS St. Lawrence, and jockeyed the vessel into firing position against Virginia. Later, Young America rescued the crew of Union gunboat USS Whitehall when fire destroyed that vessel on 10 March 1862. She also rescued personnel on board Henry Adams, grounded at Nag's Head, North Carolina, on 26 August 1862. Young America left for repairs at the Baltimore Navy Yard in September.

Young America returned to Hampton Roads in mid-October 1862, resuming duties as an armed guard tug. On 30 November 1862, Zouave and Young America towed the monitor USS Passaic to the Washington Navy Yard for repairs but returned to Newport News, Virginia, early in December and, but for occasional runs north, operated in the vicinity of Hampton Roads and the James River through the end of the Civil War. On 7 January 1864, the tug was finally purchased by the Navy from the Boston prize court. Young America was assigned to captured Confederate ram CSS Atlanta for use as a tug on 9 April 1864 and assisted troops under General Wild in repulsing a Confederate attack upon Wilson's Wharf, James River, Virginia, on 24 May 1864. She remained with the James River Squadron, Fourth Division, until the end of the war. Young America was decommissioned on 9 June 1865 at the Norfolk Navy Yard and was sold at public auction at New York City on 12 July 1865 to Camden & Amboy Railroad Co.
