= USS Restless (1861) =

Gunboat of the United States Navy

History

United States
- Name: Restless
- Acquired: 26 August 1861
- Commissioned: December 1861
- Decommissioned: 1865
- Fate: Sold, 21 September 1865

General characteristics
- Tonnage: 265
- Length: 108 ft 8 in (33.12 m)
- Beam: 27 ft 8 in (8.43 m)
- Depth of hold: 9 ft 11 in (3.02 m)
- Propulsion: sail
- Sail plan: bark
- Armament: four 32-pounder guns

USS Restless was a barque acquired by the Union Navy during the American Civil War.

She was used as a gunboat by the Union Navy to patrol navigable waterways of the Confederacy to prevent the South from trading with other countries.

== Service history ==
Restless was purchased from Everett and Hawley at New York City on 26 August 1861 and commissioned the following December, Acting Volunteer Lt. Edward Conroy in command. Ordered south upon commissioning, Restless sailed to Norfolk, Virginia, took on supplies for the South Atlantic Blockading Squadron, and toward the end of January 1862 arrived at Port Royal, South Carolina. Assigned to the blockade force off Charleston, South Carolina, she took up station off Bull's Bay on 4 February. On the 11th, two escaped slaves provided information on the ships carrying food into Charleston, their use of inland water routes, and conditions in the blockaded city. Two days later, Restless, following that information, discovered three vessels within the shoals. On the 14th, armed boats from Restless captured and destroyed the sloop Edisto and the schooners Wandoo, Elizabeth, and Theodore Stony. All vessels had been carrying rice. At the end of March, Restless put into Port Royal for provisioning. By then she had intercepted five more blockade runners; two schooners were kept as prizes; one sloop and two schooners were destroyed.

Ordered back to the Charleston area on 15 April, she took up station between Rattlesnake Shoal and Caper's Island. On 2 May she captured the schooner Flash and sent her to New York for adjudication. On the 11th she returned to Bull's Bay. Between then and the end of October, Restless captured the steamer Scotia, two sloops, and a large canoe; and assisted in intercepting two other steamers and a schooner. In November and December, inland expeditions were stepped up. On 5 November, a shore party sent to Palmetto Point intercepted a mail shipment bound for Charleston which provided further intelligence for the campaign against blockade runners. In December, shore parties burned the salt works on Harbor Creek and destroyed Confederate batteries and magazines on Bull's Island. In late January 1863, after 13 months of duty, Restless sailed north for docking and repairs. By mid-June, however, she had returned to blockade duty.

Assigned to the Eastern Gulf Blockading Squadron, she operated off the coast of western Florida for the remainder of the war. Initially stationed at St. George's Sound, she captured a schooner and a sloop in Peace Creek, Charlotte Harbor in early July and took the schooner Erniti 60 miles off Tampa Bay on 19 August. In October she relieved USS Roebuck in St. Andrew Sound and remained on duty there until November 1864. During that time she seized several vessels and destroyed salt works which supplied Confederate forces in U.S. state of Georgia. In mid-November, the bark sailed to Key West, Florida, for repairs; then, in January 1865, took up station again in Charlotte Harbor. At the end of March, she shifted to St. Joseph's Bay where she remained until the end of the war. Toward the latter part of June 1865, Restless, carrying surplus ordnance supplies, rounded the Florida peninsula and sailed north. She was sold at auction in Philadelphia, Pennsylvania, on 21 September the same year.
