= USS Whitehall =

Gunboat of the United States Navy

Coordinates: 37.004°N 76.314°W

History

United States
- Laid down: 1850
- Launched: 1850
- Acquired: 10 October 1861
- Commissioned: est. 1861
- Decommissioned: destroyed, 1862
- Stricken: 1862
- Fate: Destroyed by fire, 10 March 1862

General characteristics
- Displacement: 326 tons
- Length: 126 ft (38 m)
- Beam: 28 ft 2 in (8.59 m)
- Draught: 8 ft (2.4 m)
- Propulsion: steam engine; side wheel propelled
- Complement: unknown
- Armament: two 32-pounder Parrott rifles, two 32-pounder guns

USS Whitehall was a steamer acquired by the Union Navy during the American Civil War. She was assigned blockade duty; however, her condition was not always considered seaworthy, and she was plagued with condition problems.

Whitehall—a side-wheel gunboat and converted ferry built in 1850 at Brooklyn, New York City—was purchased by the Navy there on 10 October 1861 and was commissioned soon thereafter at the New York Navy Yard, Acting Master Francis P. Allen in command.

== Assigned to the South Atlantic Blockade ==
Assigned to the South Atlantic Blockading Squadron, Whitehall sailed for Port Royal, South Carolina; but her unseaworthy condition prevented her completing the voyage south. She put into Philadelphia, Pennsylvania, in early November for emergency repairs and stopped again at Hampton Roads for the same purpose a few days later. Whitehall left Newport News, Virginia, for Port Royal on 5 November—only to be forced back to Hampton Roads by high seas on 6 November. On 7 November, carpenters examining Whitehall declared her unseaworthy. Nevertheless, she was badly needed at Port Royal and proceeded south towed by USS Connecticut on 12 November 1861. Again Whitehall turned back, reentering Hampton Roads on 13 November 1861. That same day, she was ordered to Baltimore, Maryland, for an extensive overhaul.

== Reassigned to the North Atlantic Blockade ==
Whitehall was reassigned to the North Atlantic Blockading Squadron in Hampton Roads on 29 November 1861. She departed the Virginia Capes on 6 December 1861, bound for Annapolis, Maryland, to pick up arms and provisions for the squadron and returned to Hampton Roads, On 29 December 1861, Whitehall and eight other steamers engaged CSS Sea Bird in the roads shortly after the Confederate steamer had captured a water schooner and attacked the Army steamer, Express, which had been towing it. After an action lasting one-half hour, Sea Bird withdrew from the battle and retired under the protection of Confederate shore batteries. Whitehall and USS Morse covered Union forces as they withdrew.

== "The worst boat of all ferryboats..." ==
On 2 January 1862, Whitehall got underway for Hatteras Inlet, North Carolina. However, she immediately became disabled and returned to Hampton Roads. Flag Officer Louis M. Goldsborough, commanding the North Atlantic Blockading Squadron, called Whitehall "the worst sea boat of all the ferryboats with which I have had to do, and certainly the most unfortunate." A survey taken of the vessel on 22 February 1862 found both her machinery and hull badly deteriorated.

== Action against the CSS Virginia ==
Whitehall saw her final action on 8 and 9 March 1862 against the Confederate ironclad CSS Virginia, the former Merrimack. On 8 March, federal gunboats, including Whitehall, attempted to draw the Rebel vessel away from Union warships anchored off Newport News, Virginia. Failing this, Whitehall engaged Confederate steamers Yorktown and CSS Jamestown, inflicting minor damage. During the Battle of the Monitor and Merrimack on 9 March 1862, Whitehall and the rest of the Union fleet abstained from direct battle, preferring to fire long-range, ineffective shots at Virginia. Whitehall suffered three casualties and had parts of her upperworks burned by Confederate shot during the two days of activity.

== Whitehall destroyed by fire ==
Early on the morning of March 10, 1862 at Old Point Comfort, Virginia, a flash fire swept and totally destroyed Whitehall. There were no casualties.
