= Battle of Albemarle Sound =

1864 American Civil War naval battle

- Part of the American Civil War
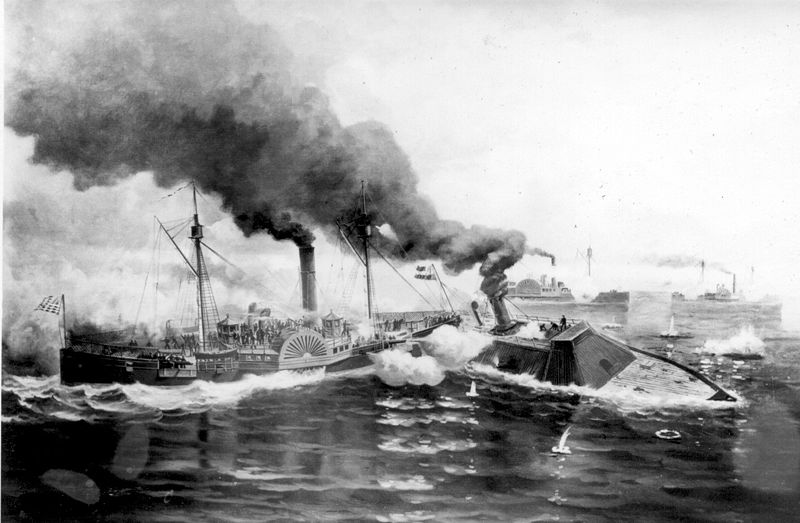
- USS Sassacus ramming CSS Albemarle
Date	May 5, 1864
Location	Albemarle Sound, North Carolina 35°58′42.82″N 76°32′12.99″W
Result	Inconclusive

Belligerents
United States	(Confederate States of America) Confederate States

Commanders and leaders
(United States Navy) Melancton Smith	(Confederate States of America) James W. Cooke

Strength
8 gunboats	1 ironclad 2 steamers

Casualties and losses
31 killed or wounded	57 killed or wounded
- Location within North Carolina

The Battle of Albemarle Sound was an inconclusive naval battle fought in May 1864 along the coast of North Carolina during the American Civil War. Three Confederate warships, including an ironclad, engaged eight Union gunboats. The action ended indecisively due to the sunset.

== Background ==
In April 1864, a Confederate Army, with the aid of the CSS Albemarle, forced the surrender of the Union garrison at Plymouth. Robert Hoke, commander of a Confederate Army in North Carolina, encouraged by his success at Plymouth attempted to retake New Bern which had been in Union control since early in 1862. For his proposed attack on New Bern Hoke again turned to the aid of Albemarle, which had been a decisive factor in the Battle of Plymouth.

== Battle ==
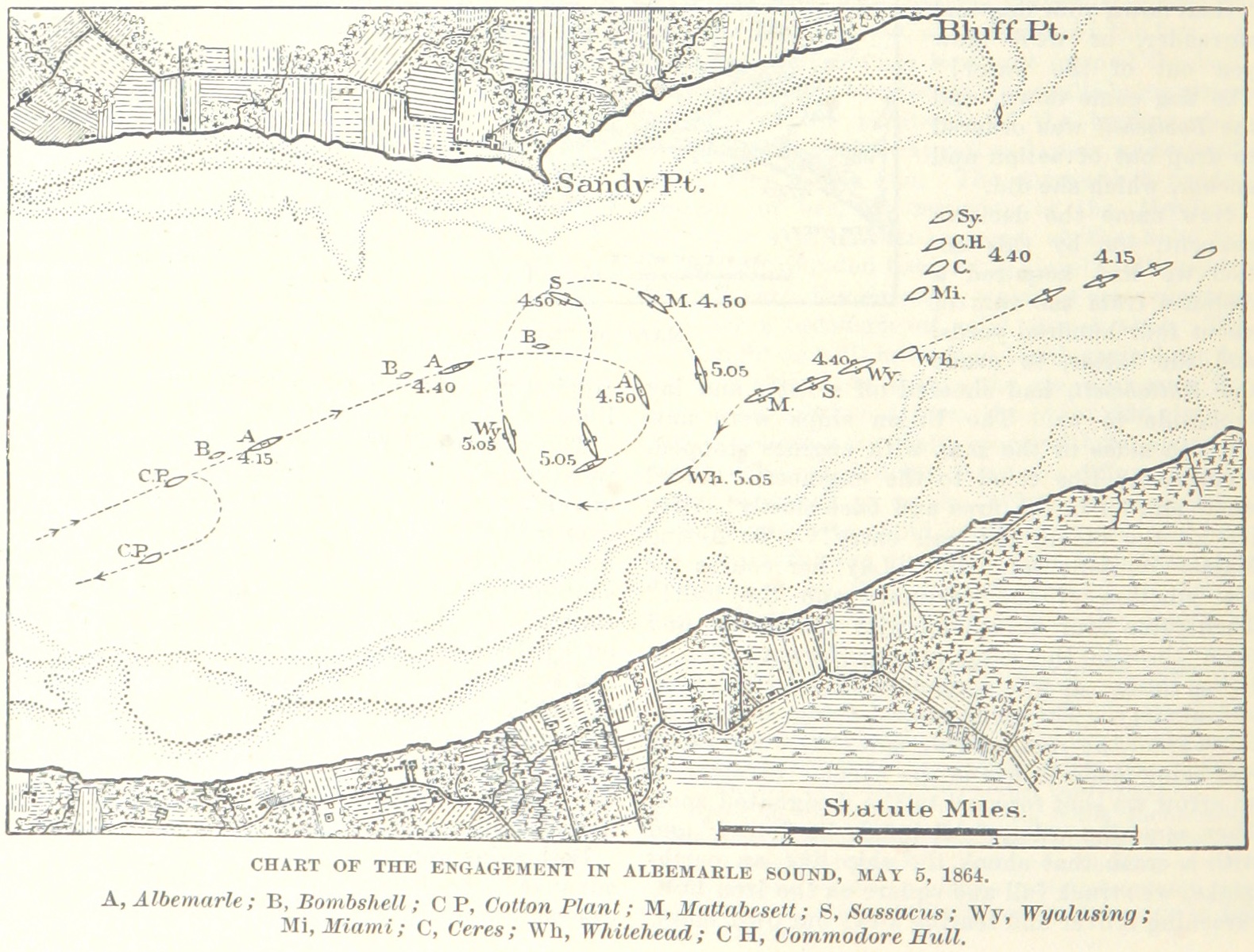
A map of the battle

James W. Cooke, commander of Albemarle sailed out of Plymouth in early May 1864, along with the captured steamer CSS Bombshell and the transport CSS Cotton Plant. Steaming south toward New Bern, Cooke ran into a Union fleet at the mouth of Albemarle Sound, commanded by Captain Melancton Smith. This fleet consisted of the double-ender gunboats USS Mattabasett, USS Sassacus, USS Wyalusing and USS Miami, the converted ferryboat USS Commodore Hull, USS Ceres, USS Whitehead and USS Isaac N. Seymour. When the Confederate ships were spotted, Mattabasett, Sassucus, Whitehead and Wyalusing immediately formed a line of battle supported by Miami, Commodore Hull and Ceres. Albemarle opened fire first, wounding six men working one of Mattabesett's two 100-pounder Parrott rifles. Mattabesset, Whitehead and Wyalusing opened fire almost simultaneously. Albemarle then attempted to ram Mattabesett, but the sidewheeler managed to round the ironclad's armored bow. She was closely followed by Sassacus, which then fired a broadside of solid 9 in (229 mm) and 100-pound shot, all of which bounced off Albemarle's casemate armor. However, Bombshell, being a softer target, was hulled by each heavy shot from Sassucus's broadside and surrendered. Cotton Plant withdrew back up the Roanoke, and Albemarle continued the fight alone.

Smith, despite an advantage in numbers, could do little damage to the single Confederate ship. Shots glanced off Albemarle's sides. Lieutenant Commander Francis Asbury Roe of Sassucus, seeing Albemarle at a range of about 400 yards (370 m), decided to ram. The Union ship struck the Confederate ironclad full and square, broadside-on, shattering the timbers of her own bow, twisting off her own bronze ram in the process, and jamming both ships together. With Sassucus's hull almost touching the end of the ram's Brooke rifle, Albemarle's gun crew quickly fired two point-blank rifled shells, one of them puncturing Sassucus's boilers; though live steam was roaring through the ship, she was able to break away and drift out of range. Sassacus by now was too damaged to function and drifted down river. Miami first tried to use her spar torpedo and then to tangle the Confederate ram's screw propellers and rudder with a seine net, but neither ploy succeeded.

Mattabasett and Wyalusing continued to engage the ram for three hours, until the action was halted by darkness. More than 500 shells were fired at Albemarle during the battle; with visible battle damage to her smokestack and other areas on the ironclad, she steamed back up the Roanoke. The Commodore Hull and Ceres moved to the river's mouth to try and keep the Albemarle from re-entering the sound.

== Aftermath ==
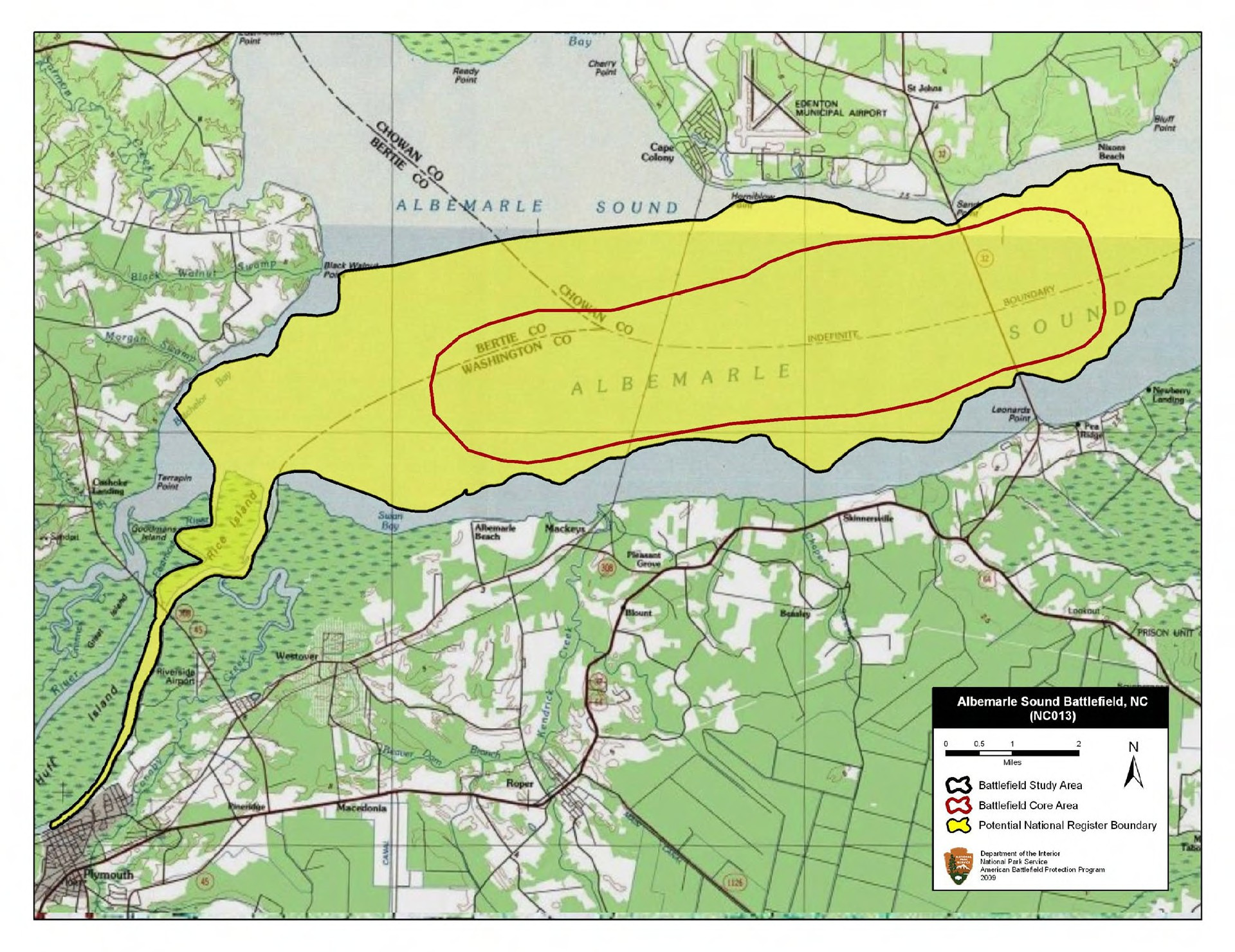
Map of Albemarle Sound Battlefield core and study areas by the American Battlefield Protection Program.

The battle itself was a standoff, but the events that followed had more decisive results. Albemarle had held its own against greater numbers but the damages caused the during the battle had forced the ship into port for the next several months, preventing it from being used in General Hoke's planned assault on New Bern. Hoke went ahead with his campaign even without Albemarle. He achieved nothing before being recalled to Virginia to help defend Petersburg and Richmond. The events in October had a greater impact on the situation when William B. Cushing led a naval raid and detonated a torpedo beneath the Albermarle's hull. The removal of Hoke's force and the destruction of Albemarle allowed both Plymouth and Washington, North Carolina, to fall back into Union hands

== Order of battle ==
=== Union Navy ===
Captain Melancton Smith

- USS Commodore Hull
- USS Ceres
- USS Miami
- USS Wyalusing
- USS Sassacus
- USS Mattabesett - flagship
- USS Whitehead
- USS Isaac N. Seymour
- Ida May (transport)

=== Confederate Mosquito Fleet ===
Commander James W. Cooke

- CSS Albemarle
- CSS Bombshell
- CSS Cotton Plant
