= John Carson Febiger =

United States Navy admiral

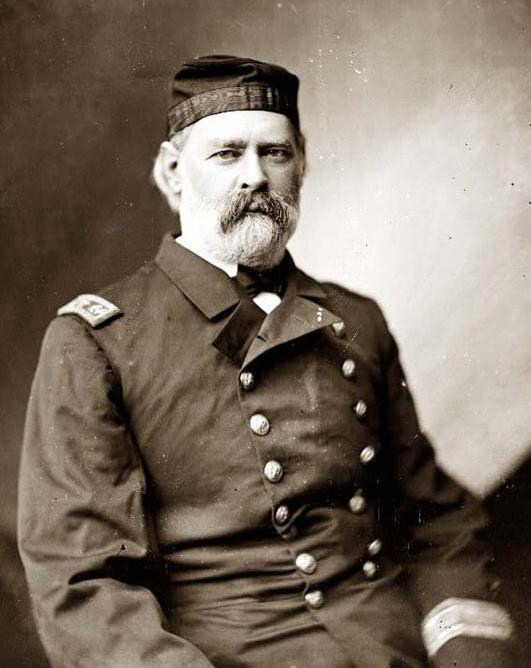
- Admiral Febiger ca. 1863
- Born: February 14, 1821; Pittsburgh, Pennsylvania, US
- Died: October 9, 1898 (aged 77); Easton, Maryland, US
- Burial place: Arlington National Cemetery
- Relatives: Christian Febiger, Dr. John Carson (physician)
- Military career
- Allegiance: United States of America
- Branch: United States Navy
- Service years: 1838–1882
- Rank: Rear admiral
- Commands: Kanawha; Mattabesett; Ashuelot
- Conflicts: American Civil War

John Carson Febiger (14 February 1821 – 9 October 1898) was a rear admiral of the United States Navy who served with the Union Navy during the American Civil War.

== Biography ==
Febiger's father was the adopted son of American Revolutionary War soldier Christian Febiger. Febiger entered the United States Navy from Ohio as a midshipman on 14 September 1838, and was in the Concord, of the Brazil Squadron, when she was wrecked in the Mozambique Channel off the eastern coast of Africa on 2 October 1842. He became passed midshipman on 20 May 1844, and lieutenant on 30 April 1853. He was on the Germantown of the East India Squadron 1858–1860, and on the sloop Savannah in 1861.

On 11 August 1862, he was commissioned commander, and assigned to the steamer Kanawha of the Western Gulf Blockading Squadron. After commanding various vessels in that and the Mississippi River Squadron, in 1864 he was given the Mattabesett, of the North Atlantic Squadron. In that steamer on 5 May 1864, he took part in the fight between the little fleet of wooden vessels under Capt. Melancton Smith, and the Confederate ram CSS Albemarle, in Albemarle Sound, North Carolina In this engagement the ram was defeated, and her tender, the CSS Bombshell, captured, and Febiger was commended for his "gallantry and skill" by Capt. Smith and Rear Admiral Samuel P. Lee.

He commanded the gunboat Ashuelot, of the Asiatic Squadron 1866–1868, and on 6 May 1868 was promoted to captain. He was inspector of naval reserve lands 1869–1872, was made commodore on 9 August 1874, was a member of the Board of Examiners 1874–1876, and commandant of the Washington Navy Yard 1876–1880. He was promoted to rear admiral on 4 February 1882, and on 1 July 1882 was retired on his own application, having been in the service over forty years.

Febiger is buried in Arlington National Cemetery.
