= USS Sassacus (1862) =

Gunboat of the United States Navy

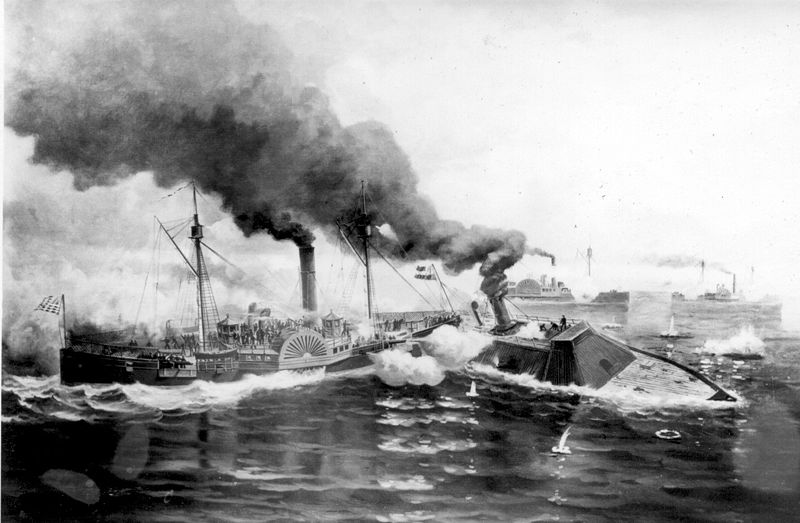
- USS Sassacus ramming CSS Albemarle, 5 May 1864

History

United States
- Launched: 23 December 1862
- Commissioned: 5 October 1863
- Decommissioned: 13 May 1865
- Fate: Sold 28 August 1868

General characteristics
- Class & type: Sassacus-class gunboat
- Displacement: 974 tons
- Length: 205 ft (62 m)
- Beam: 35 ft (11 m)
- Draught: 9 ft (2.7 m)
- Propulsion: Steam engine
- Speed: 14.5 knots (26.9 km/h; 16.7 mph)
- Complement: 145 officers and men
- Armament: 2 100 pounder Parrott rifles, 4 9" Dahlgren smoothbore cannons, 2 24 pounder howitzers, 1 12 pounder rifled cannon, 1 heavy 12 pounder smoothbore cannon

The first USS Sassacus, a wooden, double-ended, sidewheel steamer in commission in the United States Navy from 1863 to 1865. She saw service in the American Civil War.

== Construction and commissioning ==
Sassacus was launched on 23 December 1862 by the Portsmouth Naval Shipyard in Kittery, Maine, sponsored by Miss Wilhelmina G. Lambert. Sassacus was commissioned at the Boston Navy Yard in Boston, Massachusetts, on 5 October 1863 with Lieutenant Commander Francis A. Roe in command.

== Operational history ==
=== Blockade duty ===
That day, the new steamer got underway for trials at sea and returned to Boston for repairs. Later, en route to Hampton Roads to join the North Atlantic Blockading Squadron, the ship suffered mechanical difficulty and was detained at the Washington Navy Yard for repairs from 19 November 1863 to 22 January 1864. When she finally reached Hampton Roads late in January, the double-ender was assigned to the outer blockade of Wilmington, North Carolina, and stationed off Cape Lookout Shoals to intercept inward-bound blockade runners attempting to slip through the net of Union ships.

On 1 February, Sassacus found the new and fast steamer, Wild Dayrell, near New Topsail Inlet, North Carolina, where the blockade runner had gone aground and discharged much of her cargo. The Federal double-ender, later aided by USS Florida, tried for three days to refloat the prize. During their efforts to salvage the steamer, the crews were harassed by Confederate riflemen who were eventually driven off by fire from the Union ships. Finally, parties from the blockaders set the ship ablaze and destroyed her by shelling.

At daybreak on 4 February, lookouts on Sassacus spotted black smoke to the northwest, and the double-ender started out in pursuit. About noon, she was within range of the chase and opened fire. The fleeing blockade runner headed for New Inlet, North Carolina, and ran aground. There, her crew set fire to their ship, left her engine running, and fled. A boarding party from Sassacus reached the steamer about one o'clock and found her to be the paddle wheeler Nutfield, inward bound from Bermuda: "one of the last and best steamers out of the Thames."

Sassacus rescued the runner's purser, the sole survivor from one of Nutfield's capsized boats. He reported that during her flight, his ship had jettisoned a battery of eight Whitworth rifled guns and a large quantity of pig lead. Sassacus seized about 600 new rifled muskets from Austria and England which were still on board. Meanwhile, Sassacus and Florida, which again offered assistance, attempted to refloat the prize. When it was evident that the ship could not be freed, the Union sailors set her on fire and riddled her hull with solid shot fired at her waterline.

After learning of Sassacus's performance on blockade duty, her squadron commander, Rear Admiral Samuel Phillips Lee, reported to United States Secretary of the Navy Gideon Welles, "The Sassacus had done well... I congratulate you on the success of this class [of ship]... they'll beat the Clyders.

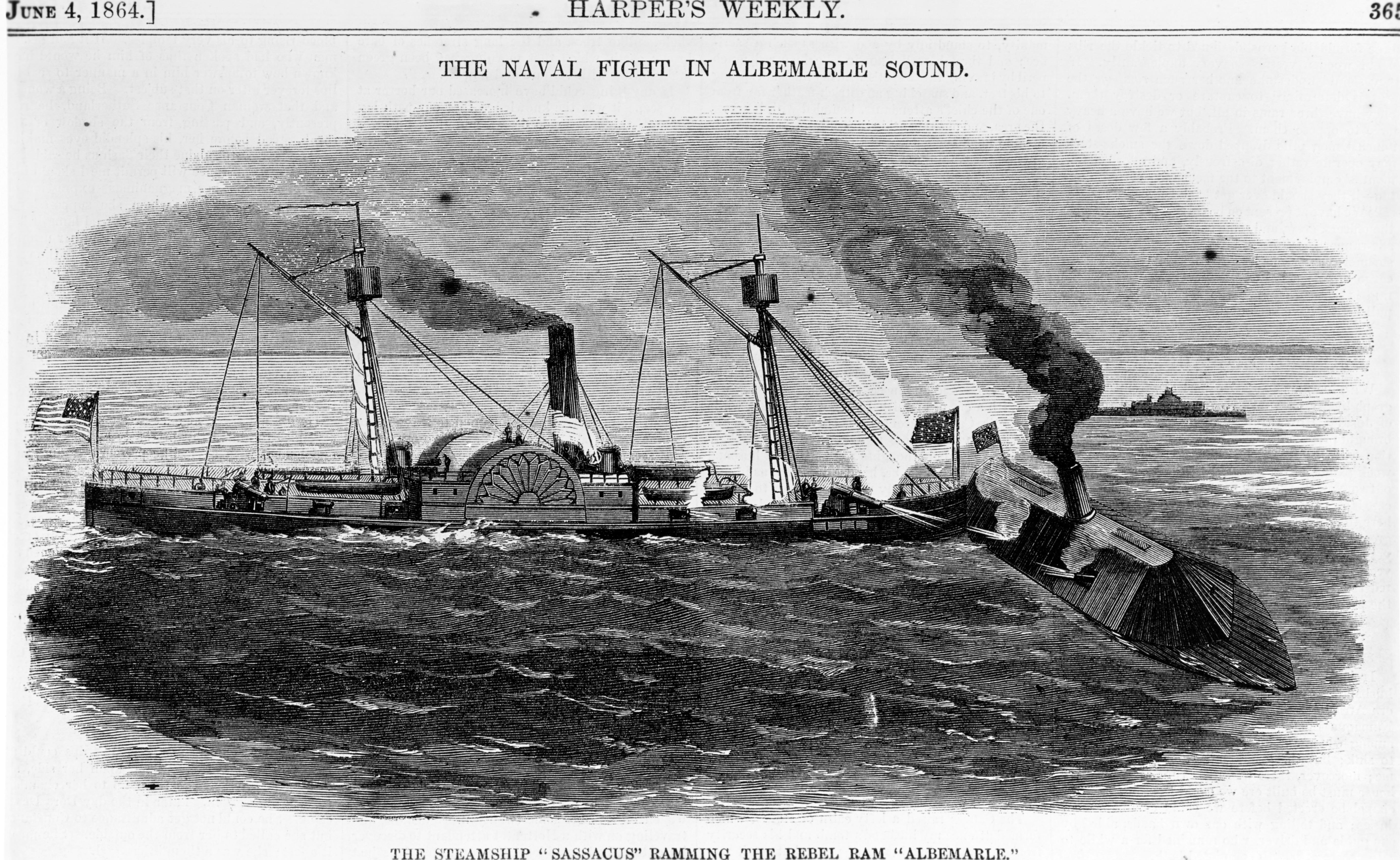
The USS Sassacus rams the CSS Albemarle.

=== Albemarle Sound ===
In March, Sassacus returned to Hampton Roads for repairs and then proceeded to the Washington Navy Yard to add two 12 pounder Dahlgren rifles to her battery. She departed Washington, D.C., on 15 April, and left Hampton Roads a week later for duty in the North Carolina sounds where, on 19 April, the ironclad ram CSS Albemarle had spearheaded a joint Confederate sea/land offensive, sinking Union double-ender USS Southfield, and helping to wrest Plymouth, North Carolina, from Union hands. On 26 April, Sassacus crossed the bar into North Carolina's inland waters and was assigned to Albemarle Sound, where other United States Navy ships awaited the reappearance of the dreaded Southern ram. Albemarle, accompanied by troop-carrying steamers CSS Cotton Plant and CSS Bombshell, reemerged from Roanoke Run on the afternoon of 5 May bent on attacking New Bern, North Carolina. The Union ships in the vicinity slowly fell back while the Union transport Trumpeter raced away to carry word of the Southern ram's advance to Captain Melancton Smith, the senior Union Naval officer in the sounds. Smith in USS Mattabesett, followed by Sassacus, USS Wyalusing and USS Whitehead, immediately got underway and dashed toward Confederate Captain James W. Cooke's little task force. Soon after Albemarle opened fire, Sassacus, Mattabesett and Wyalusing concentrated their fire on Bombshell and forced the little steamer to surrender. Meanwhile, Cotton Plant withdrew up the Roanoke River. Then Commander Roe "ordered full steam and open throttle" and headed Sassacus straight for the ram. Sassacus struck Albemarle's starboard broadside. The double-ender was damaged by the collision and by a shot from the ram which hit her starboard boiler. Escaping steam killed one fireman outright and scalded others who died in the next few days. Albemarle suffered only superficial damage.

For about ten minutes, the ships were locked together and engulfed in steam, while Sassacus attempted to penetrate deeper into her adversary, and Albemarle struggled to pull free. Bluejackets on the double-ender threw grenades at the ironclad's deck hatch despite musketry from the ram. Sassacus starboard wheel spun across Albemarle's stern, badly damaging itself as it smashed a launch and other gear on the ram's deck. In the Union ship's engine room, First Assistant Engineer James H. Hobby, ignoring all-but-lethal burns, struggled to maintain power. As the ram wrenched free, the Federal gunners, blanketed in scalding vapor, manned their pieces and sent salvo after salvo at the tough iron casement which protected the Southern ship.

For more than three hours, the Union warships struggled to destroy Albemarle without seriously damaging their tough-hided opponent. As dusk approached, the ram slipped away from the melee and retired up the Roanoke.

=== James River ===
Sassacus, operating with only jury-rig repairs, remained in the sounds for over six weeks struggling to help maintain the Union's tenuous grasp on eastern North Carolina. Then, steaming stern first to minimize the pressure on her battered bow, she headed for the James River, where Union strength afloat was needed by General Ulysses S. Grant in his drive toward Richmond, Virginia. The ship reached Newport News, Virginia on 22 June. The next day, "although sadly yet honorably mutilated," she ascended the river and reported for duty. The ship operated on the James through the summer, from time to time engaging riflemen along the river banks. In September, she finally sailed north for overdue repairs, reaching Philadelphia, Pennsylvania on 1864-09-06.

=== Fort Fisher ===
Early in November, Sassacus returned to Hampton Roads where preparations were underway for a joint Army-Navy expedition against Fort Fisher, which protected Wilmington, the Confederacy's last major blockade-running center. During the ensuing weeks, the double-ender performed blockade duty off that strategic port and assisted the United States Coast Survey in the vicinity of the mouth of the Cape Fear River to obtain topographic intelligence for the forthcoming operations.

The U.S. Navy had long wanted to move against Wilmington, but the Army had always found other uses for the troops necessary to take that strong Confederate fortification. Army reluctance had been dispelled by Major General Benjamin F. Butler's fascination with a plan to destroy Fort Fisher by detonating an explosive-filled ship as close as possible to the fortress. Although Union naval leaders had little faith in the effectiveness of this plan, they readily cooperated in its implementation, hoping to thereby secure Army cooperation.

The screw steamer Louisiana was selected as the powder ship, taken to Hampton Roads, stripped, and partially laden with explosives. On 13 December, Sassacus took Louisiana into tow and pulled her to Beaufort, North Carolina where she took on additional explosives. Sassacus, accompanied by Admiral David Dixon Porter's fleet, then got underway and towed the fully loaded Louisiana to the mouth of the Cape Fear, arriving off Fort Fisher on 18 December. There, for five days, bad weather prevented USS Wilderness from towing the giant bomb into position for detonation. Finally, on the night of 23–24 December, Wilderness managed to get Louisiana within 200 to 300 yards of the shore. At 1:18 am, a great blast shook and lighted the area for many miles, but left Fort Fisher undamaged.

The task of leveling the Confederate works was left to naval gunfire, and Sassacus readily joined in the bombardment which began at daylight on Christmas Eve and was maintained throughout the day. That night, the wooden ships withdrew to anchor in deeper waters, and Porter's ironclads continued harassing fire during the darkness. On Christmas morning, the wooden ships reformed their battle line and opened fire at 10:30. In the afternoon, troops landed; but, after receiving a pessimistic report on a reconnaissance of the fortress, General Butler ordered his troops to reembark on their transports. During the next two days, while laboring to return the last of the troops to ships, Sassacus's launch and second cutter were both damaged in the heavy surf, abandoned on the beach under orders from Brigadier General Newton Martin Curtis, and later destroyed.

Disappointed by Butler's indecisive leadership, Admiral Porter managed to get General Grant to commit the Army to a prompt return to Fort Fisher. The new task force, containing a reinforced Army contingent commanded by Major General Alfred Terry, arrived at Beaufort on 8 January 1865 but was held up there by bad weather. The ships got underway again on 12 January.

The next day, Sassacus joined in the pre-invasion bombardment, and then, as her boats were landing troops, shelled the woods ahead of the Union skirmish line. On 14 January, she continued the barrage while her boats and working parties landed artillery and provisions for the Army and also helped to replenish the monitors' magazines.

On 15 January, the ship landed a party of 37 volunteers from her crew to join a naval assault force. Although Confederate defenders repulsed the ensuing spirited attack by sailors and marines storming Fort Fisher's seaward wall, in doing so, they neglected to defend adequately the opposite side of the stronghold and allowed Terry's troops to enter from the beach along the Cape Fear. That night, after the Southern garrison had surrendered, two men of the Sassacus party were killed by a magazine explosion, swelling the double-ender's casualty list for the operation to three killed and three wounded.

=== Late and post war service ===
For more than a month, Sassacus fought with Porter against Southern fortifications up the Cape Fear, and was on hand for the fall of Fort Anderson and Fort Strong. During operations against the latter, she was hit three times, once by a shot below her waterline which caused heavy leaking. Late in February, the durable double-ender was ordered back to the James River to support Grant as he closed his stranglehold on the southern capital. After the Confederacy collapsed, Sassacus cruised in the Chesapeake Bay to prevent any possible attempt of conspirators in the assassination of President Abraham Lincoln to escape by sea. Upon her return to Hampton Roads on 2 May, the ship, in need of extensive repairs, was ordered north. She sailed for Philadelphia on the evening of 4 May. Sassacus was decommissioned and was laid up at the Philadelphia Navy Yard on 13 May 1865. She was sold there on 28 August 1868 to John Roach.

== See also ==
- Union Navy
- Ships captured in the American Civil War
