= USS Miami (1861) =

American side-wheel steamer gunboat

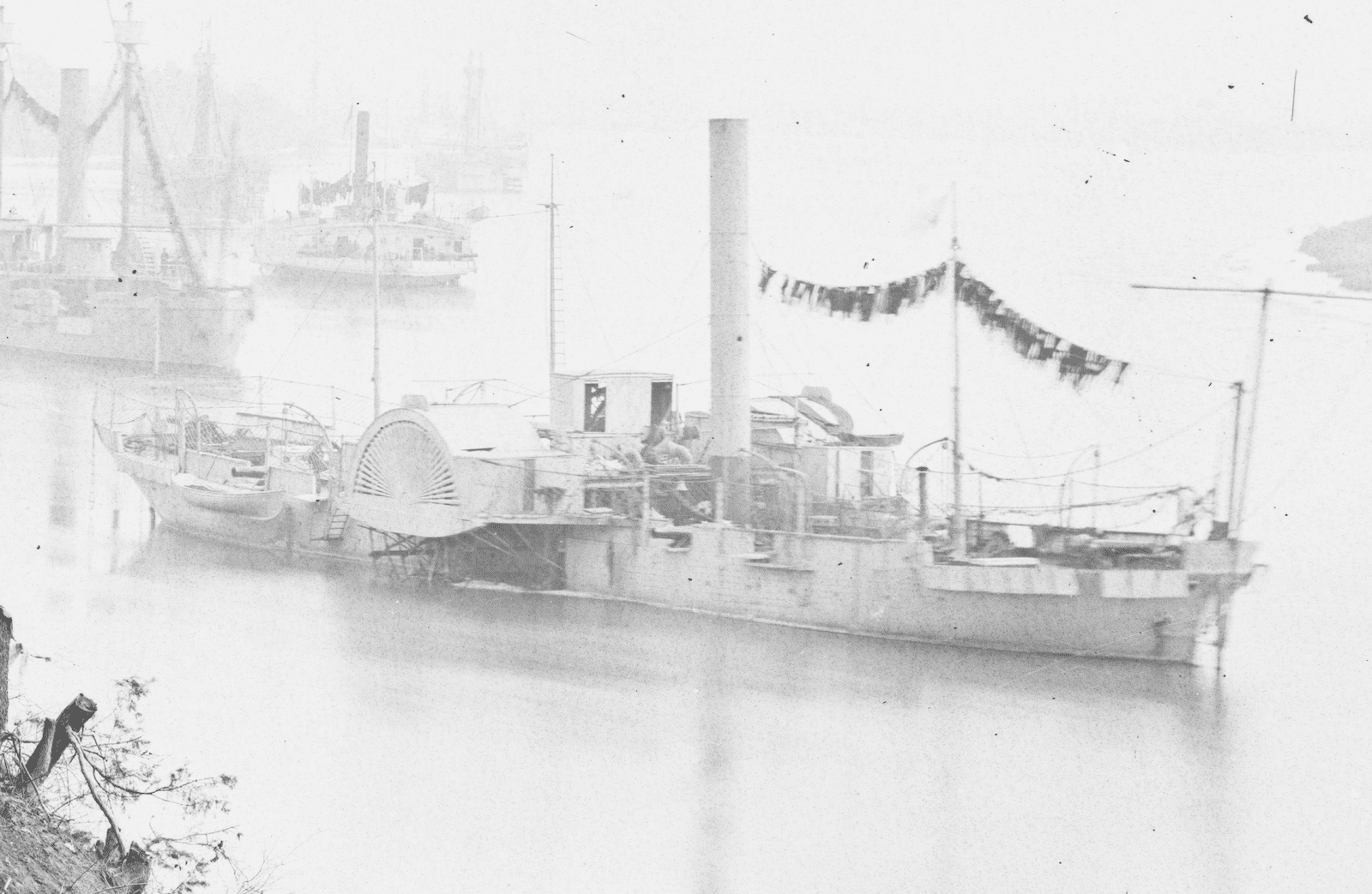
- USS Miami at anchor on the James River, Virginia.

History

United States
- Name: USS Miami
- Builder: Philadelphia Navy Yard
- Launched: 16 November 1861
- Commissioned: 29 January 1862
- Decommissioned: 22 May 1865
- Fate: Sold at auction, 10 August 1865; Merchant steamer until 1869

General characteristics
- Type: Sidewheel gunboat
- Displacement: 730 long tons (742 t)
- Length: 208 ft 2 in (63.45 m)
- Beam: 33 ft 2 in (10.11 m)
- Draft: 8 ft 6 in (2.59 m)
- Propulsion: Steam engine
- Speed: 8 knots (15 km/h; 9.2 mph)
- Complement: 134 officers and men
- Armament: 1 × 100-pounder Parrott rifle; 1 × 9 in (230 mm) smoothbore Dahlgren gun; 4 × 24-pounder guns

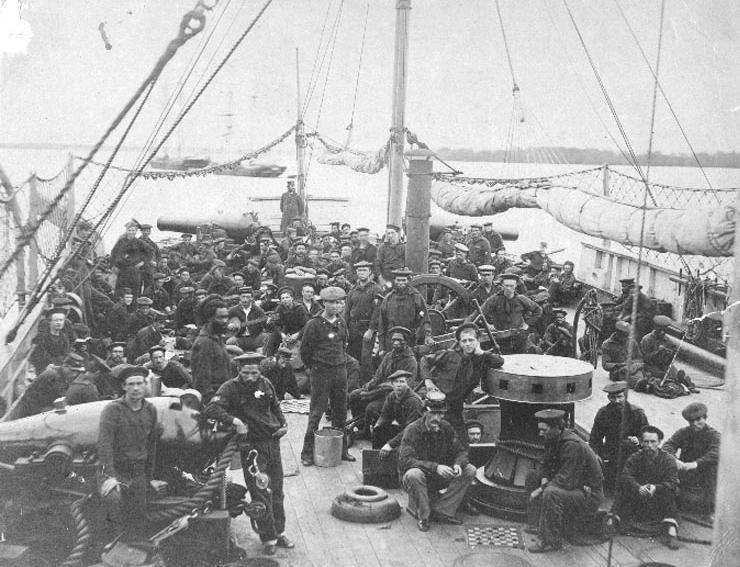
Crew of the USS Miami, circa 1864

The first USS Miami was a side-wheel steamer, double-ender gunboat in the United States Navy during the American Civil War.

Miami was launched by Philadelphia Navy Yard on November 16, 1861, and commissioned there on January 29, 1862, Lieutenant Abram Davis Harrell in command.

== Service history ==
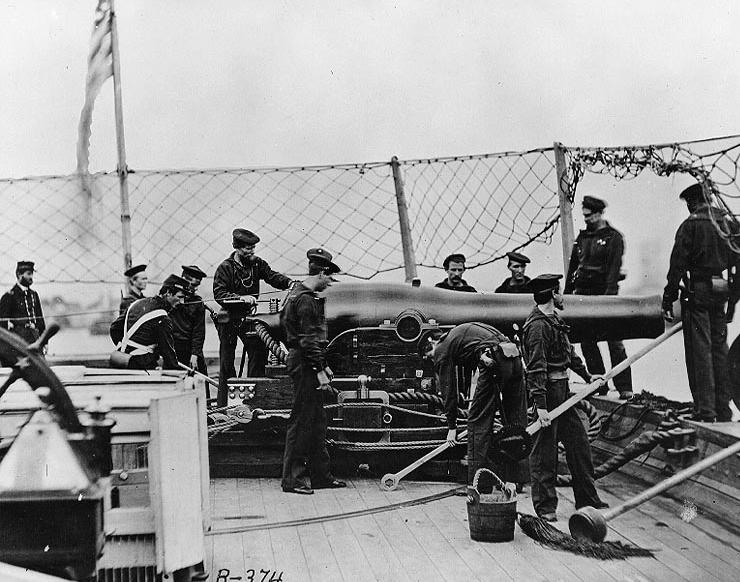
A 9" Dahlgren smoothbore cannon on the deck of USS Miami (Photograph by Mathew Brady)

=== Battle of New Orleans ===
The wooden-hulled gunboat was ordered February 5, 1862, to proceed to Ship Island, Mississippi for duty in the Mortar Flotilla organized to neutralize Confederate riverside forts during Admiral David Farragut's impending attack on New Orleans, Louisiana. Miami reached Ship Island on March 19 and headed for Pass a l'Outre where she entered the Mississippi River to join Commander David Dixon Porter's flotilla.

During the next few weeks she was busy preparing for the assault. On April 13, Miami joined Westfield, Clifton, Oneida, and Harriet Lane and steamed upstream. A Confederate steamer exchanged fire with Union ships before scurrying upriver to safety. Early in the morning, five days later, Miami towed three mortar schooners to predesignated positions below Fort St. Philip and Fort Jackson when the Union ships bombarded the Confederate works which guarded the approach to New Orleans. The shelling continued intermittently until it reached crescendo before dawn on April 24 as Admiral Farragut led his deep draft, salt water fleet up the Mississippi in a daring dash past the forts.

Miami remained below with the mortar schooners providing covering fire for Farragut's ships as they ran the gauntlet. When the Federal vessels had reached safety, Miami turned to transporting U.S. Army troops to positions for launching an attack on the forts by land, and continued the task until the forts surrendered to the Navy on April 28.

Farragut ordered the Mortar Flotilla to Ship Island on May 1 to prepare for action against Mobile, Alabama. Porter left Ship Island with his steamers and Sachem on May 7 for Mobile Bay to prepare for an attack. After planting buoys to mark safe channels for Farragut's deep-draft ships, the steamers returned to Ship Island. On May 10 Porter, who had remained off Mobile on blockade duty, reoccupied Pensacola, Florida after it bad been burned and abandoned by Confederate troops. Although most military and naval installations in the area had been destroyed or severely damaged by thorough Southern demolition work, Porter recognized the strategic advantages of Pensacola as a naval base and shifted his flotilla there from Ship Island.

=== Vicksburg Campaign ===
Meanwhile, Farragut, upon returning from a daring expedition up the Mississippi River to Vicksburg, Mississippi had received "stringent orders to send a large force up the river" to join forces with Admiral Charles Henry Davis' western flotilla in clearing the entire Mississippi Valley. He accordingly sent for Porter's mortar schooners to shell the heights of Vicksburg which could not be reached by his flotilla's guns.

Miami reached New Orleans on June 7 and spent the following fortnight towing schooners upriver. She reached Vicksburg on June 21 for a week's service moving schooners in and out of firing positions and shelling the cliffside batteries herself. On June 28 her guns engaged the Confederate cannon while Farragut's ships ran by the Vicksburg batteries to join the armed riverboats of Admiral Davis' Western Flotilla. The joining of the salt water and fresh water squadrons buoyed morale throughout the North, but the strategic potential of the feat was largely nullified by a lack of ground forces to take and hold key points along the river. Farragut returned to the lower river on July 15.

Miami departed Ship Island on September 1 and arrived at Fort Monroe on September 9. After two months devoted to reconnaissance duty up the James River, blockade duty in Hampton Roads, and refitting, Miami got underway from Norfolk, Virginia on November 9 and entered the North Carolina sounds the following day. There she helped enforce the blockade, deterred Confederate military activity and gathered intelligence.

=== Action against CSS Albemarle ===
In an effort to counter the effect of Union naval superiority in the sounds, the Confederacy constructed a number of ironclads in North Carolina. One, CSS Albemarle, built at Scotland Neck, North Carolina, afforded Miami the highlight of her service in the sounds. On April 17, 1864, Confederate troops launched a sustained attack on Plymouth, North Carolina. Union gunboats moved to support their troops ashore and were promptly taken under fire by the Southern batteries. Next day, the fighting at Plymouth intensified as the Confederates pressed the assault. Union Army steamer USS Bombshell was sunk during the engagement, but by 9:00 PM, the Southern advance had been halted.

Lieutenant Commander Charles W. Flusser reported: "The Southfield and Miami took part and the general says our firing was admirable." The southern attack required naval support in order to achieve success, and Flusser added meaningfully: "The ram will be down tonight or tomorrow."

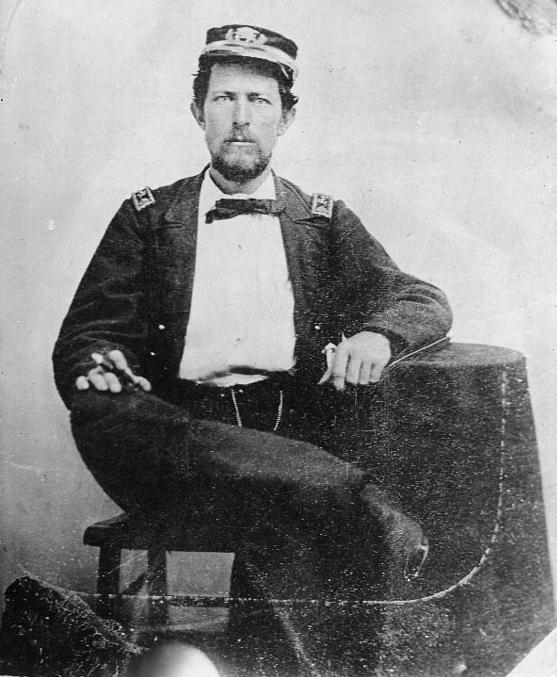
Lieutenant Commander Charles W. Flusser, USN, killed in action commanding USS Miami on April 19, 1864

Confederate ironclad Albemarle had departed Hamilton, North Carolina on the evening of April 17, and anchored above Plymouth the following night. Shortly after midnight on April 19, Albemarle weighed anchor and stood down to engage. Meanwhile, anticipating an attack by the ram, Lieutenant Commander Flusser lashed Miami and Southfield together for mutual protection and concentration of firepower. As Albemarle appeared, he gallantly headed the two light wooden ships directly at the southern ram, firing as they approached. Albemarle struck Southfield a devastating blow with her ram. It was reported that she "tore a hole clear through to the boiler" and Albemarle's captain stated that his ship plunged 10 feet into the side of the wooden gunboat. Though backing immediately after the impact, Albemarle could not at once wrench herself free from the sinking Southfield, and thus could not reply effectively to the fire poured into her by Miami. At last her prow was freed as Southfield sank, and Albemarle forced Flusser's ship to withdraw under a heavy cannonade. Small steamer Ceres and tinclad Whitehead moved downriver also. The shot of the Union ships had been ineffective against the heavily plated, sloping sides of the ram.

Early in the engagement, Lieutenant Commander Flusser had been killed. Brigadier General Henry Walton Wessels, commanding Union troops at Plymouth, noted: "In the death of this accomplished sailor the Navy has lost one of its brightest ornaments...."

Albemarle now controlled the water approaches to Plymouth and rendered invaluable support to Confederate States Army moves ashore, giving the South a taste of the priceless advantage Union armies enjoyed in all theaters throughout the war. On April 20, Plymouth fell to the southern attack. On May 5, Miami and other Union ships engaged Albemarle again at the Battle of Albemarle Sound. The battle was inconclusive; the Albemarle and USS Sassacus were both damaged, and the CSS Bombshell (the former USS Bombshell) was captured. Albemarle's threat to Union naval supremacy in North Carolina waters was ended October 27 when Lieutenant William B. Cushing exploded a spar torpedo under the ironclad's overhanging armor, tearing a hole in her wooden hull.

=== The drive on Richmond ===
Shifting to the James River to support General Ulysses S. Grant's drive on Richmond, Virginia, Miami engaged Confederate batteries at Wilcox's Landing, Virginia. Proceeding toward heavy firing, Miami had discovered batteries at Wilcox's Landing firing on Union transports. She immediately open a brisk cannonade, and after an hour the Confederates withdrew. Next day, Miami, accompanied by Osceola, drove off batteries which were firing on another group of transports near Harrison's Landing, Virginia on the James River. Throughout the embattled South, Union gunboats kept communications and supply lines open despite the efforts of the Confederates to sever them.

For the remainder of the war, Miami operated in the James River now commanded by Lt. George W Graves, playing an important role in the naval effort, assisting Grant's unrelenting pressures on the Confederate capitol which finally forced Lee to surrender at Appomattox Courthouse, Virginia on April 9, 1865.

The double-ender decommissioned at Philadelphia, Pennsylvania on May 22, 1865, and was sold at auction in Philadelphia on August 10, 1865. Miami served American commerce until 1869.

== See also ==
- Blockade runners of the American Civil War
- Union Navy
- Confederate Navy
