= John Carson (physician) =

American physician

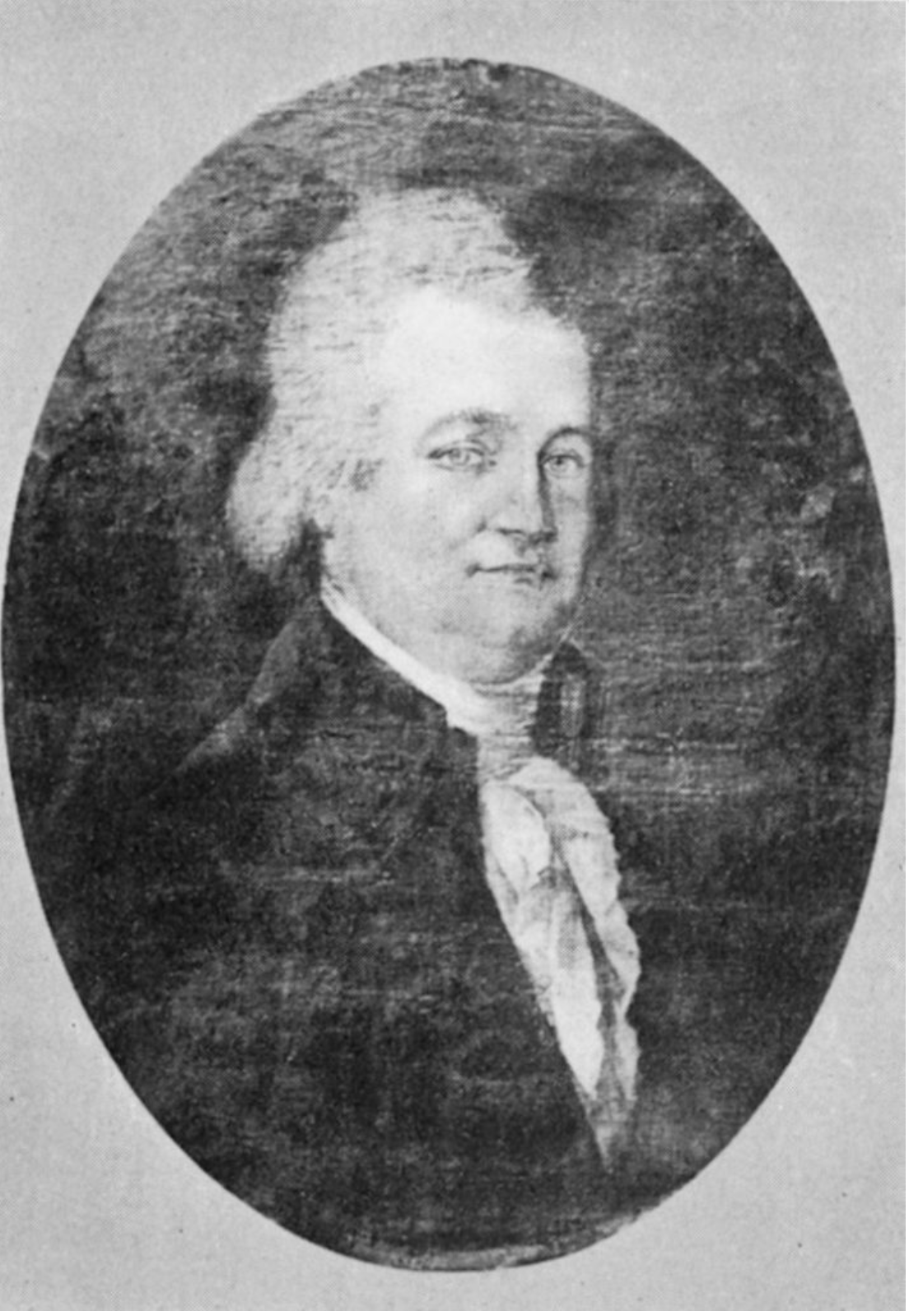
- Born: November 12, 1752; Philadelphia, Pennsylvania
- Died: October 26, 1794 (aged 41); Philadelphia, Pennsylvania
- Resting place: Mount Vernon Cemetery (Philadelphia)
- Occupation: Medical Doctor
- Known for: Original Trustee, University of Pennsylvania

John Carson (November 12, 1752 – October 26, 1794, was an early American physician and one the first trustees for the rechartered University of Pennsylvania. He later was appointed chair of the university's Chemistry Department.

== Early life and education ==
Carson was born in Philadelphia, the son of William Carson and Mary Hamilton, who emigrated earlier from County Antrim in Northern Ireland. In Philadelphia, William was innkeeper of the "Harp and Crown," a trustee of the Second Presbyterian Church, and a Committee of Safety and militia member during the American Revolutionary War. John was an early student at the Academy and College of Philadelphia, which was founded in 1751 by several prominent local citizens, including Benjamin Franklin. He later graduated from the College of Philadelphia in 1771. Both institutions were precursors for what would become the University of Pennsylvania. Carson then attended the University of Edinburgh in Scotland, where he earned his M.D. in 1776 before returning to Philadelphia to practice medicine.

One of six children, John's sister, Elizabeth Carson, married the noted Revolutionary War hero Colonel Christian Febiger. Christian and Elizabeth had no children of their own, and adopted John's son by his Scottish wife, Agnes Hunter (Christian Carson, later changed his name to Christian Carson Febiger, father of Admiral John Carson Febiger). His other sister, Mary Carson, married another military hero, General James O'Hara (quartermaster), who later served as Quartermaster General of the U.S. Army. Both Febiger and O'Hara met their future wives at William Carson's "Harp & Crown" tavern.

== Career ==
Following his medical school graduation, Carson remained in Edinburgh for some time and married. He later returned to his native Philadelphia, where he ran a sizable private practice and also assisted in setting up the Philadelphia Dispensary. In 1787, Carson was an original incorporator and Fellow of The College of Physicians of Philadelphia, where he was a contemporary of, and frequent correspondent with, Benjamin Rush. In that same year, he was also named Surgeon of the First Troop Philadelphia City Cavalry. Carson was also elected a member of the American Philosophical Society, the Hibernian Society of Philadelphia, and Deputy Grand Master of the Masonic Grand Lodge of Pennsylvania.

In 1791, he was named to the Board of Trustees of his alma mater, the College of Philadelphia. In this role, he helped oversee the merger of the college with the University of the State of Pennsylvania, which created the University of Pennsylvania. Following the creation of the new university, Carson was chosen to stay on as a trustee, a service he performed until 1794. That year, he resigned to become chairman of chemistry at the university's medical school, which was left vacant by the death of James Hutchinson.

== Death ==
Carson died on October 26, 1794, in Philadelphia, at age 41, from a peritonsillar abscess and was never able to formally assume the duties at the University of Pennsylvania School of Medicine.

Carson was originally buried at the Arch Street Second Presbyterian Church Cemetery, but his remains were removed to Mount Vernon Cemetery in 1864 when the Arch Street Cemetery closed. His wife, Agnes, returned to Scotland following his death. Carson fathered ten children. Several of Carson's later relatives went on to have long-standing affiliations with the University of Pennsylvania, including physician and botanist Joseph Carson, attorney Hampton L. Carson, and evolutionary biologist Hampton L. Carson.
