= USS Mattabesett (1863) =

Gunboat of the United States Navy

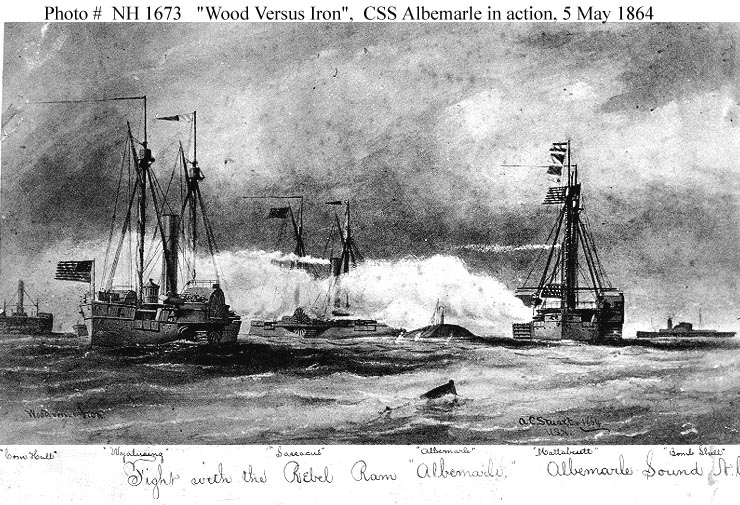
- The Battle of Albemarle Sound. Mattabesett is second from right

History

United States
- Name: USS Mattabesett
- Builder: A. & G. T. Sampson, Boston, Massachusetts
- Laid down: 1862
- Launched: 1863
- Commissioned: 7 April 1864
- Decommissioned: 31 May 1865
- Fate: Sold, 15 October 1865

General characteristics
- Class & type: Sassacus-class gunboat
- Displacement: 1,173 long tons (1,192 t)
- Length: 205 ft (62 m)
- Beam: 35 ft (11 m)
- Draft: 8 ft 6 in (2.59 m)
- Installed power: 1 × 712 ihp inclined direct-acting steam engine, auxiliary sails
- Propulsion: 2 × sidewheels
- Sail plan: Schooner-rigged
- Speed: 14 knots (26 km/h; 16 mph)
- Complement: 100 officers and enlisted
- Armament: 2 × 100-pounder (45 kg) Parrott rifles; 4 × 9 in (230 mm) smoothbore Dahlgren guns; 4 × 24-pounder (11 kg) guns; 1 × 12-pounder (5 kg) smoothbore gun; 1 × 12-pounder (5 kg) rifled gun

USS Mattabesett, sometimes spelled Mattabeset, a schooner-rigged, wooden hulled, double-ended sidewheel gunboat, was built by A. & G. T. Sampson, Boston, Massachusetts, and named for the Mattabesset River in Connecticut. Mattabesett was delivered to the New York Navy Yard on January 18, 1864, and commissioned April 7, 1864, Commander John C. Febiger in command.

== Service history ==
Mattabesett departed New York on April 21, 1864, for duty in the North Atlantic Blockading Squadron and arrived at Hampton Roads on April 23 as escort to USS Onondaga. Continuing down the coast to enter the North Carolina Sounds, she took part in an engagement between Union forces and the Confederate ram CSS Albemarle, accompanied by CSS Bombshell and CSS Cotton Plant, off the mouth of the Roanoke River on May 5. In the course of the battle, leading to the capture of Plymouth, North Carolina by Confederate forces, Mattabesett, with USS Sassacus, captured Bombshell, but Albemarle and Cotton Plant escaped.

But for a brief trip to New York in the fall of 1864, Mattabesett continued to serve the North Atlantic Blockading Squadron for the remainder of the U.S. Civil War, operating primarily in the inland waters of North Carolina. She sailed north in May 1865, decommissioned at New York on May 31, and was sold there on October 15.

== See also ==
Ships captured in the American Civil War
