= CSS Cotton Plant =

History

Confederate States
- Name: Cotton Plant
- Launched: 1860
- Commissioned: 1861
- Decommissioned: May 1885
- Fate: Surrendered to United States

General characteristics
- Displacement: 85 tons
- Length: 107 ft (33 m)
- Beam: 18 ft 9 in (5.72 m)
- Draft: 4 ft 5 in (1.35 m)
- Propulsion: Steam engine

CSS Cotton Plant, sometimes referred to as Cotton Planter, was built at Philadelphia, Pennsylvania in 1860 and reportedly carried troops in the Pamlico River as early as September 1861. She sailed with CSS Albemarle when that ironclad ram attacked Union forces at Plymouth, North Carolina, sank USS Southfield and drove off USS Miami, USS Ceres and USS Whitehead on April 18–19, 1864. On May 5, 1864, she steamed as convoy to Albemarle from the Roanoke River en route to the Alligator River. The convoy was engaged by ships of the North Atlantic Blockading Squadron in the Battle of Albemarle Sound, but both the ram and Cotton Plant with several launches in tow escaped into the Roanoke River.

In May 1865, Cotton Plant was surrendered to Union officials near Halifax, North Carolina by parties claiming that she had been appropriated by Confederate authorities. Ownership was adjudicated at Plymouth and she was turned over to the U.S. Treasury purchasing agent to transport cotton and provisions. She was later delivered to the U.S. Navy at Norfolk, Virginia.
