= Allexander Hand =

U.S. Navy American Civil War Medal of Honor recipient

- Born: c. 1836
- Military career
- Allegiance: United States
- Branch: Navy
- Rank: Quartermaster
- Unit: (United States Navy) USS Ceres
- Commands: U.S.S. Ceres
- Awards: Medal of Honor

Allexander Hand (born c. 1836) was a quartermaster in the US Navy for the Union during the American Civil War who received the Medal of Honor. Prior to the Civil War, he resided in Delaware. During the Civil War, while serving aboard the USS Ceres, in a fight near Hamilton on the Roanoke River, Hand was fired upon by the enemy with small arms, and "courageously returned the raking enemy fire." His commanding officer later spoke for his "good conduct and cool bravery under enemy fire," which led to him receiving the Medal of Honor.

== See also ==
- USS Ceres
- Hamilton, North Carolina
- Anaconda Plan
- Blockade runner
