= Henry Wilkes =

American sailor (c.1845–1888)

Henry Wilkes (c. 1845 – March 3, 1888) was an American sailor who was awarded the Medal of Honor for actions in the American Civil War.

== Biography ==
Wilkes was born in about 1845 in New York, New York. He joined the U.S Navy as a landsman during the Civil War and served aboard U.S. Picket Boat No. 1 which is famed for the sinking of Confederate vessel CSS Albemarle. He earned his medal during the picket boats raid on the Albemarle on the night of October 27, 1864 near Plymouth, North Carolina. Following this action he was taken prisoner. Not much is known following this except the fact that he died in Rensselaer, New York on March 3, 1888. He is now buried in Beverwyck Cemetery in Rensselaer, New York.

== Medal of Honor Citation ==
For extraordinary heroism in action while serving on board U.S. Picket Boat No.1 in action, 27 October 1864, against the Confederate Ram, Albemarle, which had resisted repeated attacks by our steamers and had kept a large force of vessels employed in watching her. The picket boat, equipped with a spar torpedo, succeeded in passing the enemy pickets within 20 yards without being discovered and then made for the Albemarle under a full head of steam. Immediately taken under fire by the ram, the small boat plunged on, jumped the log boom which encircled the target and exploded its torpedo under the port bow of the ram. The picket boat was destroyed by enemy fire and almost the entire crew taken prisoner or lost.
