= Melancton Smith (admiral) =

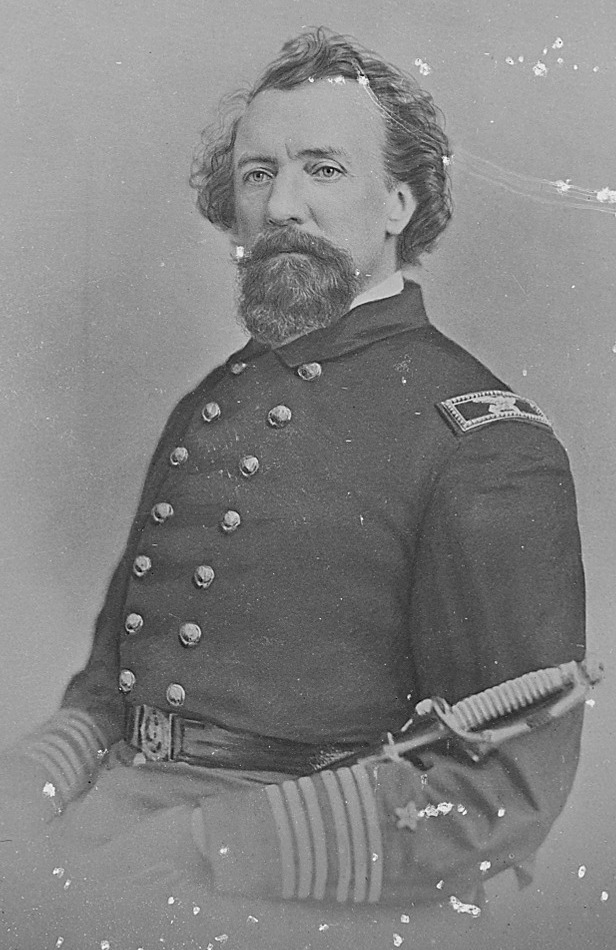
- Born: May 24, 1810; New York City, New York
- Died: July 19, 1893 (aged 83); Green Bay, Wisconsin
- Military career
- Allegiance: United States of America; Union
- Branch: United States Navy; Union Navy
- Service years: 1826–1871
- Rank: Rear admiral
- Commands: USS Massachusetts; USS Wabash
- Conflicts: Seminole Wars; American Civil War

Melancton Smith (May 24, 1810 – July 19, 1893) was a United States Navy officer who served during the Seminole Wars and the American Civil War.

== Early life ==
Melancton Smith III was born in Jamaica, Long Island in New York, the son of Col. Melancton Smith, Jr., an army officer during the War of 1812, and grandson of Melancton Smith, a Continental Congressman. The third Melancton joined the U.S. Navy at a young age.

== Civil War service ==
At the outbreak of the American Civil War Smith commanded the Massachusetts and on June 9, 1861, he captured the British blockade runner Perthshire with a cargo of cotton near Pensacola, Florida. He also took part in the battles for Forts Jackson and St. Philip in April 1862. He was appointed captain and took part in the naval part of the Siege of Port Hudson from May to July, 1863. Smith was senior naval officer of a small fleet in Albemarle Sound, where he attacked the Confederate ram CSS Albemarle at the Battle of Albemarle Sound in May 1864.

He described the havoc caused by one well-placed shot with the Massachusetts rifled pivot gun, at the CSS Selma in October 1861 thusly:

It entered the starboard side abaft the engine five feet above the water line, cutting entirely through 18 planks of the main deck, carried away the table, sofas, eight sections of iron steam pipe, and exploded in the stateroom on the port side, stripping the bulkheads of four rooms, and setting fire to the vessel ... 12 pieces of the fragments have been collected and weigh 58 pounds.

He commanded the frigate Wabash during both attacks on Fort Fisher in December 1864 and January 1865. In Rear Admiral David Dixon Porter's Report to the U.S. Navy, dated January 28, 1865, from his flagship Malvern, on the Cape Fear River, in commendation of officers of his command the North Atlantic Squadron, the following was written about Melancton Smith:

Captain Melancton Smith, in the Wabash, has performed his duty well. He has also made a good record at the Department, and has been actively engaged in fighting since the rebellion first broke out. His old ship has done good service here, and if he had done nothing more than assist, as he has done in the capture of this place, he deserves promotion, which I hereby recommend.

== Post-Civil War ==
After the war, Smith was chief of the Bureau of Equipment and Recruiting in the Department of the Navy from September 17, 1866, to July 17, 1870. He then headed of the New York Naval Shipyard at Brooklyn, New York, until his retirement on May 24, 1871.

Smith died in Green Bay, Wisconsin. He is buried in Woodlawn Cemetery in Green Bay.

== Appointments and ranks ==
- Midshipman – March 1, 1826
- Passed midshipman – April 28, 1832
- Lieutenant – March 8, 1837
- Commander – September 14, 1855
- Captain – July 16, 1862
- Commodore – July 25, 1866
- Rear admiral – July 1, 1870
- Added to retired list – May 24, 1871
