= Gilbert Elliott =

American shipbuilder (1843–1895)

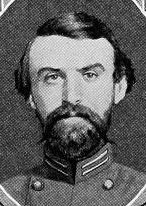
Gilbert Elliot in uniform

Gilbert Elliott (December 10, 1843 – May 9, 1895) was an American Confederate Army officer and shipbuilder, known for the construction of CSS Albemarle, an ironclad ram.

== Family ==
Elliott's parents were Gilbert Elliott (May 20, 1813 – May 20, 1851) and Sarah Ann Grice (June 1, 1819 – April 22, 1891), granddaughter of shipbuilder Charles Grice and Mary Grandy. He was born at the Milford estate in Camden County, North Carolina.

After his mother became a widow she moved to Oxford, North Carolina, and became the author of a cookbook, "Mrs. Elliott's Housewife", published in New York in 1870.

== Education ==
Elliott was educated in the local schools of Elizabeth City, North Carolina. He was a law clerk by 1860.

== Military career ==
He probably enlisted in the Confederate Army on May 16, 1862 at Camp Mangum in North Carolina. The following day he was appointed First Lieutenant and given duty of regimental adjutant. While serving as first lieutenant and adjutant of the Seventh Volunteer Regiment, he participated in and was captured by federal troops in the Battle of Hatteras Inlet Batteries. The whole unit was later released in a prisoner exchange and reorganized as the Seventeenth Regiment, North Carolina Troops at Camp Mangum with Elliot reinstated as adjutant. He was later removed from the unit and assigned to building the Confederate ironclad CSS Albemarle.

Construction of the Confederate ironclad CSS Albemarle began in 1862 in a former cornfield in Halifax County, North Carolina.

== Works cited ==
- Clark, Walter, ed. (1901). Histories of the Several Regiments and Battalions from North Carolina, in the Great War 1861-'65. Vol. II. Goldsboro. LCCN 02026034.
