= United States v. Steever =

- Supreme Court of the United States

Submitted January 9, 1885 Decided March 16, 1885
- Full case name: Hardin v. Boyd
- Citations: 113 U.S. 747 (more) 5 S. Ct. 765; 28 L. Ed. 1133

Case history
- Prior: Swan v. United States, 19 Ct. Cl. 51 (1884)

Court membership
- Chief Justice Morrison Waite Associate Justices Samuel F. Miller · Stephen J. Field; Joseph P. Bradley · John M. Harlan; William B. Woods · Stanley Matthews; Horace Gray · Samuel Blatchford

Case opinion
- Majority: Gray, joined by unanimous

United States v. Steever, 113 U.S. 747 (1885), was an appeal from the court of claims to recover the amount necessary to make up his lawful share of the prize money awarded for the capture of the Confederate naval ram Albemarle.

The rebel iron-clad ram CSS Albemarle was captured and sunk at Plymouth, in the Roanoke River, in the State of North Carolina, on the night of October 27, 1864, by the United States Picket Launch No. 1, an armed torpedo launch propelled by steam, attached to a division of the North Atlantic blockading squadron, and commanded by Lieut. William B. Cushing, of the United States navy, and having on board six inferior officers (of whom the petitioner, a third assistant engineer, was one) and eight men. Lieut. Cushing had been, by order of the Secretary of the Navy, detached from the command of the United States ship Monticello and directed to report for duty to Rear Admiral Porter, commanding that squadron, and had been assigned by the admiral to the command of this launch. It does not appear that the launch had any books. The Albemarle was afterwards raised by the United States forces, and appropriated to the use of the United States, and was twice appraised by duly appointed boards of naval officers, the first time, before she was so appropriated at the sum of, 944, which was forthwith deposited by the Secretary of the Navy with the assistant Treasurer of the United States at Washington, and the second time, under the Act of April 1, 1872, c. 76, 17 Stat. 649, at the sum of 2,856.90, which, less the sum already deposited, was likewise so deposited, pursuant to the Act of January 8, 1873, c. 18, 17 Stat. 405.

A torpedo steam launch, attached to a division of a naval squadron, though not proved to have had any books, is a ship, within the meaning of the prize Act of June 30, 1864, ch. 174, § 10, Rules 4 and 5, and her commander is entitled to one-tenth of prize money awarded to her, and cannot elect to take instead a share proportioned to his rate of pay; but her other officers and men are entitled to share in proportion to their rates of pay.

The distribution of prize money among the subordinate officers and crew of a ship "in proportion to their respective rates of pay in the service" under the Prize Act of June 30, 1864, ch. 174, § 10, Rule 5, is to be made according to their pay at the time of the capture, and not according to the pay of grades to which they have since been promoted as of that time.

Under the Act of August 8, 1882, c. 480, referring the claims of the captors of the ram Albemarle to the Court of Claims, each captor is entitled to recover such a sum as, together with the sum formerly paid him by the Secretary of the Navy under the prize decrees in the case of the Albemarle, will equal his lawful share of the prize money in that case.

The judgment was affirmed.

== Later developments ==
Following other protracted disputes related to the Spanish–American War, the United States Congress cancelled all outstanding prize money for naval personnel in 1899 and repealed most of the authorizing statutes. Since then, there have been very few cases about this topic, although prize was historically influential for many kinds of international law. United States naval personnel stopped being instructed about prize after World War II.
