= USS Isaac N. Seymour =

Union navy gunboat steamer in the American Civil War

History

United States
- Name: USS Isaac N. Seymour
- Builder: Benjamin C. Terry (Keyport, NJ)
- Launched: 1860
- Christened: I. N. Seymour
- Acquired: 26 October 1861
- Commissioned: (USN): Nov 1861—16 May 1865
- In service: 1861—on or after 1888
- Renamed: USS Isaac N. Seymour (1861); USLHT Tulip (1865); Magnolia (1882)
- Stricken: 1882 (est.)
- Fate: Sold foreign, 1888

General characteristics
- Type: Gunboat
- Displacement: 133 long tons
- Length: 100 ft (30 m)
- Beam: 19 ft 8 in (5.99 m)
- Draught: 6 ft 0 in (1.83 m)
- Installed power: 1 × 30-in bore, 6-ft stroke vertical beam steam engine
- Propulsion: Sidewheels
- Speed: Average 5 knots; maximum 11 knots
- Armament: 1 × 30-pounder parrott rifle; 1 × 20-pounder parrott rifle

USS Isaac N. Seymour, also referred to variously as Seymour, I. N. Seymour and J. N. Seymour, was a steamer acquired by the Union Navy for use as a gunboat during the American Civil War. She was used by the Navy as a littoral ship in fire support, supply and blockading roles.

== Construction and design ==
Isaac N. Seymour was a wooden-hulled sidewheel steamer built by Benjamin C. Terry at Keyport, New Jersey, in 1860 as the tugboat I. N. Seymour. The ship had a displacement of 133 long tons, a length of 100 feet, beam of 19 feet 8 inches and hold depth of 7 feet 6 inches; her draft fully loaded was 6 feet 6 inches, with a light draft of 5 feet 6 inches. I. N. Seymour was powered by a vertical beam steam engine with a 30-inch bore and 6-foot stroke, built by Fletcher, Harrison & Co. of New York. The vessel had an average speed of 5 knots and a maximum speed of 11 knots.

On 26 October 1861, I. N. Seymour was purchased from Mr. Schultz by George D. Morgan on behalf of the United States Navy for the sum of $18,000. Renamed USS Isaac N. Seymour, the ship was fitted out with one 30- and one 20-pdr Parrott rifle for use as a gunboat.

== Service history ==
Isaac N. Seymour was assigned to the North Atlantic Blockading Squadron 20 November and 3 days later was stationed in Hampton Roads, Virginia. While there she joined three other ships in engaging Confederate steamer CSS Patrick Henry and drove her back up stream.

A month later Flag Officer Louis M. Goldsborough ordered Isaac N. Seymour to Hatteras Inlet for impending operations in the sounds of North Carolina. She participated in the combined operations which took Roanoke Island 8 February, and at the end of the action she was commended for being "conspicuously in the foreground throughout the bombardment." One of her powdermen was killed and her chief engineer was seriously wounded in the fight.

The next day Isaac N. Seymour steamed up Pasquotank River to Elizabeth City, North Carolina, with Comdr. Rowan's expedition to destroy enemy gunboats and to break up communications between Albemarle Sound and Norfolk, Virginia. She continued mop-up operations in the sounds until she struck an abandoned anchor in Hatteras Inlet 20 February and sank before she could be run aground.

She was raised, repaired, and returned to service in May. She resumed her former duty and continued to give a good account of herself in the sounds until 24 August when she struck a bank and sank in the Neuse River some 3 miles above New Bern, North Carolina, while steaming upstream to cover a landing of troops. A month later she was reported raised and on the ways being readied for service.

Back in fighting trim 23 October, she was ordered to tow schooner Minnehaha to Plymouth, North Carolina, to deliver provisions. Five days later she made the return passage towing damaged steamer USS Whitehead to New Bern, North Carolina, for repairs. Similar duty maintaining communications and lines of supply between Navy units in the sounds continued until 12 December when Isaac N. Seymour ascended the Neuse River with four other ships to support an Army expedition to destroy railroad bridges and track near Goldsboro, North Carolina, but the mission was aborted by low water which prevented their advancing more than 15 miles beyond New Bern.

Confederate troops attacked the Union garrison at Washington, North Carolina, 31 March 1863 establishing a siege which threatened to starve the Northern troops into surrender. Isaac N. Seymour departed Plymouth, North Carolina, 2 April to play an active role in the naval operations which, despite well-served batteries ashore, brought the beleaguered soldiers food and ammunition. The Southern troops were finally forced to lift the blockade 16 April. Once again the daring and versatility of the Navy had been decisive in holding a hard-pressed position for the North.

Isaac N. Seymour was a part of the task force which started up the James River 11 July to demonstrate against Richmond, Virginia. The high point of the expedition came 14 July when Rear Admiral Samuel Phillips Lee, flying his flag in Isaac N. Seymour, occupied Fort Powhatan, the last Confederate defense on the river below Chaffin's and Drewry's Bluff.

Isaac N. Seymour continued to serve in the North Atlantic Blockading Squadron—maintaining Union control of North Carolina's inland waters and supporting Army operations from the James and York Rivers as General U.S. Grant supplied and supported by water, relentlessly pressed toward Richmond and victory.

Isaac N. Seymour was detached in March 1865 and decommissioned at Washington, D.C. 16 May. She was transferred to the Lighthouse Board 20 June which she served as Tulip until sold and redocumented Magnolia 7 June 1882. Magnolia was sold to a foreign owner in 1888.
