= USS Hull =

Four ships of the United States Navy have borne the name USS Hull, in honor of Commodore Isaac Hull.

- USS Hull (DD-7), was a Bainbridge-class destroyer, launched in 1902 and sold in 1921
- USS Hull (DD-330), was a Clemson-class destroyer, launched in 1921 and sold in 1931
- USS Hull (DD-350), was a Farragut-class destroyer launched in 1934 and lost in a typhoon in 1944
- USS Hull (DD-945), was a Forrest Sherman-class destroyer, launched in 1957 and struck in 1983

== See also ==
- USS Commodore Hull (1862)
