= USS Commodore Hull =

Gunboat of the United States Navy

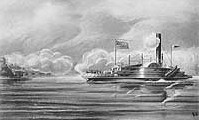
- USS Commodore Hull

History

United States
- Name: USS Commodore Hull
- Namesake: Commodore Isaac Hull
- Ordered: as Nuestra Senora de Regla
- Launched: 1860
- Acquired: 1 September 1862
- Commissioned: 27 November 1862
- Decommissioned: 8 June 1865
- Fate: Sold, 27 September 1865

General characteristics
- Type: Gunboat
- Displacement: 376 long tons (382 t)
- Length: 141 ft (43 m)
- Beam: 28 ft 4 in (8.64 m)
- Draft: 9 ft (2.7 m)
- Propulsion: Steam engine; side-wheel propelled
- Speed: 10 kn (12 mph; 19 km/h)
- Armament: 2 × 30-pounder rifles; 4 × 24-pounder smoothbore guns

USS Commodore Hull was a ferryboat acquired by the Union Navy during the American Civil War. She was outfitted as a gunboat and assigned to the Union blockade of the Confederate States of America.

== Service history ==
Commodore Hull – a side-wheel ferryboat – was built at New York City in 1860 (or 1861) as the civilian ferryboat Nuestra Señora del Regla, intended for use at Havana, Cuba. Purchased by the Union Navy on 1 September 1862, she was converted to a gunboat and commissioned on 27 November 1862, Acting Master W. G. Saltonstall in command. Commodore Hull was named in honor of Commodore Isaac Hull (1773–1843), a significant U.S. Naval commander during and after the War of 1812. There were four subsequent USS Hulls, all destroyers. Commodore Hull's ferryboat design made her especially useful for operations in sheltered waters, so she was assigned to the North Atlantic Blockading Squadron and operated along the coasts and rivers of Virginia and North Carolina. She took part in the siege of Washington, N.C. from 30 March – 16 April 1863. In Albemarle Sound, she took part in the 5 May 1864 Battle of Albemarle Sound with the Confederate ironclad CSS Albemarle. As a picket, Commodore Hull was the first to sight the formidable ram approaching and fired at her from close quarters in the three-hour engagement.

Commodore Hull joined in the attacks on and the capture of Plymouth, N.C. on 29 October. On 31 October, she was heavily damaged by Confederate batteries, losing four killed and three wounded. Coxswain Patrick Colbert was awarded the Medal of Honor for action on that date. Commodore Hull was repaired and remained active until the end of the Civil War. She was decommissioned on 8 June 1865 at the New York Navy Yard. Commodore Hull was sold at the Yard on 27 September. She was subsequently renamed to Waccamaw in civilian employment, which lasted until sometime prior to 1885. Abandoned on the Cape Fear River across from downtown Wilmington, North Carolina, the steamboat was burned to the waterline in 1886. Some of her remains (consisting of the engine bed, boiler foundation, portions of the lower hull and paddle wheel spokes) are still visible at low tide.
