= USS Whitehead =

Gunboat of the United States Navy

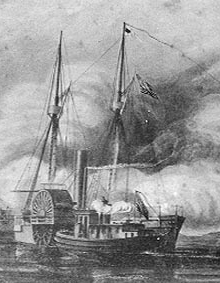
- USS Whitehead

History

United States
- Name: USS Whitehead
- Launched: 1861
- Commissioned: 19 November 1861
- Decommissioned: 29 June 1865
- Fate: Sold at public auction, 10 August 1865; Destroyed by fire, 1 September 1872

General characteristics
- Type: Steam gunboat
- Displacement: 136 long tons (138 t)
- Length: 93 ft 2 in (28.40 m)
- Beam: 19 ft 9 in (6.02 m)
- Draft: 8 ft (2.4 m)
- Propulsion: Steam engine
- Speed: 8 knots (15 km/h; 9.2 mph)
- Armament: 1 × 30-pounder Parrott rifle

USS Whitehead, a screw steamer built in 1861 at New Brunswick, New Jersey, served as a gunboat in the United States Navy during the American Civil War.

Whitehead was purchased by the Navy on 17 October 1861 at New York City from D. B. Martin, and commissioned on 19 November 1861, Acting Master Charles A. French in command.

== Service history ==
=== North Carolina blockade, 1862 ===
The following day, Whitehead reached Hampton Roads and joined the North Atlantic Blockading Squadron. She sailed for the North Carolina coast on 28 December 1861 and arrived at Hatteras Inlet on 4 January 1862.

During the next few months, the steamer Whitehead carried out extensive operations against Confederate vessels and shore installations in the sounds and rivers of North Carolina. On 7–8 February, she helped to capture Roanoke Island. On 10 February, Whitehead took schooner M. C. Etheridge on the Pasquotank River. On 10 April, she made prizes of schooners Comet and J. J. Crittendon and of sloop America in Newbegun Creek. Together with the John L. Lockwood, General Putnam, and Shawsheen, Whitehead blocked the mouth of the Albemarle and Chesapeake Canal with fill on 23–24 April. She captured schooner Eugenia in Bennett's Creek on 20 May and took Ella D off Keel's Creek two days later.

Late in September, Whitehead briefly left North Carolina waters to participate in a Federal assault upon Confederate forces gathered at Franklin, Virginia. On 3 October, Commodore Perry, Hunchback and Whitehead entered the Blackwater River and fired on Rebel troops for over six hours before a barricade placed across the channel necessitated retreat. One of Whitehead's sailors, Ordinary Seaman Edwin Smith, was awarded the Medal of Honor for his actions during this engagement.

Whitehead soon returned to Pamlico Sound but was ordered north on 16 November 1862 for repairs at the Washington Navy Yard. At this time, 3-inch iron plate was placed over her guns and around her pilot house. Back in fighting trim, Whitehead returned to North Carolina late in December 1862.

=== River campaign, 1863 ===
Her first noteworthy action came early in the spring of 1863 when she helped to lift the Confederate siege of Washington, North Carolina, which lasted from 31 March to 16 April. On 6–7 July, Whitehead, Commodore Perry, Southfield and Valley City bombarded and occupied Williamston, North Carolina. Whitehead captured several prisoners during an expedition up the Pasquotank River on 14 August 1863 and destroyed a Confederate corn mill on the Roanoke River on 22 February 1864. On 1–2 March 1864, Whitehead and Southfield sailed up the Chowan River and freed USS Bombshell from her encirclement by Confederate shore batteries.

=== CSS Albemarle, 1864 ===
Whitehead encountered the formidable Confederate ram CSS Albemarle on three occasions. In the early morning hours of 19 April 1864, Ceres, Miami, Southfield and Whitehead engaged the ram in the Roanoke River. All received damage, and Southfield was sunk. Darkness prevented Whitehead from returning Albemarle's fire. As a result of this costly Union naval defeat, Plymouth, North Carolina fell to Confederate troops the next day.

Union vessels, including Whitehead, again fought Albemarle on 5 May 1864. This three-hour Battle of Albemarle Sound was inconclusive, and the ram withdrew up the Roanoke. Whitehead battled Albemarle a third time on 24 May 1864. A shell from Whitehead exploded near the ram's stern and caused the dreaded Confederate warship to withdraw.

=== Continuing the blockade, 1864–1865 ===
Whitehead resumed routine patrol and reconnaissance duty soon after this. On 12 July 1864, she ascended the Scuppernong River to Columbia, North Carolina, and burned a bridge used to transport supplies to Southern troops at Plymouth. Whitehead and steamers Thomas Colyer and Massasoit joined in an expedition up the Chowan River on 28 July 1864, capturing steamer Arrow and a large quantity of cotton and tobacco on 29 July at Gatesville, North Carolina. Whitehead proceeded to the Norfolk Navy Yard for repairs on 20 August 1864. She completed these in time for her to participate in the recapture of Plymouth on 31 October 1864.

For the closing months of the Civil War, Whitehead, but for occasional runs to Norfolk, Virginia for supplies, patrolled the inland waters of North Carolina. She was decommissioned at the Philadelphia Navy Yard on 29 June 1865 and was sold at public auction there on 10 August 1865. Re-documented as Nevada on 7 October 1865, the steamer remained in mercantile service until she was destroyed by fire on 1 September 1872 at New London, Connecticut.

== See also ==
- Union Navy
