= Joseph Carson (pharmacist) =

American physician

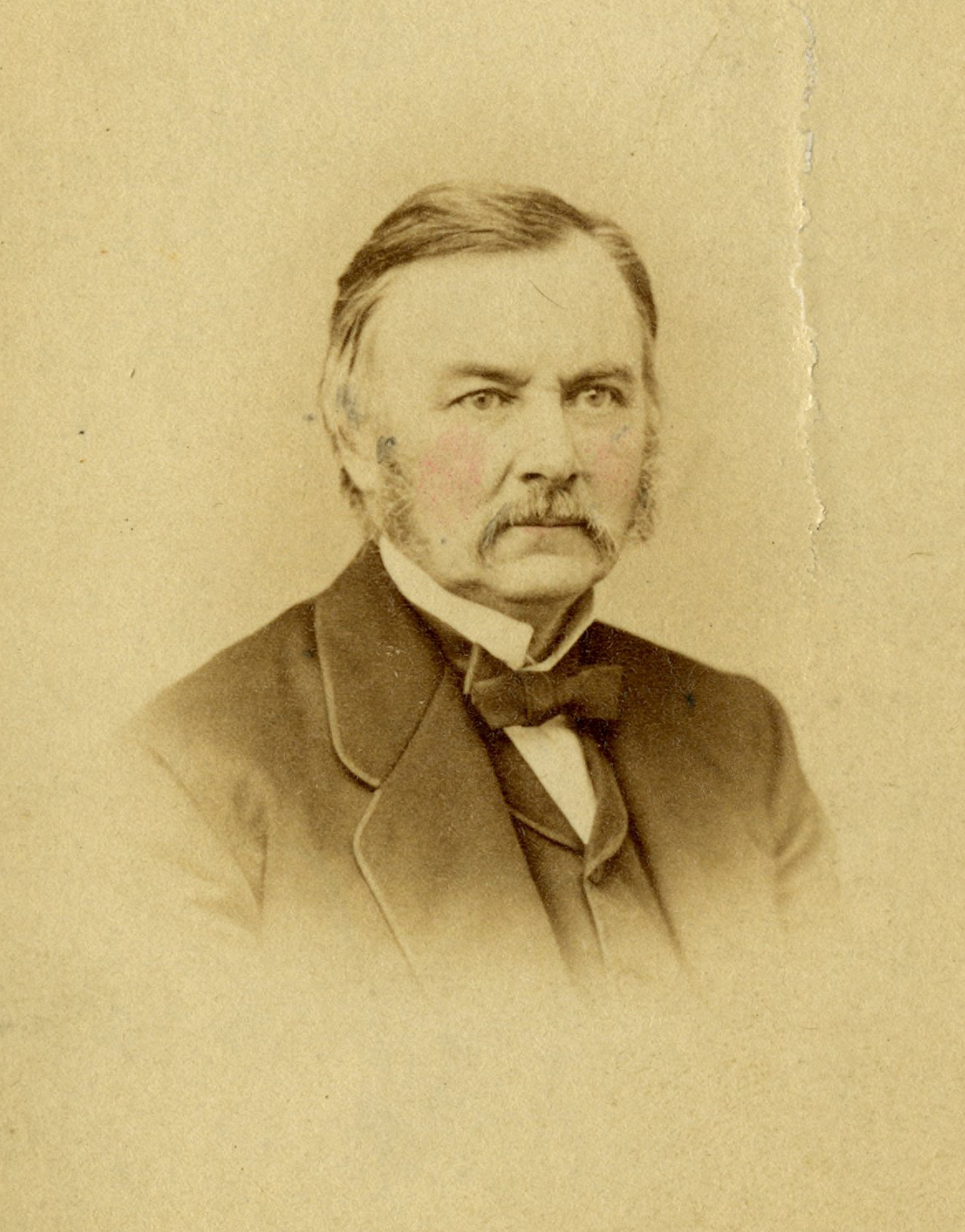
Photograph of Joseph Carson (circa 1860)

Joseph Carson (born April 19, 1808, Philadelphia; died December 30, 1876) was an American medical doctor and medical botanist.

== Biography ==
He was privately schooled in Philadelphia. He graduated from the University of Pennsylvania in 1826, and from the Medical School of the University in 1830. He began a practice in 1832, which emphasized obstetrics. He studied botany throughout his life. From 1836 to 1850, he was professor of materia medica in the Philadelphia College of Pharmacy. He held a similar chair in the University of Pennsylvania from 1850 to 1876. In 1870 he was president of the national convention for the revision of the United States Pharmacopeia. He was elected as a member to the American Philosophical Society in 1844.

== Works ==
For a number of years he was an associate editor of the American Journal of Pharmacy. He edited Jonathan Pereira's Elements of Materia Medica (1843; 2d ed., 2 vols., 1845) and J. Forbes Royle's Materia Medica and Therapeutics (1847); he published Illustrations of Medical Botany (1847) to which he contributed many drawings. The standard author abbreviation Carson is used to indicate this person as the author when citing a botanical name.

== Family ==
He married Mary Goddard in 1841 and Mary Hollingsworth in 1848. With the latter he had four children.
