= James W. Cooke =

James Wallace Cooke
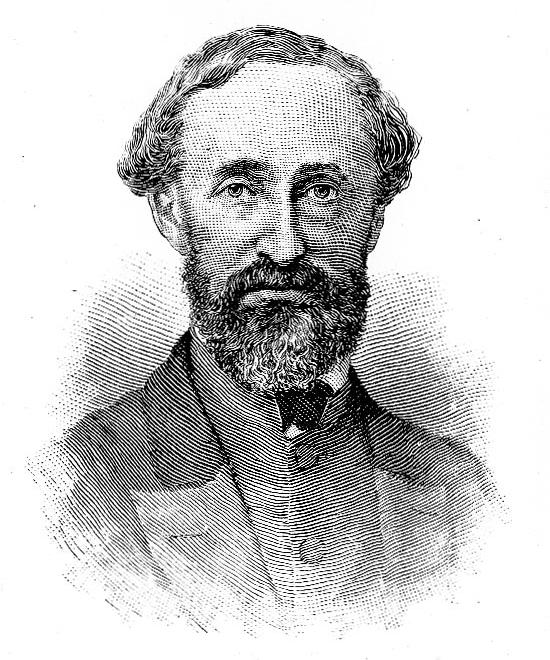
- James Wallace Cooke
- Born: August 23, 1812; Beaufort, North Carolina, US
- Died: June 21, 1869 (aged 56); Portsmouth, Virginia, US
- Military career
- Allegiance: United States of America; Virginia; Confederate States of America
- Branch: United States Navy; Virginia State Navy; Confederate States Navy
- Service years: 1828–1861 (USN); 1861–1865 (CSN)
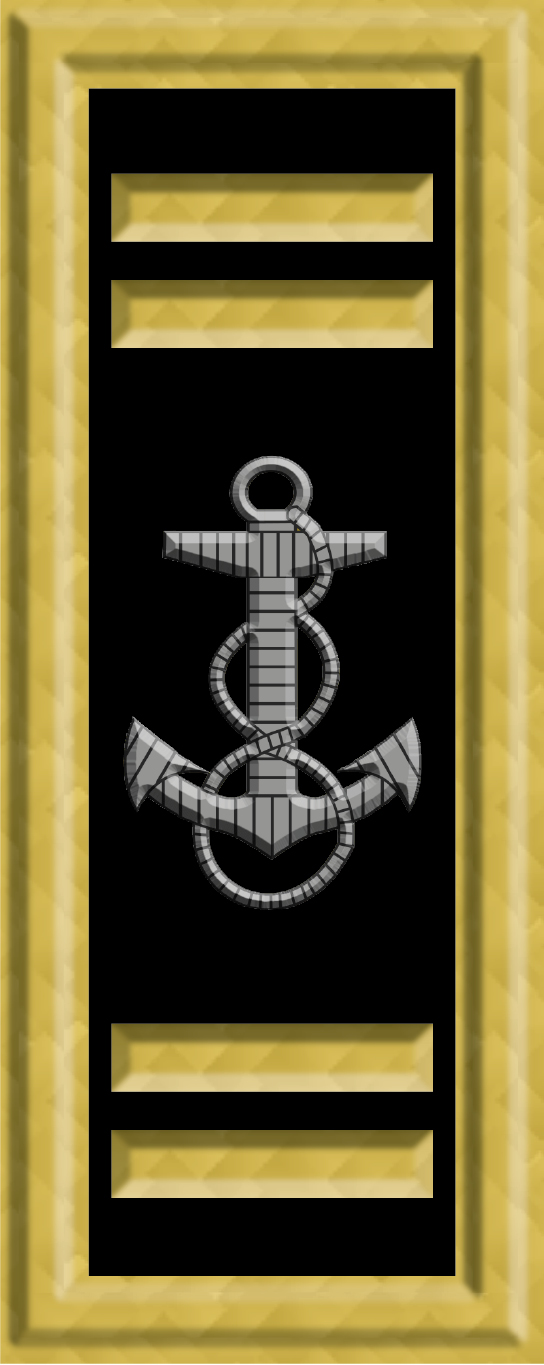
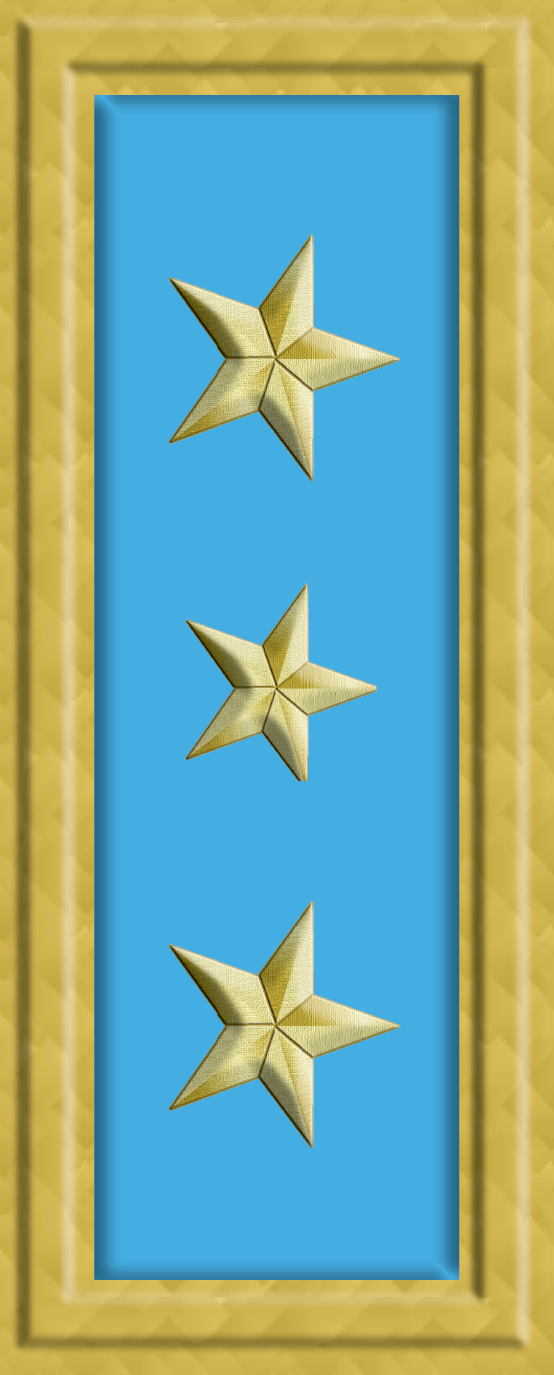
- Rank: Lieutenant (USN) Captain (CSN)
- Commands: CSS Ellis; CSS Albemarle
- Conflicts: American Civil War

James Wallace Cooke (August 23, 1812 – June 21, 1869) was an American naval officer, serving in the United States Navy and during the American Civil War serving in the Confederate Navy.

== Pre-war life ==
James Wallace Cooke was born in Beaufort, North Carolina, and was orphaned at the age of 4. In 1828, with the help of his uncle, he was appointed to the United States Navy as a Midshipman. In May 1861, while holding the rank of Lieutenant, he resigned his U.S. commission.

== Civil War service ==
At the start of the Civil War in 1861 Cooke joined the Virginia State Navy, and entered the service of the Confederacy in the following June. Later that year he was placed in command of the small gunboat CSS Ellis, and was captured with her after a hard fight near Roanoke Island, North Carolina on February 10, 1862. Wounded in that action and soon paroled, he was promoted to commander in June 1862.

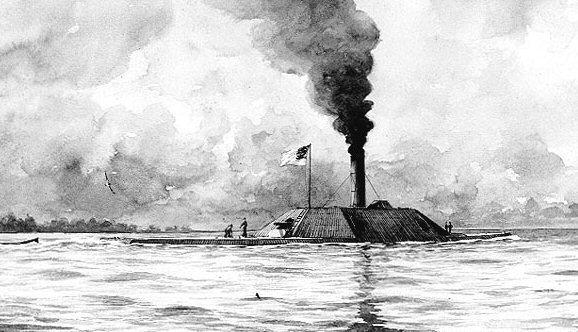
CSS Albemarle

Commander Cooke's next assignment was to oversee the construction of the ironclad ram CSS Albemarle, under construction at "Edward's Ferry" near modern-day Scotland Neck, North Carolina, from January 1863. After many difficulties, Albemarle was successfully completed in April 1864, and Cooke became her commanding officer. On April 19 and May 5, he took her into action against Federal forces, sinking one gunboat and disabling or driving off others. That June he was promoted to the rank of captain and was later placed in charge of Confederate naval forces on North Carolina's internal waters, holding that position until the end of the Civil War in 1865.

== Late life and death ==
James W. Cooke died at Portsmouth, Virginia in 1869, and is buried at Cedar Grove Cemetery.
