= CSS Albemarle =

Confederate States Navy ironclad

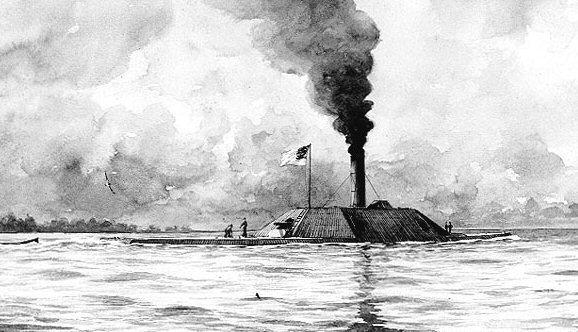
- A drawing of Albemarle

History

Confederate States
- Name: Albemarle
- Namesake: Albemarle Sound
- Ordered: 16 April 1862
- Laid down: January 1863
- Commissioned: 17 April 1864
- Fate: 27 October 1864 sunk by spar torpedo, captured, raised, and sold

General characteristics
- Displacement: 376 tons
- Length: 158 ft (48 m)
- Beam: 35.4 ft (10.8 m)
- Draught: 9 ft (2.7 m)
- Propulsion: Steam
- Speed: 4 knots (7.4 km/h; 4.6 mph)
- Range: 120 miles, 193 km
- Complement: 150 officers and men
- Armament: two 6.4 Brooke double-banded rifles

CSS Albemarle was a steam-powered casemate ironclad ram of the Confederate Navy (and later the second Albemarle of the United States Navy), named for an estuary in North Carolina which was named for General George Monck, the first Duke of Albemarle and one of the original Carolina Lords Proprietor.

== Construction ==
On 16 April 1862, the Confederate Navy Department, enthusiastic about the offensive potential of armored rams following the victory of their first ironclad ram CSS Virginia (the rebuilt USS Merrimack) over the wooden-hulled Union blockaders in Hampton Roads, Virginia, signed a contract with nineteen-year-old detached Confederate Lieutenant Gilbert Elliott of Elizabeth City, North Carolina; he was to oversee the construction of a smaller but still powerful gunboat to destroy the Union warships in the North Carolina sounds. These men-of-war had enabled Union troops to hold strategic positions that controlled eastern North Carolina.

Since the terms of the agreement gave Elliott freedom to select an appropriate place to build the ram, he established a primitive shipyard, with the assistance of plantation owner Peter Smith, in a cornfield up the Roanoke River at a place called Edward's Ferry, near modern Scotland Neck, North Carolina; Smith was appointed the superintendent of construction. There, the water was too shallow to permit the approach of Union gunboats that otherwise would have destroyed the ironclad while still on its ways. Using detailed sketches provided by Elliott, the Confederate Navy's Chief Constructor John L. Porter finalized the gunboat's design, giving the ram an armored casemate with eight sloping, 30-degree angle sides. Within this thick-walled bunker were two 6.4-inch (160 mm) Brooke pivot rifles, one forward, the other aft, each capable of firing from three different fixed positions. Both cannons were protected on all sides behind six exterior-mounted, heavy iron shutters. The ram was propelled by twin 3-bladed screw propellers powered by two steam engines, each of 200 hp (150 kW), and built by Elliott.

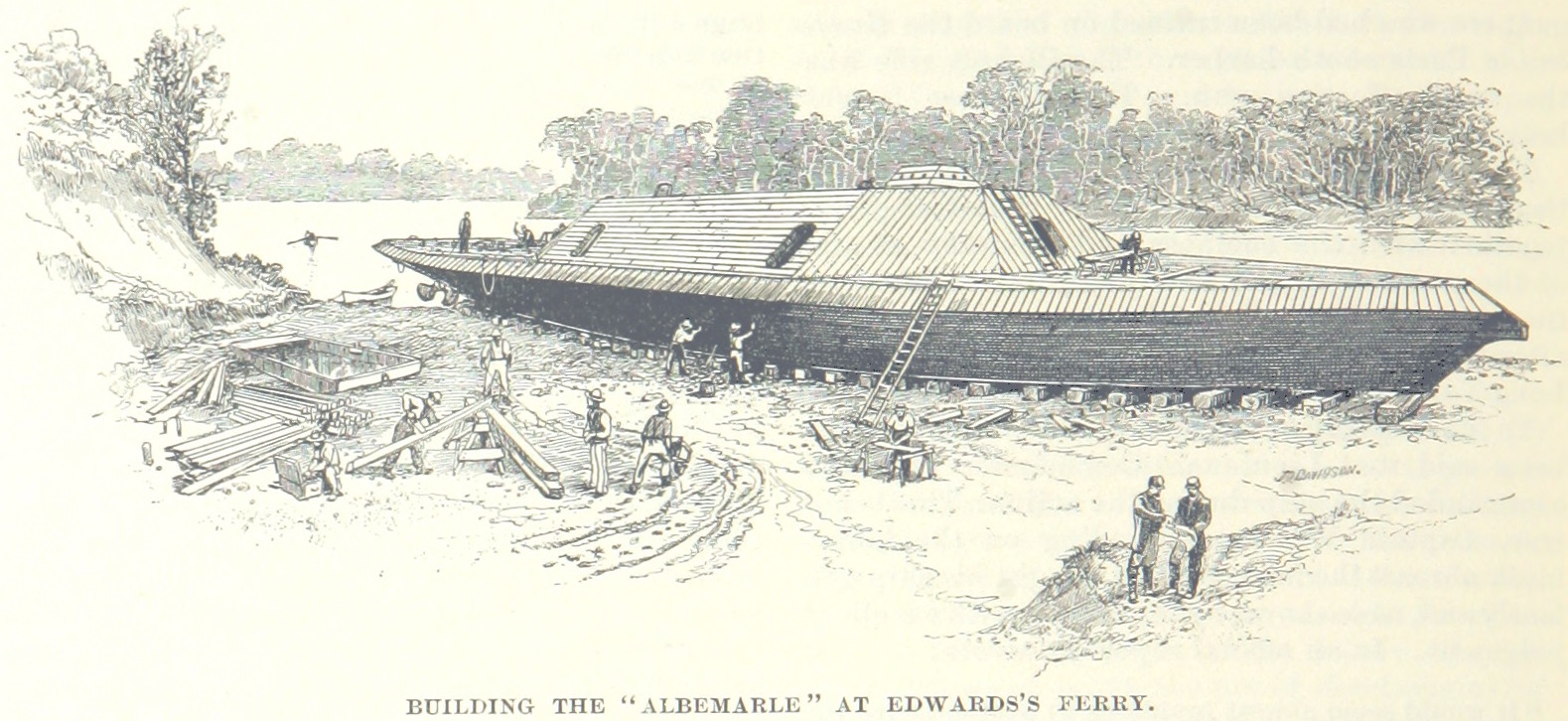
Building the Albemarle

Construction of the ironclad began in January 1863 and continued on during the next year. Word of the gunboat reached the Union naval officers stationed in the region, raising an alarm. They appealed to the War Department for an overland expedition to destroy the ship, to be christened Albemarle after the body of water into which the Roanoke emptied, but the Union Army never felt it could spare the troops needed to carry out such a mission; it was a decision that would prove to be very short-sighted.

== Ordnance and projectiles ==
Albemarle was equipped with two 6.4-inch (160 mm) Brooke rifled cannon (similar to a Parrott rifle); each double-banded cannon weighed more than 12,000 pounds (5,400 kg) with its pivot carriage and other attached hardware. Both cannons were positioned along the ironclad's center-line in the armored casemate, one forward, the other aft. The field of fire for both pivot rifles was 180-degrees, from port to starboard: each cannon could fire from one of three gun ports, allowing Albemarle to deliver a two cannon broadside. Albemarle's projectiles consisted of explosive shells, anti-personnel canister shot, grapeshot, and blunt-nosed, solid wrought iron "bolts" for use against Union armored ships. These were an early attempt at armor-piercing shot; solid iron like a typical solid shot, but elongated rather than spherical, giving far more weight for an equal frontal area than a traditional round ball, and thus greater penetration. Such projectiles could not be effectively fired from a traditional smoothbore naval gun, as the lack of stability would cause the shot to tumble in flight.

== Service on the Roanoke River ==
In April 1864 the newly commissioned Confederate States Steamer Albemarle, under the command of Captain James W. Cooke, got underway down-river toward Plymouth, North Carolina; its mission was to clear the river of all Union vessels so that General Robert Hoke's troops could storm the forts located there. She anchored about three miles (5 km) above the town, and the pilot, John Lock, set off with two seamen in a small boat to take soundings. The river was high, and they discovered there was 10 feet (3.0 m) of water over the obstructions that the Union forces had placed in the Thoroughfare Gap. Captain Cooke immediately ordered steam and, by keeping to the middle of the channel, they passed safely over the obstructions. The ironclad's armor protected them from the Union guns of the forts at Warren's Neck and Boyle's Mill.

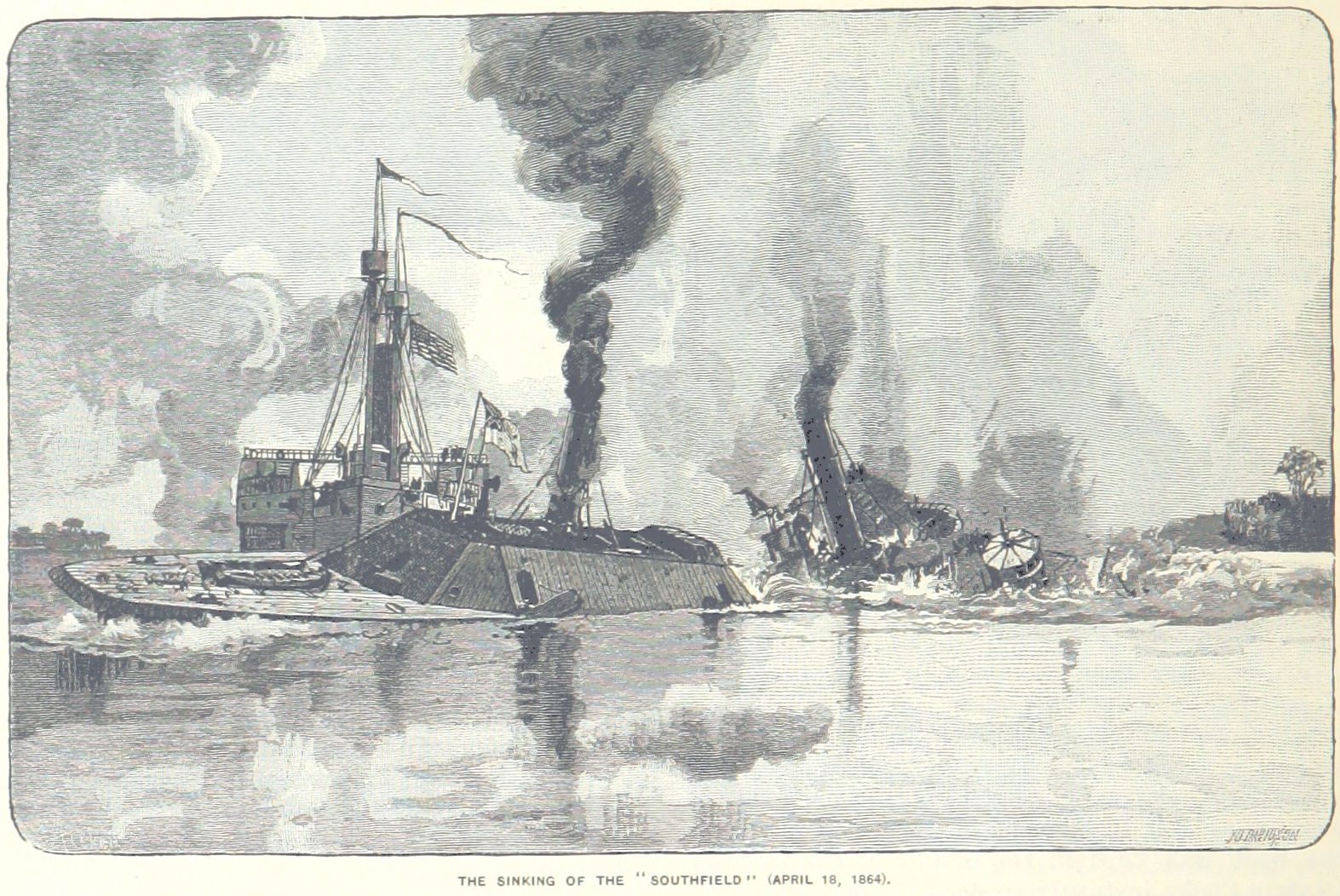
Albemarle's ram sinks Southfield

However, two paddle steamers, USS Miami and USS Southfield, lashed together with spars and chains, approached from up-river, attempting to pass on either side of Albemarle in order to trap her between them. Captain Cooke turned heavily to starboard, getting outboard of Southfield, but running dangerously close to the southern shore. Turning back sharply into the river, he rammed the Union sidewheeler, driving her under; Albemarle's ram became trapped in Southfield's hull from the force of the blow, and her bow was pulled under as well. As Southfield sank, she rolled over before settling on the riverbed; this action released the death grip that held the new Confederate ram.

Miami fired a shell into Albemarle at point-blank range while she was trapped by the wreck of Southfield, but the shell rebounded off Albemarle's sloping iron armor and exploded on Miami, killing her commanding officer, Captain Charles W. Flusser. Miami's crew attempted to board Albemarle to capture her but were soon driven back by heavy musket fire; Miami then steered clear of the ironclad and escaped into Albemarle Sound.

With the river now clear of Union ships, and with the assistance of Albemarle's rifled cannon, General Hoke attacked and took Plymouth and the nearby forts.

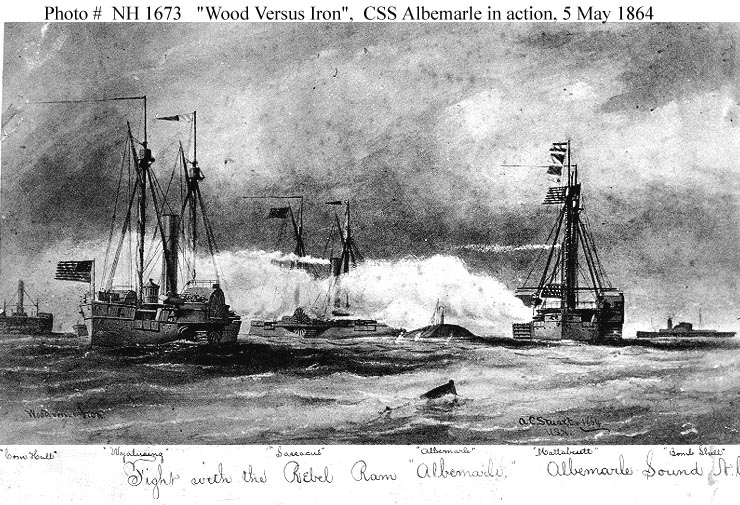
The encounter at Albemarle Sound, May 5, 1864. From left to right are USS Commodore Hull, USS Wyalusing, USS Sassacus, CSS Albemarle, USS Mattabesett and CSS Bombshell

On May 5 Albemarle and CSS Bombshell, a captured steamer, were escorting the troop-laden CSS Cotton Plant down the Roanoke River; they encountered a flotilla of eight Union warships, including USS Miami, USS Mattabesett, USS Sassacus, and USS Wyalusing, in what would become known as the Battle of Albemarle Sound. All four of the listed ships combined mounted more than sixty cannons. Albemarle opened fire first, wounding six men working one of Mattabesett's two 100-pounder Parrott rifles, and then attempted to ram her, but the sidewheeler managed to round the ironclad's armored bow. She was closely followed by Sassacus, which then fired a broadside of solid 9 in (229 mm) and 100-pound shot, all of which bounced off Albemarle's casemate armor. However, Bombshell, being a softer target, was hulled by each heavy shot from Sassucus's broadside and was quickly captured by Union forces, following her surrender.

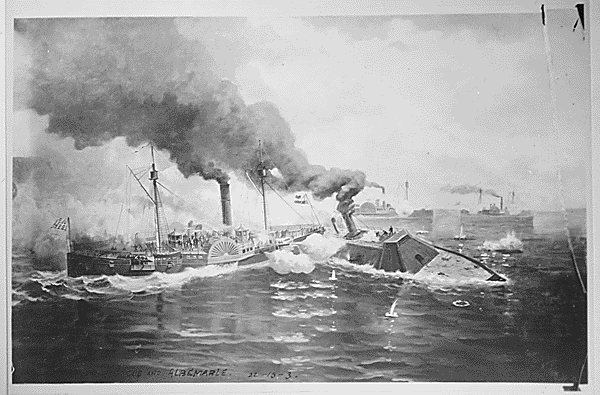
Battle between the Sassacus and the Albemarle, May 1864

Lieutenant Commander Francis Asbury Roe of Sassucus, seeing Albemarle at a range of about 400 yards (370 m), decided to ram. The Union ship struck the Confederate ironclad full and square, broadside-on, shattering the timbers of her own bow, twisting off her own bronze ram in the process, and jamming both ships together. With Sassucus's hull almost touching the end of the ram's Brooke rifle, Albemarle's gun crew quickly fired two point-blank rifled shells, one of them puncturing Sassucus's boilers; though live steam was roaring through the ship, she was able to break away and drift out of range. Miami first tried to use her spar torpedo and then to tangle the Confederate ram's screw propellers and rudder with a seine net, but neither ploy succeeded. More than 500 shells were fired at Albemarle during the battle; with visible battle damage to her smokestack and other areas on the ironclad, she steamed back up the Roanoke, soon mooring at Plymouth.

== Sinking ==
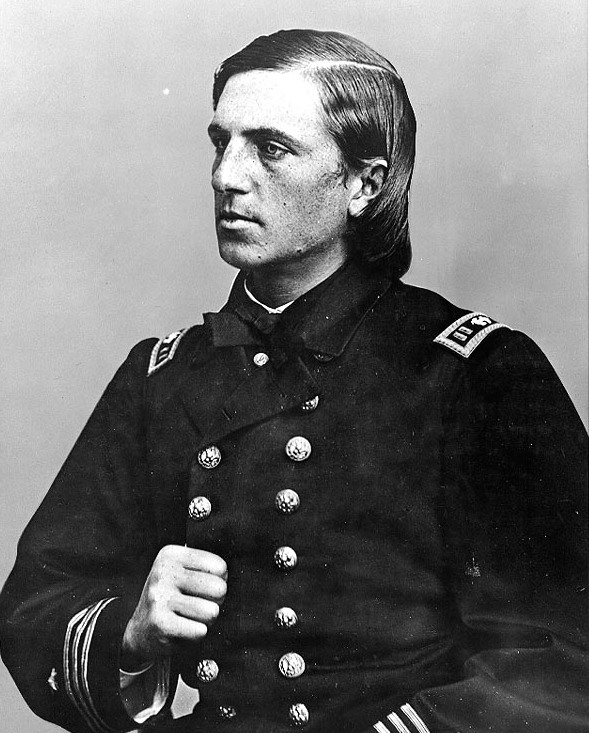
Lt William B Cushing, USN

Albemarle successfully dominated the Roanoke and the approaches to Plymouth through the summer of 1864. By autumn the U. S. government decided that the situation should be studied to determine if something could be done: The U. S. Navy considered various ways to destroy Albemarle, including two plans submitted by Lieutenant William B. Cushing; they finally approved one of his plans, authorizing him to locate two small steam launches that could be fitted with spar torpedoes. Cushing discovered two 30-foot (9.1 m) picket boats under construction in New York and acquired them for his mission (some accounts have them as 45 to 47 feet [14 m]). On each he mounted a Dahlgren 12-pounder howitzer and a 14-foot (4.3 m) spar projecting into the water from its bow. One of the boats was lost at sea during the voyage from New York to Norfolk, Virginia, but the other arrived safely with its crew of seven officers and men at the mouth of the Roanoke. There, the steam launch's spar was fitted with a lanyard-detonated torpedo.

On the night of October 27 and 28, 1864, Cushing and his team began working their way upriver. A small cutter accompanied them, its crew assigned the task of preventing interference by the Confederate sentries stationed on a schooner anchored to the wreck of Southfield; both boats, under the cover of darkness, slipped past the schooner undetected. So Cushing decided to use all twenty-two of his men and the element of surprise to capture Albemarle.

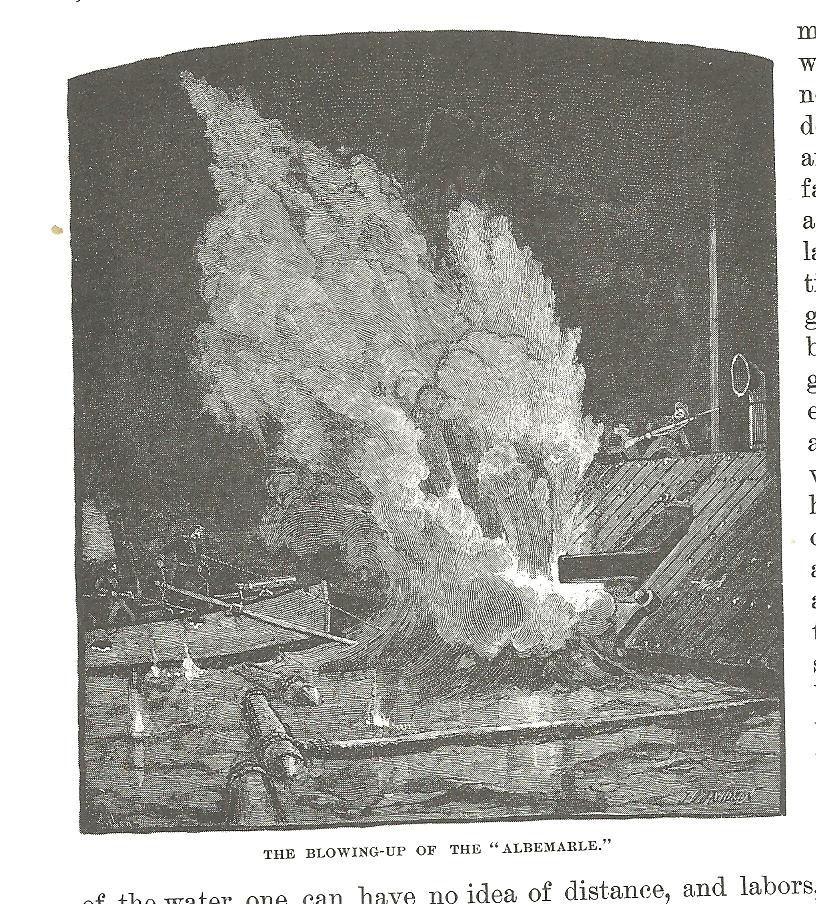
The torpedo explodes against the Albemarle

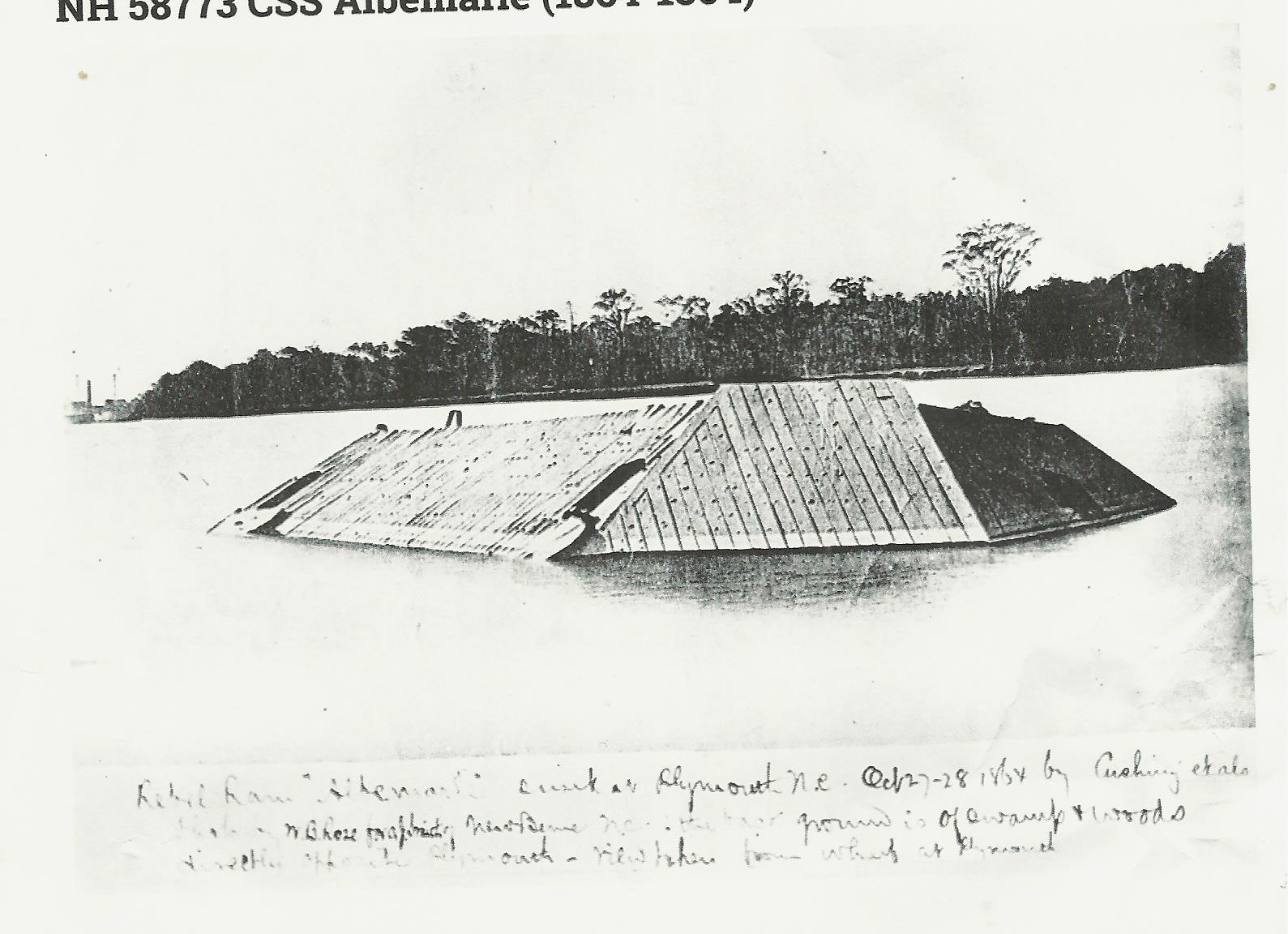
The Sunken Albemarle

As they approached the Confederate docks, their luck turned, and they were spotted in the dark. They came under heavy rifle and pistol fire from both the shore and aboard Albemarle. As they closed with the ironclad, they quickly discovered she was defended against approach by floating log booms. The logs, however, had been in the water for many months and were covered with heavy slime. The steam launch rode up and then over them without difficulty; with her spar fully against the ironclad's hull, Cushing stood up in the bow and pulled the lanyard, detonating the torpedo's explosive charge.

The explosion threw Cushing and his men into the water; Cushing then stripped off most of his uniform and swam to shore, where he hid until daylight, avoiding the hastily organized Confederate search parties. The next afternoon, he stole a small skiff and began slowly paddling, using his hands and arms as oars, down-river to rejoin Union forces at the river's mouth. Cushing's long journey was quite perilous, and he was nearly captured and almost drowned before finally reaching safety, totally exhausted by his ordeal; he was hailed a national hero of the Union cause for his daring exploits. Of the other men in Cushing's launch, Seaman Edward Houghton also escaped, A.M.M. John Woodman and 1/C fireman Samuel Higgins drowned following the explosion, and the remaining eleven were captured.

Cushing's daring commando raid blew a hole in Albemarle's hull at the waterline "big enough to drive a wagon in." She sank immediately in the 6 feet (1.8 m) of water below her keel, settling into the heavy river bottom mud, leaving the upper casemate mostly dry and the ship's large Stainless Banner ensign flying from the flagstaff at the rear of the casemate's upper deck. Lieutenant Cushing's successful disabling of Albemarle is honored by the U.S. Navy with a battle star on the Civil War campaign streamer.

Confederate commander Alexander F. Warley, who had been appointed as her captain about a month earlier, later salvaged both of Albemarle's rifled cannon and shells and used them to defend Plymouth against subsequent Union attack.

Cushing's team recovered Albemarle and received prize money. However, there was a dispute over the allocation of this money. The statute allocated one-tenth of the total prize to the boat's commander. After the rest of the money was distributed among the crew in proportion to their respective wages, the commander's share was actually smaller than three of his subordinates' shares. The dispute lasted 20 years. In 1885, the case reached the United States Supreme Court in United States v. Steever.

== Raising and later service ==
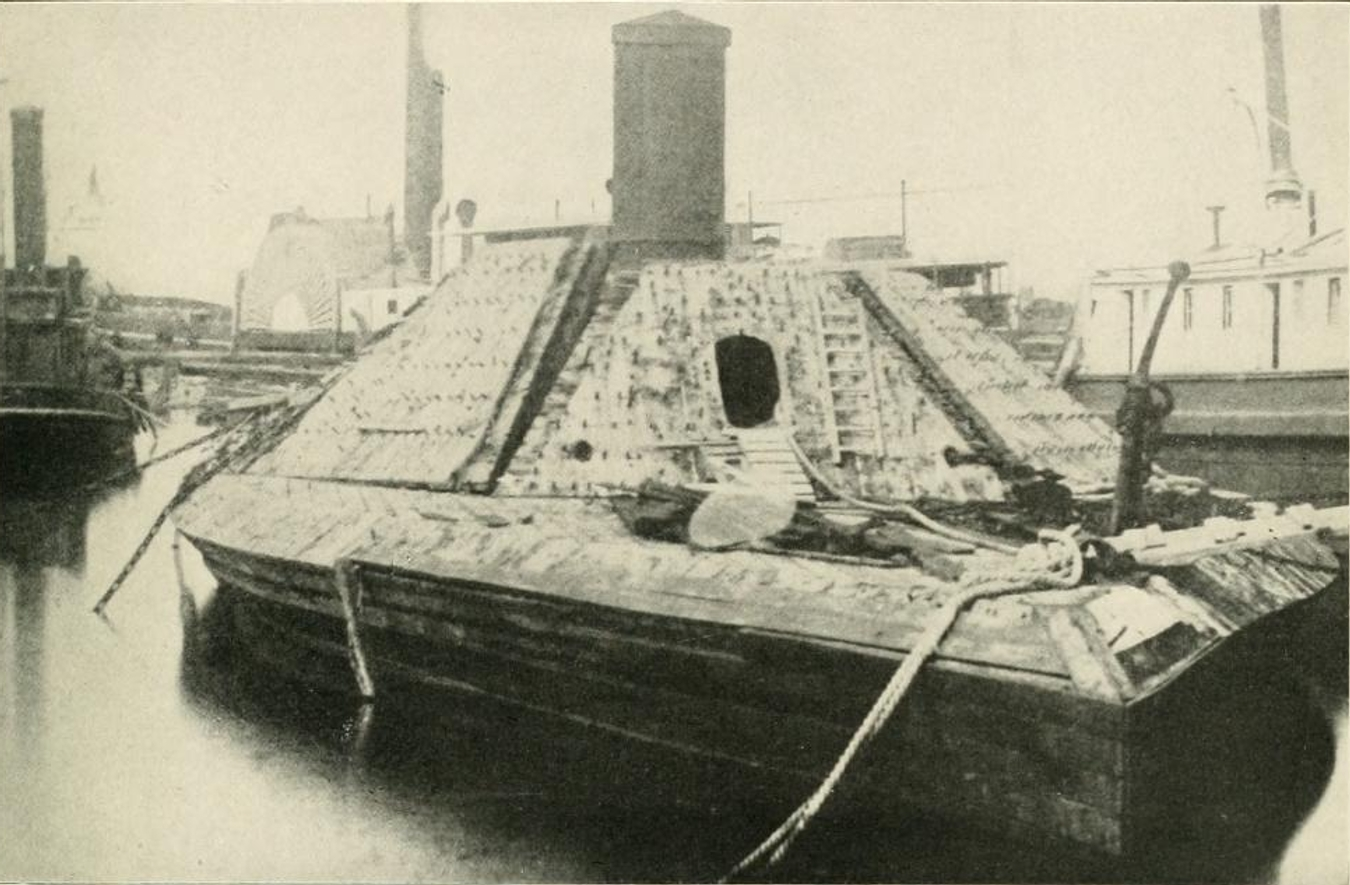
CSS Albemarle. According to Millers Photographic History of the Civil War Vol VI "The Navies" .p.87 this picture was taken after the ram had been raised and salvaged

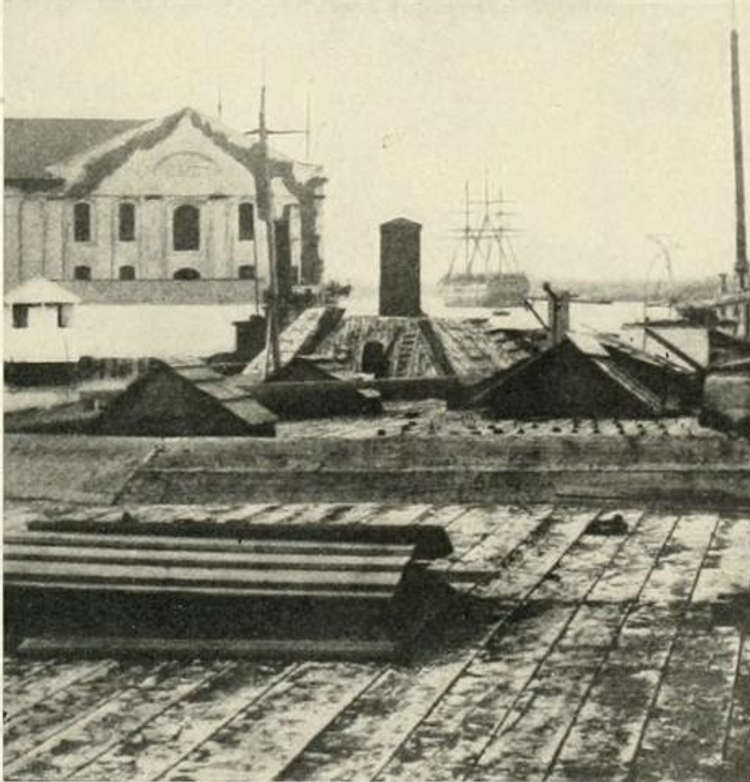
CSS Albemarle. In Millers Photographic History of the Civil War Vol VI "The Navies" .p.87 this picture of the Albemarle is misidentified as the CSS Lady Davis.

After the fall of Plymouth, the U. S. Navy raised and temporarily hull-patched the Confederate ram. Near the end of the war, the Union gunboat USS Ceres towed Albemarle to the Norfolk Navy Yard, where she arrived on 27 April 1865. On 7 June orders were issued to repair her hull, and she entered dry dock soon thereafter. The work was completed on 14 August 1865. Two weeks later, the ironclad was judged condemned by a Washington, D.C. prize court.

She saw no active naval service after being placed in ordinary at Norfolk, where she remained until she was finally sold at public auction on 15 October 1867 to J. N. Leonard and Company. She was probably scrapped for salvage. One of her 6.4-inch (160 mm) double-banded Brooke rifled cannon is on display at the Headquarters of the Commander U. S. Fleet Forces Command at the Norfolk, Virginia, naval base. Her smokestack is on display at the Museum of the Albemarle in Elizabeth City, North Carolina. Her ship's bell is on display at the Port o' Plymouth Museum in Plymouth, North Carolina.

Prize Court Adjudication

Date	Ship Type	Prize Name	Gross Proceeds	Costs and Expenses	Amount for Distribution	Where Adjudicated	Sent to 4th Auditor for Distribution	Vessels Entitled to Share
	Ram	Albemarle	$79,944.00	$2,645.30	$77,298.70	Washington	28 Aug 1865	Lieutenant Commander Cushing and party

== Replica ==
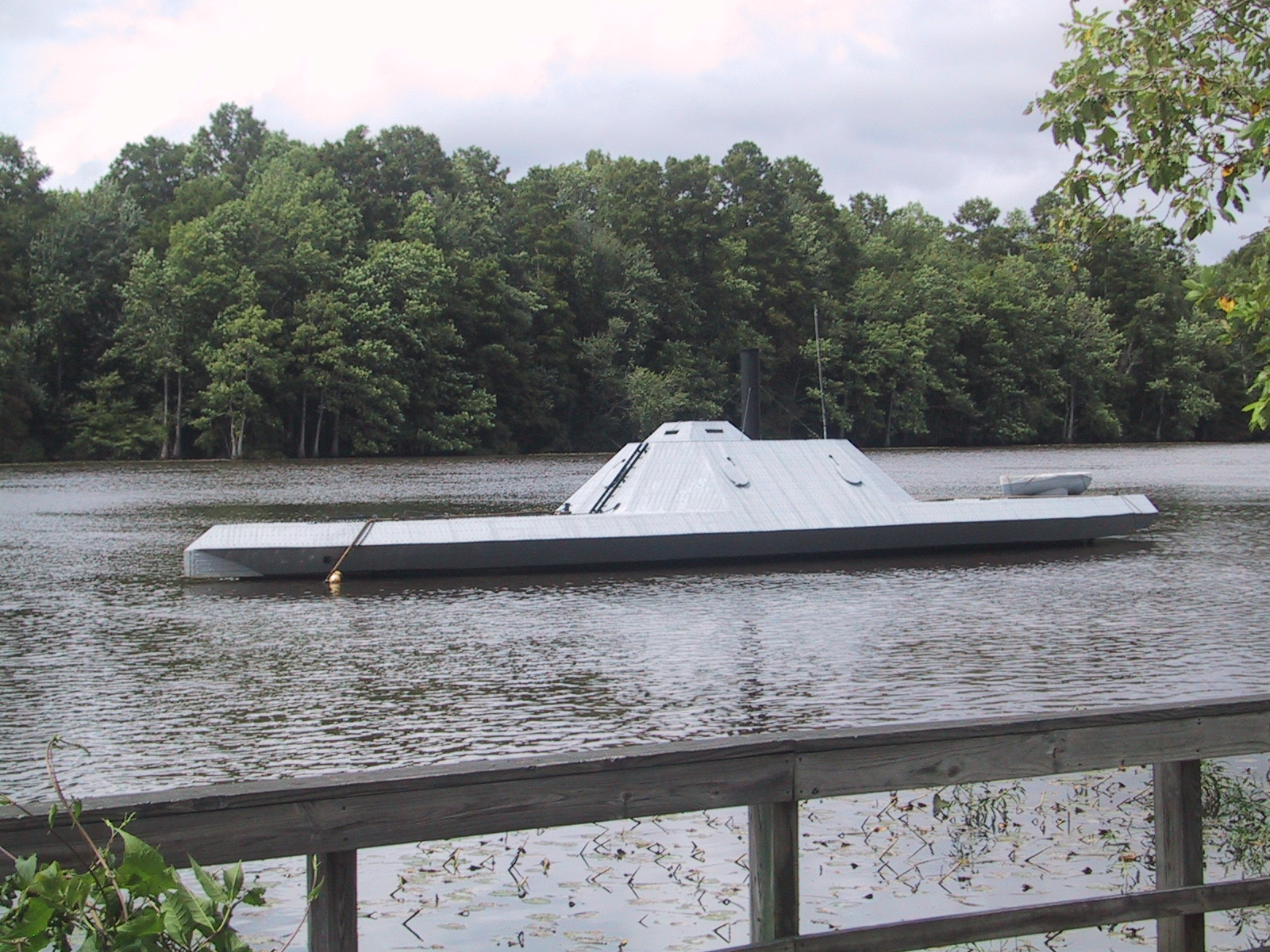
Replica of CSS Albemarle, photographed in 2003

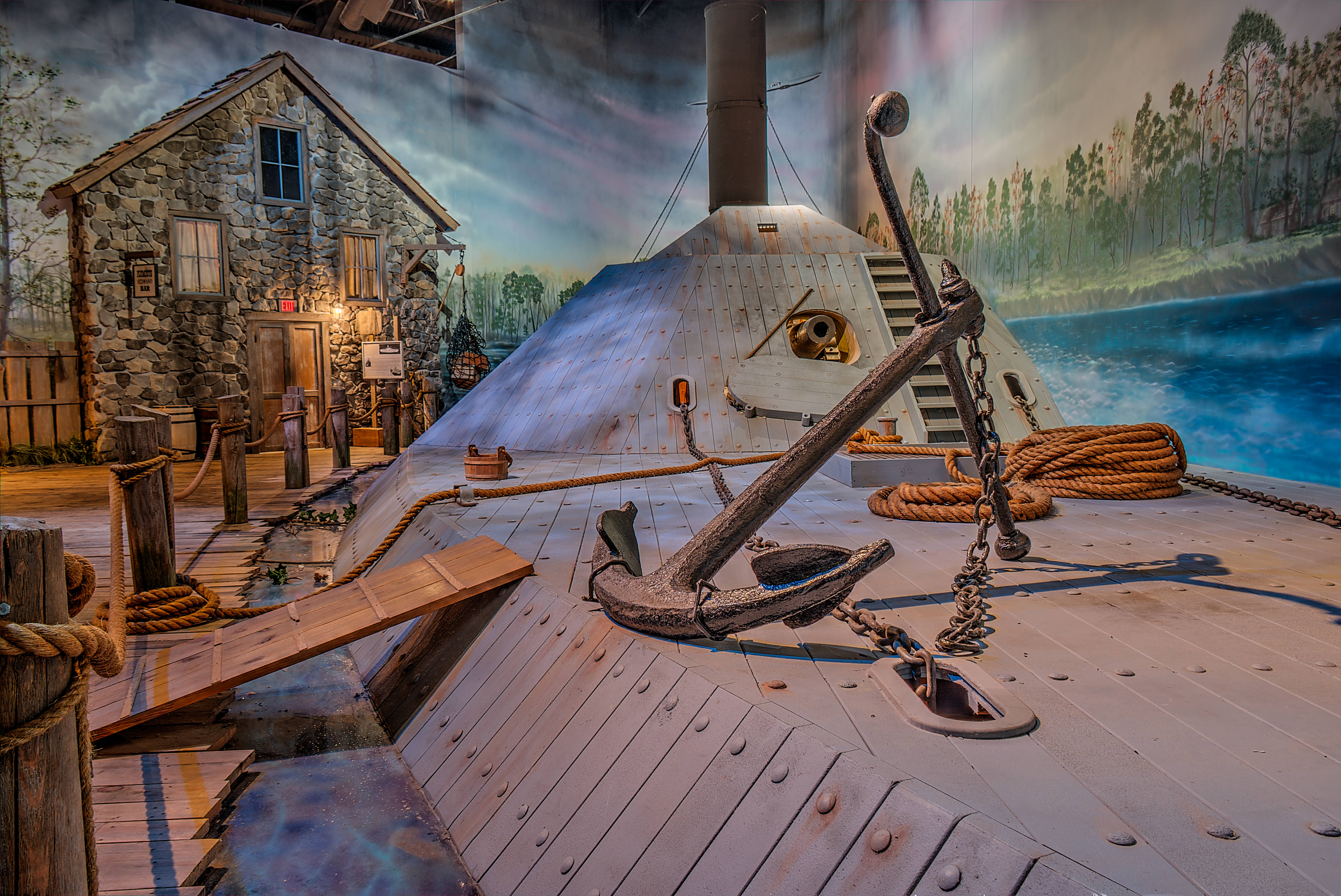
CSS Albemarle exhibit at the National Civil War Naval Museum

A 3/8 scale 63-foot (19 m) replica of Albemarle has been at anchor near the Port O' Plymouth Museum in Plymouth, North Carolina since April 2002. The replica is self-powered and capable of sailing on the river. Each year, the replica takes to the water during Living History Weekend in the last weekend of April.

== See also ==
- Ships captured in the American Civil War
- Bibliography of American Civil War naval history
