= USS Ceres =

Gunboat of the United States Navy

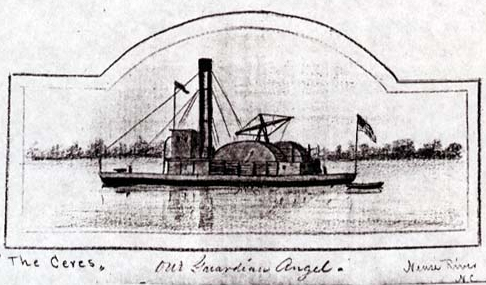
- USS Ceres

History

United States
- Name: USS Ceres
- Launched: 1856 at Keyport, New Jersey
- Acquired: 11 September 1861
- Commissioned: September 1861 at the Washington Navy Yard
- Decommissioned: 14 July 1865 at New York City
- Fate: Sold, 25 October 1865

General characteristics
- Type: Steam gunboat
- Displacement: 150 long tons (150 t)
- Length: 108 ft 4 in (33.02 m)
- Beam: 22 ft 4 in (6.81 m)
- Draft: 6 ft 3 in (1.91 m)
- Propulsion: Steam engine, sidewheel-propelled
- Speed: 9 kn (10 mph; 17 km/h)
- Complement: 45
- Armament: 1 × 30-pounder rifle, 1 × 32-pounder smoothbore gun

USS Ceres was a small 150-long-ton (152 t) steamboat acquired by the Union Navy during the beginning of the American Civil War. She was outfitted as a gunboat and used in the Union blockade of the waterways of the Confederate States of America.

== Service history ==
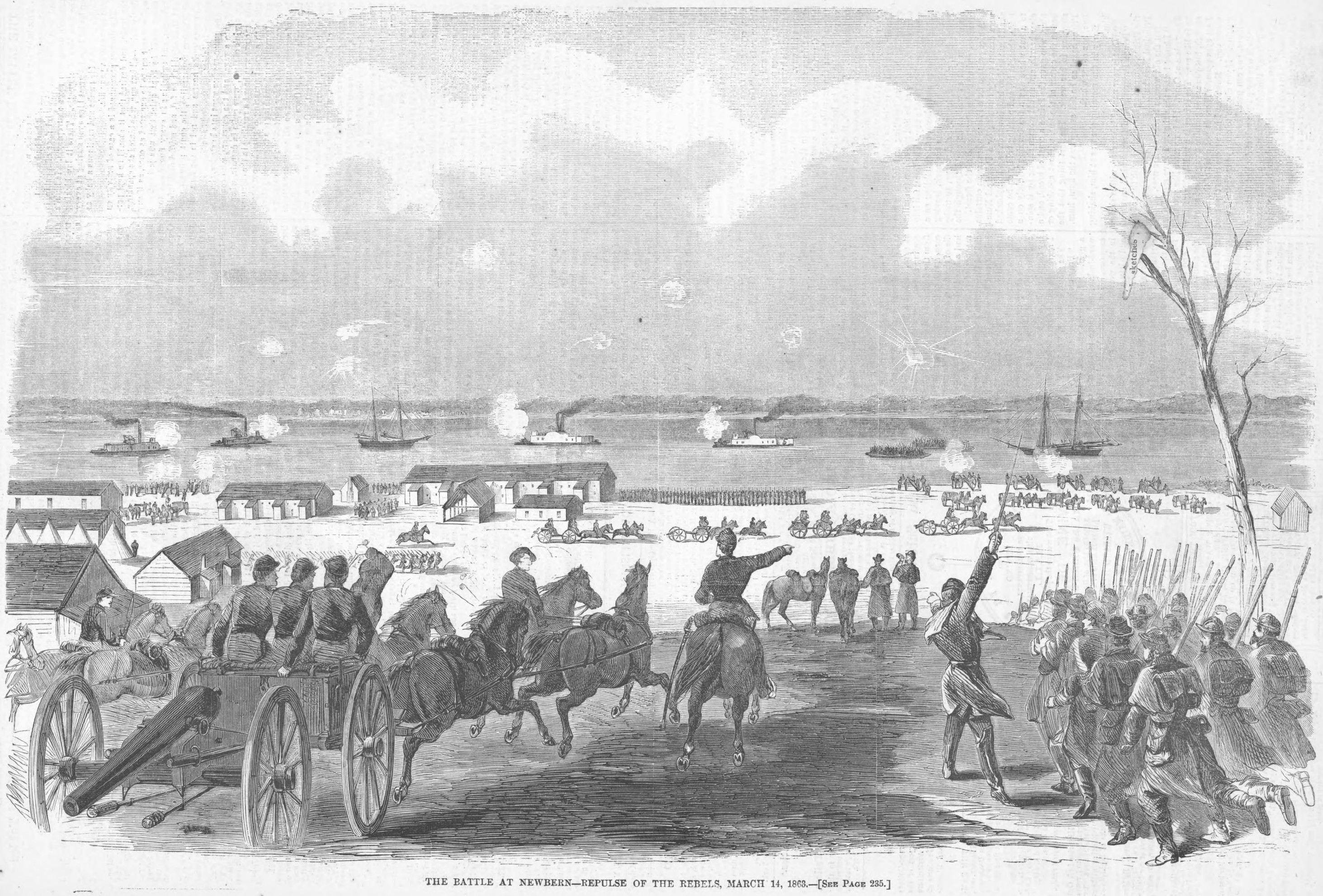
Ceres defending Fort Anderson, March 14, 1863

Ceres, an armed side-wheel merchant steamer, was built at Keyport, New Jersey in 1856. Ceres was purchased by the United States Navy on 11 September 1861, fitted out at the Washington Navy Yard, and commissioned the same month, Acting Master J. L. Elliott in command. Originally assigned to the Potomac Flotilla, Ceres was ordered on 18 September 1861 to report to the North Atlantic Blockading Squadron, and for the remainder of the war, aside from repair periods at Baltimore, Maryland operated in the rivers and sounds of Virginia and North Carolina. Here she maintained the close watch for Confederate States merchantmen through which the blockading forces provided so important a part of the U.S. Navy's contribution in the American Civil War. She was successful in capturing four blockade runners during her service, as well as aiding in the seizure of others.

Another crucial assignment carried out by Ceres' squadron was support for Union Army forces holding or attempting to take coastal positions, as well as providing boats and cover for amphibious operations, raids, and reconnaissance. She took part in the capture of Roanoke Island on 7–8 February 1862, during which she was hit while firing on Confederate shore positions. When nearby Confederate naval ships retired up Albemarle Sound as Roanoke Island fell, Ceres joined in following them, and next took part in the naval engagement off Elizabeth City, North Carolina. During this action, in which one of her men was wounded, she captured CSS Ellis.

Continuing her operations in North Carolinian waters, Ceres took the steamer Wilson on 9 July 1862 while covering the landing of an Army raiding party near Hamilton, North Carolina. Through most of 1863, she protected the forces holding such posts as Fort Anderson at New Bern, North Carolina and the positions near Washington, North Carolina, coming under fire from Confederate batteries on several occasions.

In the lengthy series of attacks around Plymouth, North Carolina, Ceres lost two men killed and six wounded when she was taken under heavy fire from Fort Grey, upriver from Plymouth, on 17 April 1864. Two days later, it was Ceres who gave warning of the approach of the formidable Confederate ram CSS Albemarle, and took part in the first engagement with the ram which followed. On 5 May, her group again was engaged with Albemarle and two other steamers at the Battle of Albemarle Sound. Following the dramatic sinking of Albemarle by Lieutenant William B. Cushing, and later salvage, Ceres towed Albemarle north to Norfolk, Virginia at the close of the war. After a final patrol period off North Carolina, Ceres was decommissioned at New York City on 14 July 1865, and sold on 25 October 1865.
