= CSS Bombshell =

History

Confederate States
- Name: Bombshell
- Commissioned: April 1864
- Decommissioned: May 5, 1864
- Fate: Captured by Union Navy

General characteristics
- Length: 90 ft (27 m)
- Draft: 3 ft 6 in (1.07 m)
- Propulsion: Steam engine
- Complement: 37 officers and men
- Armament: 3 howitzers; 1 × 20 pounder (9 kg) cannon

CSS Bombshell — believed to have been an Erie Canal steamer — was a U.S. Army transport. Bombshell was sunk by the Confederate batteries in Albemarle Sound, North Carolina on April 18, 1864. She was raised by the Confederate forces and taken into the Confederate States Navy under the command of Lieutenant Albert Gallatin Hudgins, CSN. Bombshell was captured at the Battle of Albemarle Sound by USS Mattabesett and USS Sassacus on May 5, 1864 and sent to New York City.
