= USS Roe =

Two ships in the United States Navy have been named USS Roe for Francis Asbury Roe.

- USS Roe (DD-24) was a modified Paulding-class destroyer launched in 1909 and served in World War I. She served in the United States Coast Guard from 1924 to 1930. She was sold in 1934.
- USS Roe (DD-418) was a Sims-class destroyer launched in 1939 and decommissioned in 1945 after serving in World War II.
