= USS Hopi =

Tugboat of the United States Navy

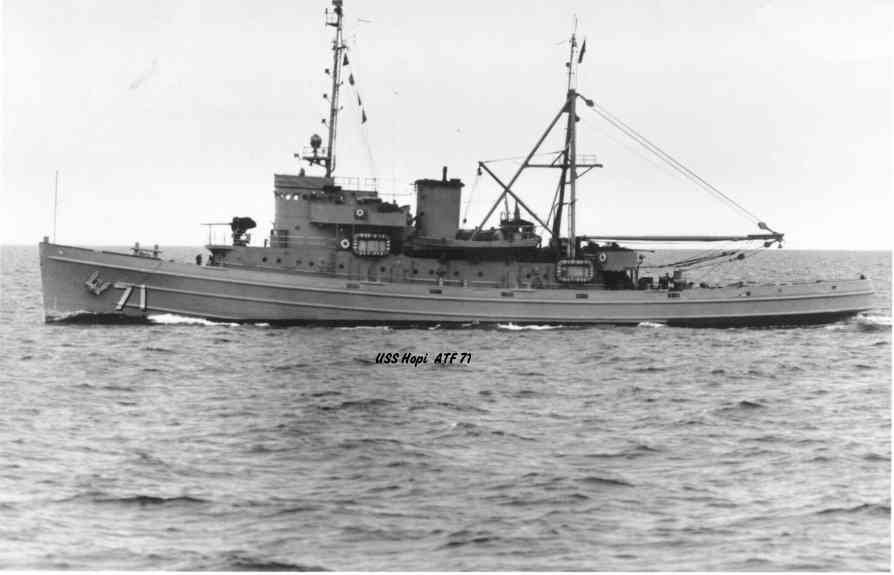
- USS Hopi (AT-71) underway, circa 1940s.

History

United States
- Name: USS Hopi (AT-71)
- Namesake: Hopi
- Builder: Charleston Shipbuilding and Drydock Co.
- Laid down: 5 May 1942
- Launched: 7 September 1942
- Commissioned: 31 March 1943
- Decommissioned: 9 December 1955
- Reclassified: Fleet ocean tug ATF-71, 15 May 1944
- Stricken: 1 February 1963
- Honors and awards: 4 × battle stars for World War II
- Fate: Transferred to Taiwan, renamed ROCS Ta Han (ATF-542), fate unknown

General characteristics
- Class & type: Navajo-class fleet tug
- Displacement: 1,240 long tons (1,260 t)
- Length: 205 ft (62 m)
- Beam: 38 ft 6 in (11.73 m)
- Draft: 15 ft 4 in (4.67 m)
- Propulsion: Diesel-electric; four General Motors 12-278A diesel main engines driving four General Electric generators and three General Motors 3-268A auxiliary services engines; single screw; 3,000 shp (2,237 kW)
- Speed: 16.5 knots (30.6 km/h; 19.0 mph)
- Complement: 85
- Armament: 1 × 3 in (76 mm) gun; 2 × single 40 mm AA guns; 2 × single 20 mm guns AA guns

USS Hopi (AT-71) was a Navajo-class fleet tug constructed for the United States Navy during World War II. Her purpose was to aid ships, usually by towing, on the high seas or in combat or post-combat areas, plus "other duties as assigned." During World War II she was assigned to the Europe-Africa-Middle East Theater where she participated in four campaigns earning four battle stars.

== Description ==
International radio call sign of USS Hopi (AT-71)
November	Uniform	Kilo	Whiskey

Hopi was laid down 5 May 1942 by Charleston Shipbuilding and Drydock Co., Charleston, South Carolina and launched on 7 September 1942. She was commissioned 31 March 1943.

== World War II service ==
After shakedown training in Key West the Hopi left for New York and then was deployed with a convoy for North Africa on 10 June 1943 to join the Europe-Africa-Middle East Theater.

=== Sicilian occupation ===
Upon arrival she was tasked with performing towing services for several days before steaming to Bizerte to join Vice Admiral Hewitt's Western Naval Task Force for the assault on Sicily. Departing Bizerte 8 July with pontoons in tow, Hopi landed them 2 days later and immediately set to work clearing the beaches of damaged landing craft and fighting fires on vessels in the transport areas.

=== Salerno landings ===
She returned to Bizerte 10 August to prepare for the Salerno operation. She sailed early in September and again performed salvage work. On 11 September, USS Savannah (CL-42), while lying-to in the support area awaiting calls for support, received a direct hit on No. 3 turret which left her dead in the water. Hopi and salvage tug Moreno immediately came alongside. Work by these two tugs allowed Savannah to return to Malta that under her own power. On 16 September, HMS Warspite took multiple hits from guided bombs. Hopi and Moreno were able to tow her to Malta without further incident.
