= Högman =

Högman or Hogman is a Swedish surname. Notable people with the surname include:

- Alexander Högman (1721–1802), Swedish master bricklayer
- Berit Högman, Swedish politician and civil servant
- Chris Hogman (born Christofer Högman), Swedish artist
- Karl Johan Högman (1850–1893), Finnish educator and politician, M.P.

== See also ==
- Hodgman
