= USS Roe (DD-24) =

Paulding-class destroyer

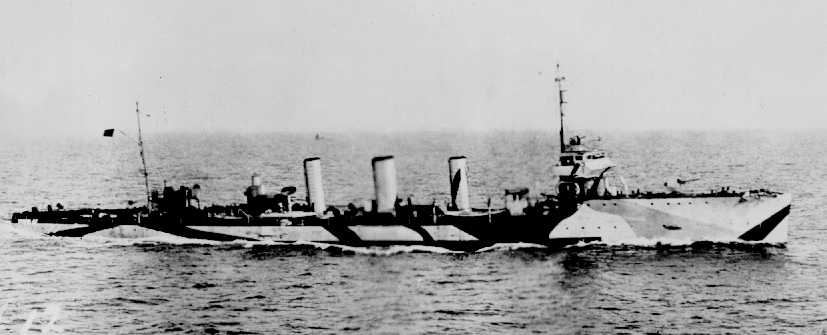
- USS Roe (DD-24) on patrol in 1918. She is painted in "dazzle" camouflage.

History

United States
- Name: Roe
- Namesake: Rear admiral Francis Asbury Roe
- Builder: Newport News Shipbuilding Company, Newport News, Virginia
- Cost: $642,761.30
- Laid down: 19 January 1909
- Launched: 22 August 1910
- Sponsored by: Mrs. Reynold T. Hall
- Commissioned: 17 September 1910
- Decommissioned: 1 December 1919
- Stricken: 28 June 1934
- Identification: Hull symbol:DD-24; Code letters:NTZ
- Fate: transferred to the United States Coast Guard, scrapped 1934

United States
- Name: Roe
- Acquired: 7 June 1924
- Commissioned: 12 January 1928
- Decommissioned: 18 October 1930
- Identification: Hull symbol:CG-18
- Fate: Transferred back to the United States Navy

General characteristics
- Class & type: Paulding-class destroyer
- Displacement: 742 long tons (754 t) normal; 887 long tons (901 t) full load
- Length: 293 ft 10 in (89.56 m)
- Beam: 27 ft (8.2 m)
- Draft: 8 ft 4 in (2.54 m) (mean)
- Installed power: 12,000 ihp (8,900 kW)
- Propulsion: 4 × boilers; 3 × Parsons Direct Drive Turbines; 3 × shafts
- Speed: 29.5 kn (33.9 mph; 54.6 km/h); 29.6 kn (34.1 mph; 54.8 km/h) (Speed on Trial)
- Complement: 4 officers 87 enlisted
- Armament: 5 × 3 in (76 mm)/50 caliber guns; 6 × 18 inch (450 mm) torpedo tubes (3 × 2)

USS Roe (DD-24) was a Paulding-class destroyer in the United States Navy during World War I, and later in the United States Coast Guard designated CG-18. She was the first ship named for Francis Asbury Roe.

Roe was laid down on 18 January 1909 by the Newport News Shipbuilding Company, Newport News, Virginia, launched on 24 July 1909, sponsored by Mrs. Reynold T. Hall, and commissioned on 17 September 1910.

== United States Navy ==
Following commissioning, Roe conducted exercises in the Norfolk, Virginia, area until December with one interruption, a voyage to Newport, Rhode Island, and back in early November. On 17 December, she got underway for Key West and winter exercises in the Gulf of Mexico. With the spring, she returned to Norfolk and until January 1913 remained active off the mid-Atlantic and southern New England sea coasts. From January–April 1913, she participated in maneuvers in the Caribbean, then, in the fall, operated off New England. On 30 October, she arrived at Philadelphia, Pennsylvania, where she was placed in reserve on 3 November. In March 1914, she was assigned to the newly organized Reserve Torpedo Flotilla and until World War I rotated between reserve and active duty with the Atlantic Fleet. During the late summer and fall of 1914, she operated off the mid-Atlantic seaboard, and from February–April 1915, participated in further winter maneuvers in the Caribbean. During the summer, she was off southern New England, and in November, she put into Charleston, South Carolina, where she was given a reduced complement status.

In March 1917, Roe was placed in full commission status. With the new month, April, she was assigned to Squadron 2, Division 5, Patrol Force and ordered to assist Treasury and Labor Department officials at Wilmington, North Carolina, in preventing the destruction or escape of German merchant vessels. On the 6th, as the United States entered World War I, she sent an armed guard aboard Hohenfelde (see Long Beach). During her service in World War I, she was commanded by Captain William A. Hodgman, who received the Navy Cross for his efforts.

At mid-month, Roe was transferred to Newport, where she conducted anti-submarine patrols and carried out escort assignments for six months. On 9 November, she sailed for France where for the next year; she performed coastal patrol and escort duty.

On 5 November 1918, Roe departed Brest for the United States. She arrived at New York City on 1 December and at midmonth she returned to Charleston where she remained until July 1919. She then proceeded to Philadelphia, where she was decommissioned on 1 December and berthed with the Reserve Fleet.

== United States Coast Guard ==
Designated DD-24 on 17 July 1920, Roe was activated in 1924 and transferred to the Treasury Department. From 7 June 1924 – 18 October 1930, she was operated by the United States Coast Guard. Based in Stapleton, New York, she served as part of the Rum Patrol.

On her return to the Navy, she was again berthed at League Island where she remained until sold for scrap on 2 May 1934 in accordance with the London Naval Treaty.
