= William Hodgman =

William Hodgman may refer to:

- William A. Hodgman (1884–1967), US naval officer
- William Hodgman (prosecutor), American lawyer and prosecutor
- Will Hodgman (born 1969), Tasmanian politician
- Bill Hodgman (1909–1997), Tasmanian politician
