= USS LST-28 =

1943 LST-1-class tank landing ship

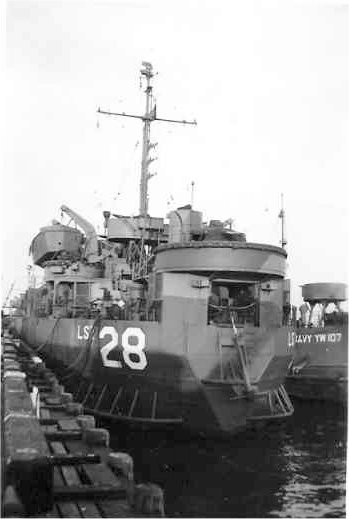
- USS LST-28 moored pierside, with YW-107 alongside, date and location unknown.

History

United States
- Name: LST-28
- Builder: Dravo Corporation, Pittsburgh, Pennsylvania
- Laid down: 8 December 1942
- Launched: 19 April 1943
- Sponsored by: Mrs. Michael Torick
- Commissioned: 19 June 1943
- Decommissioned: 16 August 1946
- Stricken: 29 October 1946
- Identification: Hull symbol: LST-28; Code letters: NDWJ
- Honors and awards: 2 × battle stars
- Fate: Sold for scrapping, 19 May 1948

General characteristics
- Type: LST-1-class tank landing ship
- Displacement: 4,080 long tons (4,145 t) full load; 2,160 long tons (2,190 t) landing
- Length: 328 ft (100 m) oa
- Beam: 50 ft (15 m)
- Draft: Full load: 8 ft 2 in (2.49 m) forward; 14 ft 1 in (4.29 m) aft; Landing at 2,160 t: 3 ft 11 in (1.19 m) forward; 9 ft 10 in (3.00 m) aft
- Installed power: 2 × 900 hp (670 kW) Electro-Motive Diesel 12-567A diesel engines; 1,700 shp (1,300 kW)
- Propulsion: 1 × Falk main reduction gears; 2 × Propellers
- Speed: 12 kn (22 km/h; 14 mph)
- Range: 24,000 nmi (44,000 km; 28,000 mi) at 9 kn (17 km/h; 10 mph) while displacing 3,960 long tons (4,024 t)
- Boats & landing craft carried: 2 or 6 x LCVPs
- Capacity: 2,100 tons oceangoing maximum; 350 tons main deckload
- Troops: 16 officers, 147 enlisted men
- Complement: 13 officers, 104 enlisted men
- Armament: Varied, ultimate armament; 2 × twin 40 mm (1.57 in) Bofors guns; 4 × single 40 mm Bofors guns; 12 × 20 mm (0.79 in) Oerlikon cannons

Service record
- Operations: Normandy landings (6–25 June 1944)
- Awards: American Campaign Medal; European–African–Middle Eastern Campaign Medal; World War II Victory Medal

USS LST-28 was a United States Navy LST-1-class tank landing ship used exclusively in the Europe-Africa-Middle East Theater during World War II. Like many of her class, she was not named and is properly referred to by her hull designation.

== Construction ==
LST-28 was laid down on 8 December 1942, at Pittsburgh, Pennsylvania, by the Dravo Corporation; launched on 19 April 1943; sponsored by Mrs. Michael Torick; and commissioned on 19 June 1943.

== Service history ==
There are records that indicate she traveled from Oran, Algeria, joining Convoy MKS 46 sometime after 9 April 1944, arriving in Gibraltar on 21 April 1944. She departed Gibraltar on 22 April 1944, with Convoy MKS 46G to rendezvous with Convoy SL 155 on April 23, 1944, arriving in Liverpool on 3 May 1944.

She participated in the Normandy invasion, June 1944.

She sailed from St. Helen's Roads, 21 March 1945, arriving in Le Havre, the same day, in Convoy WVL 109. She again left St. Helen's Roads, on 30 April 1945, arriving in Le Havre, the next day, 1 May 1945, in Convoy WVC 138.

== Postwar career ==
LST-28 was decommissioned on 16 August 1946, and was struck from the Navy list on 29 October 1946. On 19 May 1948, she was sold to George H. Nutman, of Brooklyn, New York, for scrapping.

== Awards ==
LST-28 earned two battle stars for her World War II service.

== Bibliography ==
- "LST-28". Dictionary of American Naval Fighting Ships. Naval History and Heritage Command. 30 July 2015. This article incorporates text from this source, which is in the public domain.
- "USS LST-28". NavSource. 10 March 2017.
- "Convoy MKS.46". Arnold Hague Convoy Database.
- "Convoy MKS.46G". Arnold Hague Convoy Database.
- "Convoy SL.155/MKS.46". Arnold Hague Convoy Database.
- "Convoy WVC.138". Arnold Hague Convoy Database.
- "Convoy WVL.109". Arnold Hague Convoy Database.
