= USS Roe (DD-418) =

Sims-class destroyer

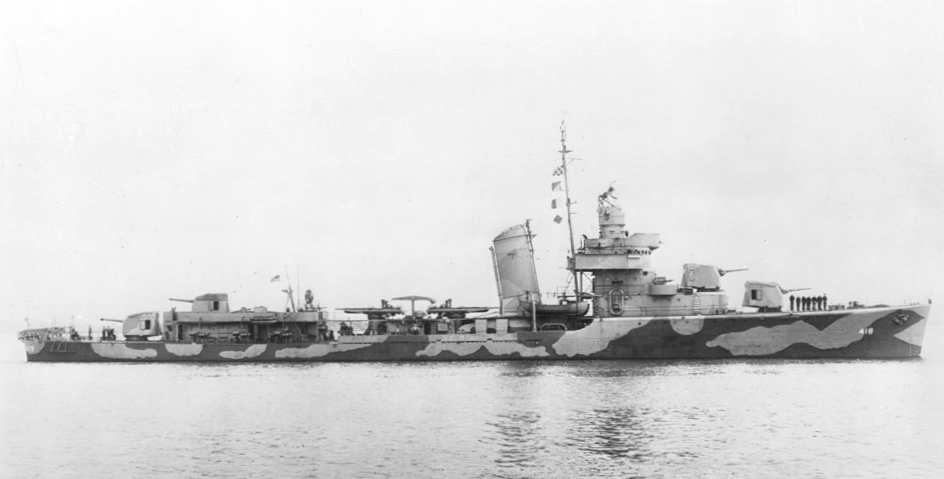
- IUSS Roe (DD-418)

History

United States
- Builder: Charleston Navy Yard
- Laid down: 23 April 1938
- Launched: 21 June 1939
- Commissioned: 5 January 1940
- Decommissioned: 30 October 1945
- Stricken: 16 November 1945
- Honors and awards: American Defense Service Medal ("Fleet" clasp, "A" device), Asiatic-Pacific Campaign Medal, European-African-Middle Eastern Campaign Medal, World War II Victory Medal
- Fate: Sold August 1947, broken up for scrap

General characteristics
- Class & type: Sims-class destroyer
- Displacement: 1,570 long tons (1,600 t) (std); 2,211 long tons (2,246 t) (full)
- Length: 348 ft 3 1/4 in (106.2 m)
- Beam: 36 ft 1 in (11.0 m)
- Draft: 13 ft 4.5 in (4.1 m)
- Propulsion: High-pressure super-heated boilers; Geared turbines with twin screws; 50,000 hp (37,000 kW)
- Speed: 35 knots (65 km/h; 40 mph)
- Range: 3,660 nmi (6,780 km; 4,210 mi) at 20 kn (37 km/h; 23 mph)
- Complement: 192 (10 officers/182 enlisted)
- Armament: 5 × 5 inch/38, in single mounts; 4 × .50 caliber/90, in single mounts; 8 × 21 inch torpedo tubes in two quadruple mounts; 2 × depth charge track, 10 depth charges

USS Roe (DD-418) was a World War II-era Sims-class destroyer in the service of the United States Navy, named after Rear Admiral Francis Asbury Roe.

Roe was laid down on 23 April 1938 by the Charleston Navy Yard; launched on 21 June 1939; sponsored by Mrs. Eleanor Roe Hilton; and commissioned on 5 January 1940, Lieutenant Commander R. M. Scruggs in command.

== Service history ==
=== Inter-War Period ===
Following shakedown, Roe conducted exercises along the east coast and in the Pacific. In the spring of 1941, she returned to the east coast and, during the summer remained primarily in the mid-Atlantic seaboard area. In the fall, she moved northward, to Naval Station Argentia, to escort merchant convoys between Newfoundland and Iceland.

=== World War II ===
On that duty when the United States entered World War II, Roe headed south in January 1942, patrolled the approaches to Bermuda and to Norfolk, Virginia, and in mid-February entered New York Harbor, where she resumed North Atlantic convoy runs. Arriving off Iceland on 3 March, she remained until midmonth, in port and on patrol off that island and in the Denmark Strait. Toward the end of the month, Roe returned to New York. In April, she escorted ships to Panama, then spent May in New England waters. In June, she completed another North Atlantic run, this time to the United Kingdom, and in July, she screened larger ships in coastal and Caribbean Sea training operations.

In mid-August the destroyer again pointed her bow south. Into October she operated between Trinidad and ports in Brazil, then returned to Norfolk to prepare for Operation Torch, the landings in North Africa.

Assigned to the Northern Attack Group, Roe screened the transports to Mehedia, then provided gunfire support for the troops as they pushed to take Port Lyautey in the Sebou River and the Salé airfield. She arrived off the assault area on the night of 7/8 November, ahead of the main group, and with her SG radar, attempted to locate the beacon submarine, Shad. Unsuccessful, she fixed her own position relative to the jetties and beaches of the landing area, and returned to the main force to help guide it to the transport area. During the early morning landings, she acted as control destroyer off Blue and Yellow beaches, then shifted to gunfire support duties. Shortly after sunrise she assisted Savannah in temporarily silencing hostile fire from the Kasba, an old citadel situated on a cliff commanding the mouth of the Sebou.

Until 15 November, Roe remained in the area to provide gunfire support and screen the larger ships. She then turned westward, arriving back at Hampton Roads, Virginia on 26 November. In the winter and the following spring, 1943, Roe again performed escort work with tanker runs to Gulf of Mexico and Caribbean oil ports and resupply and reinforcement convoys to Casablanca. On 10 June, she departed New York for the Mediterranean and her second assault, the Allied invasion of Sicily.

Arriving at Oran toward the end of the month, she continued on to Bizerte, whence she steamed north with the JOSS force for Licata on 8 July. On 9 July, she took up her position in the fire support area off beach Red, near the Torre di Gaffe beach. Early on 10 July, she and Swanson moved toward Porto Empedocle, an Italian motor torpedo boat base guarded by a minefield 24 miles west of Licata, to investigate small pips which had registered on their radar screens. As both destroyers prepared to open fire on the "enemy" boats, Roe swerved to avoid the minefield and, at the same time, to fall in astern of Swanson. Her speed, however, exceeded Swanson's and, just before 0300, Roe hit Swanson at right angles on the port side shearing off a portion of her own bow and causing Swanson's fireroom to flood. Both ships went dead in the water. Fortunately, by 0500, both were mobile.

As daylight increased, the Luftwaffe attempted to finish the damaged ships. The destroyers defended themselves and in the process shot down one Junkers Ju 88 with 13 rounds of proximity-influence-fused 5 inch fire to prove the worth of the new fuse in antiaircraft fighting.

Following temporary patching at Oran, Roe returned to New York for permanent repairs. In mid-September, she resumed transatlantic convoy duty and completed two runs to North Africa before the end of the year.

=== Convoys escorted ===
Convoy	Escort Group	Dates	Notes
HX 155		18-25 Oct 1941	from Newfoundland to Iceland prior to US declaration of war
ON 31		4-15 Nov 1941	from Iceland to Newfoundland prior to US declaration of war
HX 161		23 Nov-3 Dec 1941	from Newfoundland to Iceland prior to US declaration of war
ON 43		11-15 Dec 1941	from Iceland to Newfoundland

=== Pacific theatre ===
With the new year, 1944, Roe was transferred to the Pacific. Departing New York on 26 January, she transited the Panama Canal and traversed the Pacific to report to Commander, TF 76 at Cape Sudest on 12 March. From there, and other New Guinea ports and anchorages, she escorted 7th Phib Force ships transporting Allied troops up the coast and through neighboring islands, and provided gunfire support in target areas. From 16 to 21 March, she supported operations on Manus Island. In early April, she transported Army personnel from Manus to Rambutyo Island, then prepared for the landings at Humboldt Bay, which she supported on 22 April. In mid-May, she assisted the offensive in the Toem-Wakde area; then, at the end of the month, screened LSTs to Biak. Fire support duty and escort of reinforcements and supplies to Biak continued into June. On 29 April, she provided call-fire support for Army units fighting northeast of the Driniumor River. Then, in July, the destroyer shifted to Noemfoor to conduct a prelanding bombardment and to give postlanding support fire.

Relieved at midmonth, Roe departed the Admiralties and steamed for Majuro, where she joined the 5th Fleet. For the next 6 weeks, she served as an aircraft rescue ship in areas off Maloelap, Wotje, Mili, and Jaluit. Patrol, picket, and escort duties then kept her shuttling between and amongst the Marshall and Mariana Islands, primarily the latter, until early December when she joined TG 94.9 for a bombardment of Iwo Jima.

Completing the assignment on 8 December, the force returned to Saipan, whence Roe conducted two search and rescue missions and one mercy run, carrying a doctor to a convoy bound for Saipan, before heading out for further strikes against Iwo Jima on 24 December and 27 December. On 24 December, Roe sank a small trawler and, with Case, sent to the bottom another ship, believed to have been a destroyer converted for fast transport service. On 27 December, she destroyed several small craft and damaged buildings and antiaircraft installations in and near the island's west boat basin.

Another strike on the Volcano and Bonin Islands during the first week in January 1945, was followed by availability at Ulithi and resumption of patrol and escort work from Guam. In late April, she returned to the Volcano-Bonin area for radar picket and search and rescue operations during air strikes against the Japanese home islands. At the end of May she resumed operations in the Marianas and in June she received orders to the west coast.

Roe arrived in San Francisco Bay on 29 July, and was undergoing a yard overhaul when the war ended on 14 August. Then designated for inactivation, Roe was decommissioned on 30 October 1945 and was struck from the Navy list on 16 November. She was sold in August 1947.

== Awards ==
Roe earned six battle stars during World War II.
