= USS Savannah (CL-42) =

Brooklyn-class light cruiser

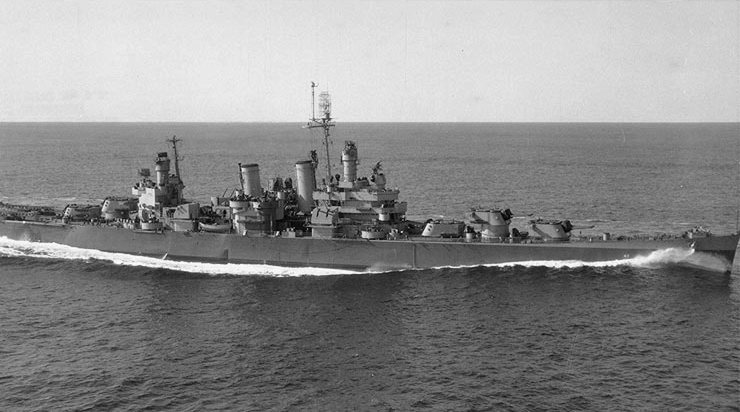
- USS Savannah (October 1944)

History

United States
- Name: Savannah
- Namesake: City of Savannah, Georgia
- Ordered: 16 June 1933
- Awarded: 3 August 1933
- Builder: New York Shipbuilding Corporation, Camden, New Jersey
- Cost: $11,677,000 (contract price)
- Laid down: 31 May 1934
- Launched: 8 May 1937
- Sponsored by: Miss Jayne Maye Bowden
- Commissioned: 10 March 1938
- Decommissioned: 3 February 1947
- Stricken: 1 March 1959
- Identification: Hull symbol:CL-42; Code letters:NAQL
- Honors and awards: 3 × battle stars
- Fate: Sold for scrap 6 January 1960

General characteristics (as built)
- Class & type: Brooklyn-class cruiser
- Displacement: 10,000 long tons (10,160 t) (estimated as design); 9,767 long tons (9,924 t) (standard); 12,207 long tons (12,403 t) (max)
- Length: 600 ft (180 m) oa; 608 ft 4 in (185.42 m) lwl
- Beam: 61 ft 7 in (18.77 m)
- Draft: 19 ft 9 in (6.02 m) (mean); 24 ft (7.3 m) (max)
- Installed power: 8 × Steam boilers; 100,000 shp (75,000 kW)
- Propulsion: 4 × geared turbines; 4 × screws
- Speed: 32.5 kn (37.4 mph; 60.2 km/h)
- Complement: 868 officers and enlisted
- Armament: 15 × 6 in (150 mm)/47 caliber guns (5x3); 8 × 5 in (130 mm)/25 caliber anti-aircraft guns; 8 × caliber 0.50 in (13 mm) machine guns
- Armor: Belt: 3 1/4–5 in (83–127 mm); Deck: 2 in (51 mm); Barbettes: 6 in (150 mm); Turrets: 1 1/4–6 in (32–152 mm); Conning tower: 2 1/4–5 in (57–127 mm)
- Aircraft carried: 4 × SOC Seagull floatplanes
- Aviation facilities: 2 × stern catapults

General characteristics (1944)
- Beam: 61 ft 7 in (18.77 m); 69 ft (21 m) (1944 refit)
- Armament: 15 × 6 in (150 mm)/47 caliber guns (5x3); 4 × twin 5 in (130 mm)/38 caliber anti-aircraft guns; 4 × quad 40 mm (1.6 in) Bofors anti-aircraft guns; 6 × twin 40 mm (1.6 in) Bofors anti-aircraft guns; 12 × single 20 mm (0.79 in) Oerlikon anti-aircraft cannons

USS Savannah (CL-42) was a light cruiser of the Brooklyn-class that served in World War II in the Atlantic and Mediterranean theatres of operation. Savannah conducted Neutrality Patrols (1941) and wartime patrols in the Atlantic and Caribbean (1942), and supported the invasion of French North Africa in Operation Torch (November 1942). She sought German-supporting blockade runners off the east coast of South America (1943), and supported the Allied landings on Sicily and at Salerno (1943). Off Salerno on 11 September 1943, a German radio-controlled Fritz X glide-bomb caused extensive casualties aboard and serious damage to Savannah, requiring emergency repairs in Malta and permanent repairs at the Philadelphia Naval Shipyard. After repairs and upgrades, she served in the task force that carried President Roosevelt to the Yalta Conference in early 1945.

== Construction and launch ==
Savannah was laid down on 31 May 1934 by the New York Shipbuilding Corporation in Camden, New Jersey; launched on 8 May 1937; sponsored by Miss Jayne Maye Bowden, the niece of Senator Richard B. Russell, Jr., of Georgia; and commissioned in the Philadelphia Naval Shipyard on 10 March 1938, with Captain Robert C. Giffen in command.

== Inter-war period ==
Following a shakedown cruise to Cuba and Haiti in the spring, Savannah returned to Philadelphia on 3 June for alterations followed by final trials off Rockland, Maine. This cruiser, prepared to protect American nationals should war break out in Europe, steamed out from Philadelphia bound for England on 26 September, and she reached Portsmouth on 4 October. However, the Munich Agreement had postponed the war, so Savannah returned to Norfolk on 18 October. Following winter maneuvers in the Caribbean Sea, Savannah visited her namesake city, Savannah, Georgia, from 12 to 20 April 1939. She got underway from Norfolk on 26 May; transited the Panama Canal on 1 June; and arrived at San Diego on the 17th. Her homeport was soon shifted to Long Beach, California.

Savannah arrived at Pearl Harbor on 21 May 1940, and then she conducted battle readiness and training operations in Hawaiian waters until 8 November. On 8 August Andrew C. Bennett was given command of the ship. Savannah returned to Long Beach on 14 November, and soon thereafter, she was overhauled at the Mare Island Navy Yard in San Francisco Bay. Savannah steamed back into Pearl Harbor on 27 January 1941 and remained there on the U.S. Navy's Hawaiian Sea Frontier until 19 May, when she set course back to the Panama Canal and cruised to Boston via Cuba, arriving on 17 June 1941.

=== The Neutrality Patrol ===
As the flagship of Cruiser Division 8 (CruDiv 8), Savannah conducted Neutrality Patrols in waters ranging south to Cuba and back up the seaboard to the Virginia Capes. On 25 August 1941, she got underway from Norfolk to patrol in the South Atlantic as far as Trindade and Martim Vaz in the screen of the aircraft carrier Wasp. The task group then swept north from Bermuda to NS Argentia, Newfoundland, where Savannah arrived on 23 September. During the next eight weeks, the cruiser helped cover British merchantmen and Allied convoys to within a few hundred miles of the British Isles, replenishing at Casco Bay, Maine, or at New York City.

== World War II ==
=== North Atlantic operations ===
Savannah was in New York Harbor when the Japanese attacked Pearl Harbor on 7 December 1941. She steamed that same day toward Casco Bay, Maine, and from there she steamed via Bermuda to Brazil, arriving at Recife on 12 January 1942. She joined the screen of the aircraft carrier Ranger, in patrolling the Atlantic Ocean north of Bermuda. This island became the cruiser's temporary base while she watched over Vichy French warships based at Martinique and Guadeloupe in the French West Indies. Savannah departed from Shelly Bay, Bermuda, on 7 June, and entered the Boston Navy Yard two days later for an overhaul. This was completed by 15 August. Savannah received a new commander, Leon S. Fiske, on 12 June. Savannah next steamed to readiness exercises in Chesapeake Bay that would prepare her for the invasion of North Africa.

=== Invasion of North Africa ===
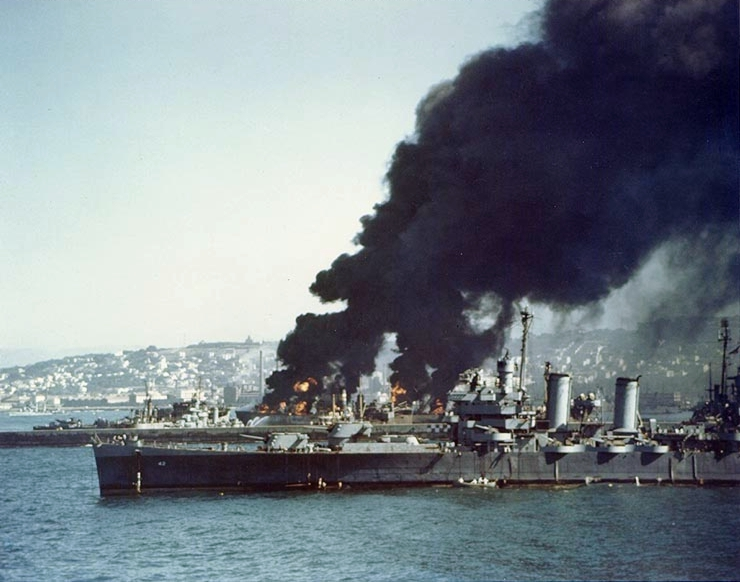
USS Savannah in Algiers, 16 July 1943, near burning Liberty ships.

Savannah became a unit of Admiral H. Kent Hewitt's Western Naval Task Force which would land some 35,000 Army troops and 250 tanks at three different points on the Atlantic coast of French Morocco. As part of the Northern Attack Group, commanded by Rear Admiral Monroe Kelly, Savannah departed from Norfolk on 24 October 1942, and then rendezvoused with the Western Naval Task Force four days later at a point about 450 mi (720 km) south southeast of Cape Race. The Task Force, including the outer screen, covered an area approximately 20-30 mi (30–50 km), making it the greatest warship fleet to be sent out by the United States up to that time. Shortly before midnight on the night of 7 – 8 November 1942, three separate task groups closed in on three different points on the Moroccan coast to begin Operation Torch. Savannah's Northern Attack Group was to land Brigadier General Lucian K. Truscott's 9,099 officers and men, including 65 light tanks, on five widely separated beaches on either side of Mehedia. Their objectives were the Port Lyautey city and its all-weather airfield, the Wadi Sebou, and the Salé airfield.

On the morning of 8 November 1942, Savannah commenced firing against Vichy guns near the Kasbah, which had been firing on the Army troop's landing boats. She also temporarily silenced a battery which had opened up on the destroyer Roe, enabling her to avoid a disaster. By the next morning, Savannah's 6 in (150 mm) guns had scored a direct hit on one of the two 5.4 in (140 mm) artillery guns in the fortress of Kasbah and had silenced the other. During that same day, Savannah's scout planes started a new phase of warfare by successfully bombing some tank columns with their depth charges, whose fuses had been set to detonate on impact. The scout planes, maintaining about eight hours of flight time daily, struck at other shore targets, and they also kept up antisubmarine patrols. Savannah's warplanes located an enemy battery that had been firing on the destroyer Dallas, and eliminated the battery with two well-placed depth charges. This action aided Dallas in winning the Presidential Unit Citation for safely landing a United States Army Raider Battalion on the obstacle-strewn Wadi Sebou, just off the airport near Port Lyautey.

Savannah's scout planes again bombed and strafed enemy tanks on the Rabat Road on the morning of 10 November 1942. Throughout this day, her gunfire aided the Army's advance. Hostilities fittingly ended on Armistice Day, 11 November. Four days later, Savannah headed for home, and she reached Norfolk on 30 November. After brief repairs following her combat missions, at New York City, Savannah steamed on 25 December to join the U.S. Navy's South Atlantic Patrol, arriving at Recife, Brazil, on 7 January 1943. Robert W. Carey was named commander on 17 February.

=== South Atlantic patrol ===
Savannah's primary mission off Brazil was the destruction of any Nazi German blockade runners spotted in the South Atlantic Ocean. Teamed with the new U.S. Navy escort carrier Santee, plus a screen of destroyers, Savannah put to sea on 12 January 1943 on a long patrol that resulted in no combat with the enemy. Savannah went back into Recife Harbor on 15 February, and next, she steamed out again to search for blockade runners on the 21st. On 11 March 1943, she left the task group along with Eberle to investigate a ship that had been sighted by an aircraft from Santee.

Kota Tjandi, a former Dutch ship called Karin by her Kriegsmarine crew, was brought to a halt by shots fired across her bow by the two American warships. Just as a boarding party from Eberle arrived alongside, powerful time bombs, planted just before Karin's lifeboats got underway, exploded. Eleven sailors of the boarding party were killed, but one of Savannah's boat rescued three men from the water. Savannah took 72 German sailors on board, and quartered them below decks as prisoners-of-war. Savannah returned to New York Harbor on 28 March 1943, where she was overhauled in preparation for her next assignment in the Mediterranean Sea.

=== Invasion of Sicily ===
Savannah departed from Norfolk on 10 May 1943 to protect Army troop transports en route to Oran, Algeria. She arrived there on 23 May, and then began preparing for Operation Husky, the amphibious landings on the southern coast of Sicily near Gela. The cliffy coast there was topped by heavy coastal defense batteries, and no landing place could be found besides a 5,000 yd (4,600 m) stretch of shore about 1 mi (2 km) east of the mouth of the Gela River. Poised on the plateau above the beach was the Luftwaffe's Hermann Göring Division, ready to strike back against any amphibious landing, along with other German and Italian troops.

Savannah provided naval gun fire support to the American 1st Infantry Division's "Rangers" before dawn on 10 July 1943. As soon as the first light of dawn appeared, Savannah launched two scout planes. Luftwaffe Messerschmitt Bf 109s intercepted them, with fatal results. Lieutenant C. A. Anderson was killed in flight, although his radioman, Edward J. True, was able to land the riddled plane on the sea. He was picked up shortly after their airplane sank into the sea. Three of the Savannah's four scout planes were shot down on that day.

On the morning of 11 July 1943, Savannah was the first warship to respond to a call for naval gunfire at two points on a road leading into Gela. She knocked out several tanks before shifting her fire to the Butera road to aid advancing American infantry soldiers. Soon friend and foe became so enmeshed in the battle, that her naval gunfire could no longer intervene. Savannah destroyed more tanks later in the afternoon, however, and next she finished out the remaining hours of daylight by helping the Army Rangers in repelling an Italian infantry attack. The next morning, Savannah supported the Army troops with more than 500 rounds of six-inch shells as they advanced toward Butera. That day, Savannah's doctors and hospital corpsmen also gave medical care to 41 wounded infantrymen, while the warship bombarded enemy troop concentrations far inland, and also shelled their artillery batteries high in the hills.

On 13 July 1943, Savannah had but one call for naval gunfire support. She answered by hurling several salvos on the hill town of Butera. Before the 1st Infantry Division pressed on into the interior, it thanked Savannah for crushing three infantry attacks and silencing four artillery batteries, as well as for demoralizing the Italian troops by the effect of her fire. On the next day, Savannah steamed towards Algiers. Savannah returned to Sicily on 19 July 1943 to support the American 7th Army's drive along the eastern and northern coasts of Sicily. On 30 July, carrying the pennant of Rear Admiral Lyal A. Davidson, Savannah arrived at Palermo Harbor on the north coast of Sicily to provide daily fire support. Her guns helped to repel enemy aircraft raiding the harbor from 1–4 August. On 8 August, her task force supported the landing of the 30th Regimental Combat Team, including army artillery and tanks, on a beach nine miles east of Monte Fratello.

=== Invasion of Salerno ===
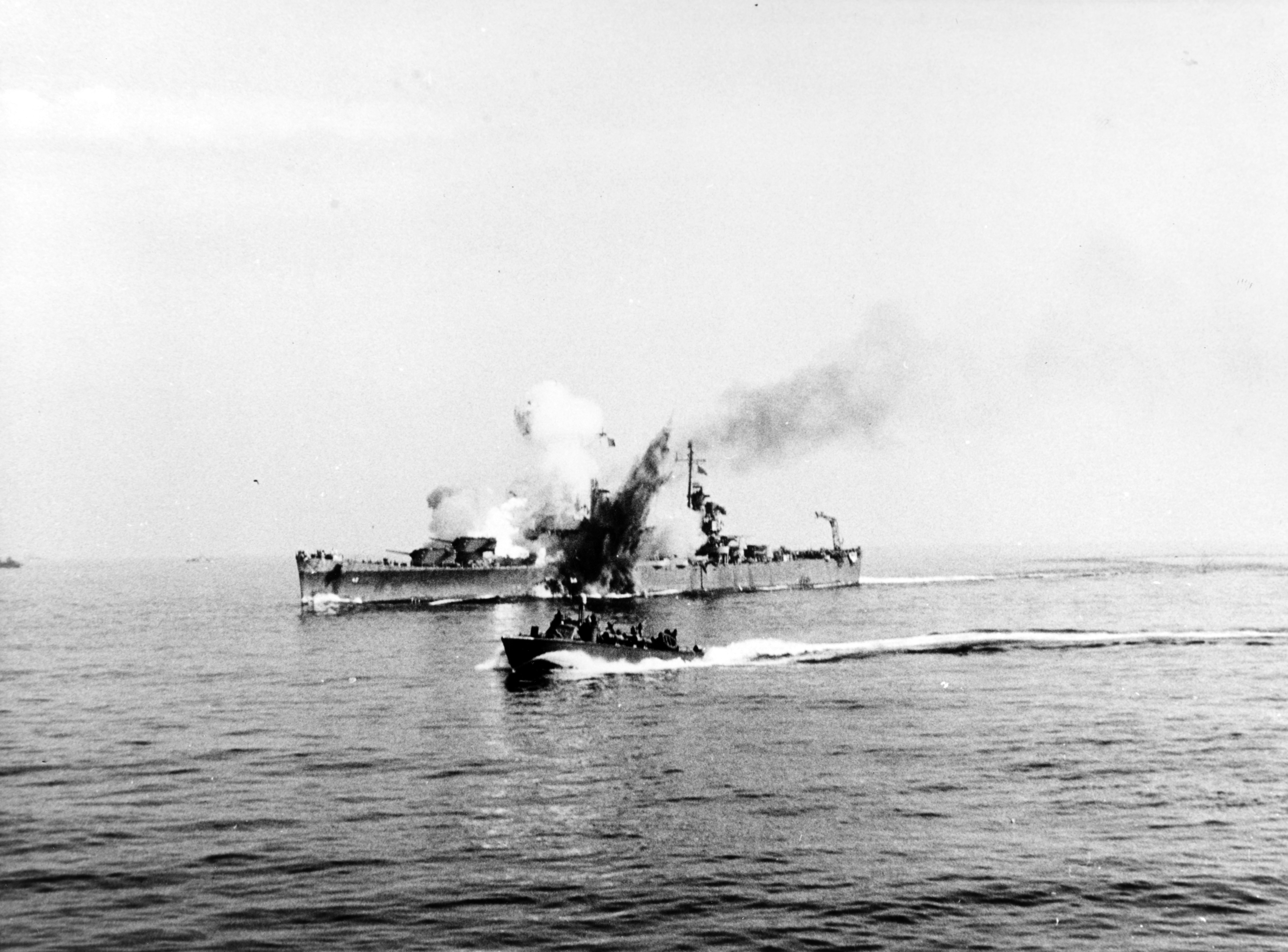
Turret #3 of Savannah is hit by a German Fritz-X radio-controlled bomb, while supporting Allied forces ashore during the Salerno operation, 11 September 1943

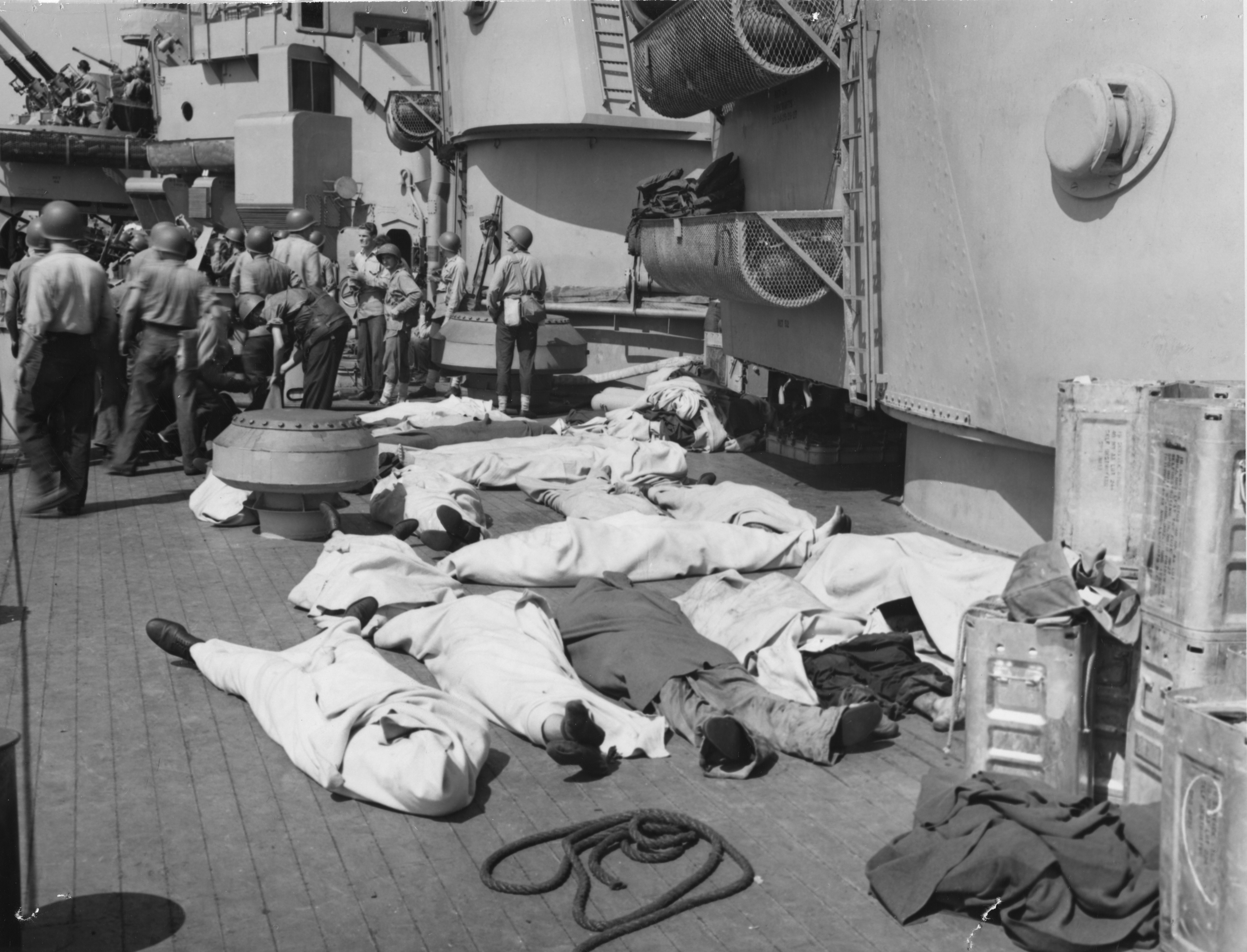
Clean blankets cover some of the dead on 11 September 1943

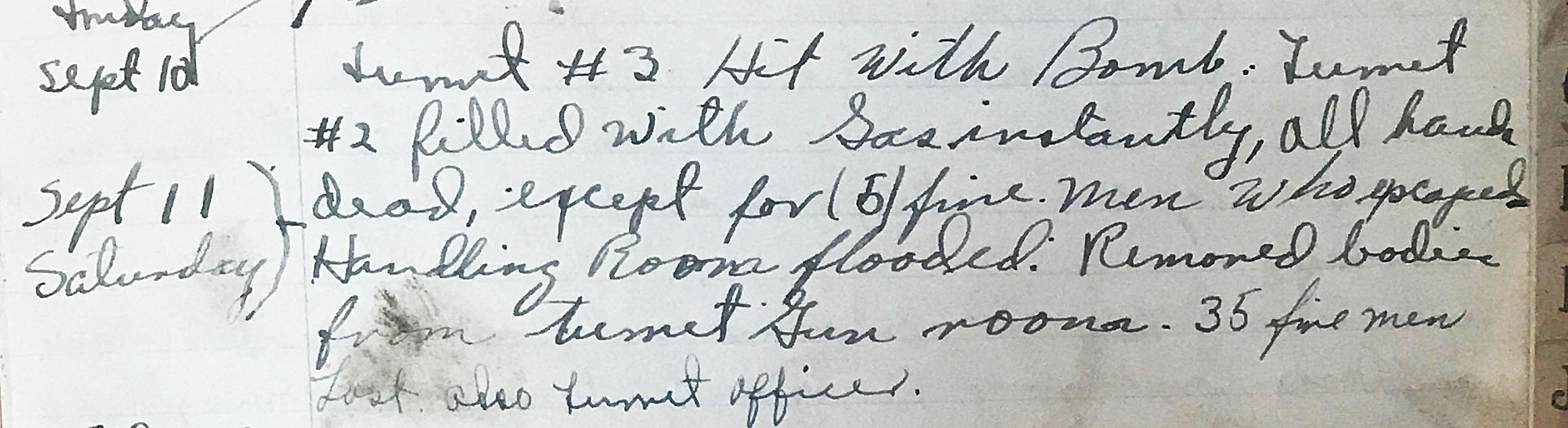
11 September 1943 logbook entry for Turret #2, adjacent Turret #3 which was struck. The entry indicates that gas filled Turret #2 and that 35 men and the turret officer were killed, only five men escaping.

Savannah returned to Algiers on 10 August 1943 in order to train with U.S. Army troops for the Operation Avalanche amphibious landings to be made at Salerno, Italy. Leaving Mers-el-Kebir Harbor, Algeria, on 5 September, her Southern Attack Force entered Salerno Bay a few hours before midnight of the 8th. Savannah was the first American ship to open fire against the German shore defenses in Salerno Bay. She silenced a railroad artillery battery with 57 rounds, forced the retirement of enemy tanks, and completed eight more fire support missions that day. She continued her support until the morning of 11 September 1943, when she was put out of action. A radio-controlled Fritz X PGM gravity bomb had been released at a safe distance by a high-flying German warplane and it exploded 49 ft (15 m) distance from Philadelphia. Savannah increased her speed to 20 kn (23 mph, 37 km/h) as a KG 100 Dornier Do 217 K-2 bomber approached from out of the sun. USAAF P-38 Lightnings and Savannah's anti-aircraft gunners, tracking this warplane at 18,700 ft (5,700 m), failed to stop the Fritz X bomb, trailing a stream of smoke. The bomb pierced the armored turret roof of Savannah's No. 3 gun turret, passed through three decks into the lower ammunition-handling room, where it exploded, blowing a hole in her keel and tearing a seam in the cruiser's port side. For at least 30 minutes, secondary explosions in the turret and its ammunition supply rooms hampered firefighting efforts.

Savannah's crew quickly sealed off flooded and burned compartments, and corrected her list. With assistance from the salvage tugs Hopi and Moreno, Savannah got underway under her own steam by 17:57 and steamed for Malta. Savannah lost 206 crewmen in this attack. Thirteen other sailors were seriously wounded, and four more were trapped in a watertight compartment for 60 hours. These four sailors were not rescued until Savannah had already arrived at Grand Harbor, Valletta, Malta, on 12 September. After emergency repairs were completed, Savannah departed Malta on 7 December 1943, bound for the Philadelphia Naval Shipyard by way of Tunis, Algiers, and Bermuda. She arrived at the Naval Yard on 23 December and underwent heavy repair work for the next eight months. During this period her forward superstructure was remodeled, four dual mount 5"/38 caliber turrets replaced her eight single open-mount five-inch naval guns and a new set of up-to-date 20 mm and 40 mm antiaircraft guns were installed. In addition to the new gunnery fit she also received new air-search and surface-search gunnery radars. After this refit she more resembled her half sister St Louis, than her Brooklyn-class sister ships.

=== Later wartime activities ===
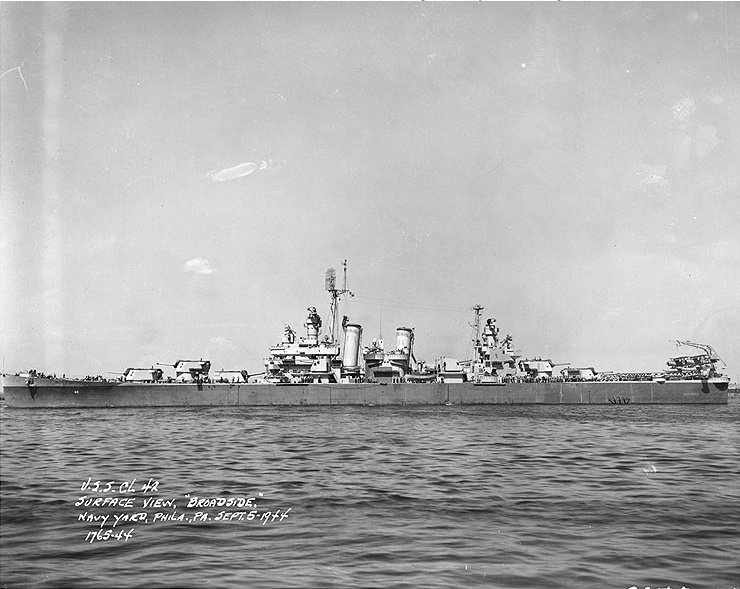
Savannah in Philadelphia on 5 September 1944, after repair and upgrades

Savannah's Navy Yard repairs of combat damage, and the upgrading of her weapons, were completed on 4 September 1944. Nonetheless, she was never sent to a combat zone for the remainder of the war. She steamed out of Philadelphia Harbor on the next day, and reported to the Commander, Fleet Operational Training Command on 10 September for a shakedown cruise and sailor's refresher training. She returned to Norfolk on 12 October 1944 for readiness training with CruDiv 8. Savannah sailed on 21 January 1945 to rendezvous with the heavy cruiser Quincy, which was carrying President Roosevelt to the Mediterranean Sea, en route to Yalta, Crimea, in the Soviet Union for a conference with Prime Minister Winston Churchill and the Soviet Premier Joseph Stalin.

Savannah entered Grand Harbor, Valletta, Malta, on 2 February 1945. At that island, the President and his party disembarked and traveled to Yalta by airplane. A memorial service was held at the graves of Savannah's sailors and marines killed in her bombing off Salerno. Savannah departed from Malta on 9 February 1945 and steamed to Alexandria, Egypt, to await the President's 12 February return to Quincy. The Presidential convoy departed Alexandria on 15 February and arrived at Hampton Roads, Virginia, on 27 February. Savannah was underway on 28 February 1945 and steamed towards a new homeport, Newport, Rhode Island, on 8 March. Until 24 May 1945, Savannah was used as a school ship for the nucleus of crews of warships that had not yet been commissioned.

== Post-war ==
After a visit to New York and installation of radar-guided fire control equipment for her 40 mm anti-aircraft guns, Savannah became the flagship of a midshipmen's training squadron under Rear Admiral Frank E. Beatty. Savannah departed from Annapolis on 7 June 1945 for training at sea with over 400 midshipmen aboard. After two such cruises to Cuba and back, Savannah disembarked the midshipmen at Annapolis on 30 September, took on others, and steamed on 1 October towards Pensacola, Florida. She spent the Navy Day celebrations from 25 to 30 October 1945 in her namesake city of Savannah. She then returned to Norfolk on 1 November to prepare for service in the huge Operation Magic Carpet naval fleet which was returning hundreds of thousands of overseas war veterans home to the United States. Savannah departed from Norfolk on 13 November 1945, and she reached Le Havre, France, on 20 November. The following day, she put to sea with 1,370 enlisted men and 67 officer passengers, bringing them to New York Harbor on 28 November. She completed another similar voyage on 17 December. Savannah's home base was shifted to the Philadelphia Naval Shipyard on 19 December 1945 for her deactivation overhaul. She was placed in commission in reserve on 22 April 1946, and was finally decommissioned on 3 February 1947. One of two Brooklyn-class cruisers modernized with bulges, twin 5in/38 guns and Mark 37 directors, she was retained by the USN when most of her surviving sister ships were sold to South American navies. Her name was struck from the Naval Vessel Register on 1 March 1959, and she was sold for scrapping on 6 January 1960 to the Bethlehem Steel Company.

== In literature and popular culture ==
The Battle of Sicily: How the Allies Lost Their Chance for Total Victory (Mitcham & von Stauffenberg; 1991) described Savannah in the 11 July 1943 Amphibious Battle of Gela, Sicily, as having fired 500 rounds from its fifteen six-inch guns onto the Italian Livorno Division, and was said to have broken the back of the Italian attack against U.S. Army Rangers who then took 400 Italian prisoners; Rangers Lead the Way (Taylor, 1996) characterized Savannah as "the Rangers' favorite cruiser" for this action. Taylor also credited Savannah with firing on German forces from twelve miles away to enable U.S. forces to seize the first high ground overlooking Gela.

In the 1980 movie "The Big Red One," Lee Marvin's character Sergeant Possum praised Savannah for firing on enemy tanks, infantry and artillery from miles offshore, as the Hermann Göring Panzer division approached Possum's position in a cave with their backs to the sea, Possum exclaiming that "the U.S. Navy saved our ass."

== Memorial and tributes ==
In Savannah, the Propeller Club of the United States has a memorial fountain to five ships named Savannah. The rightmost plaque on the fountain's north wall is for Savannah (CL-42).

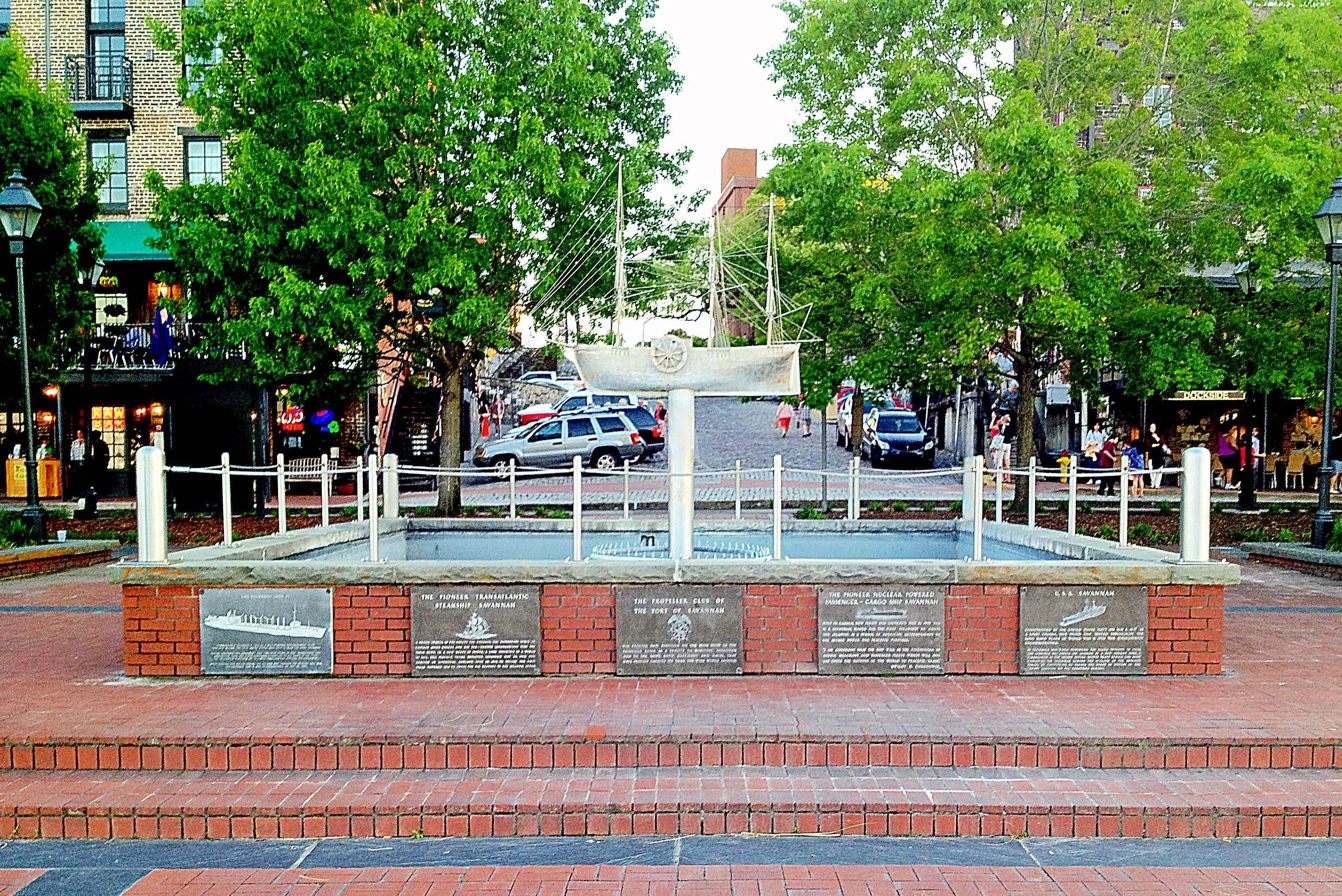
The memorial fountain on West River Street at Barnard St. in Savannah

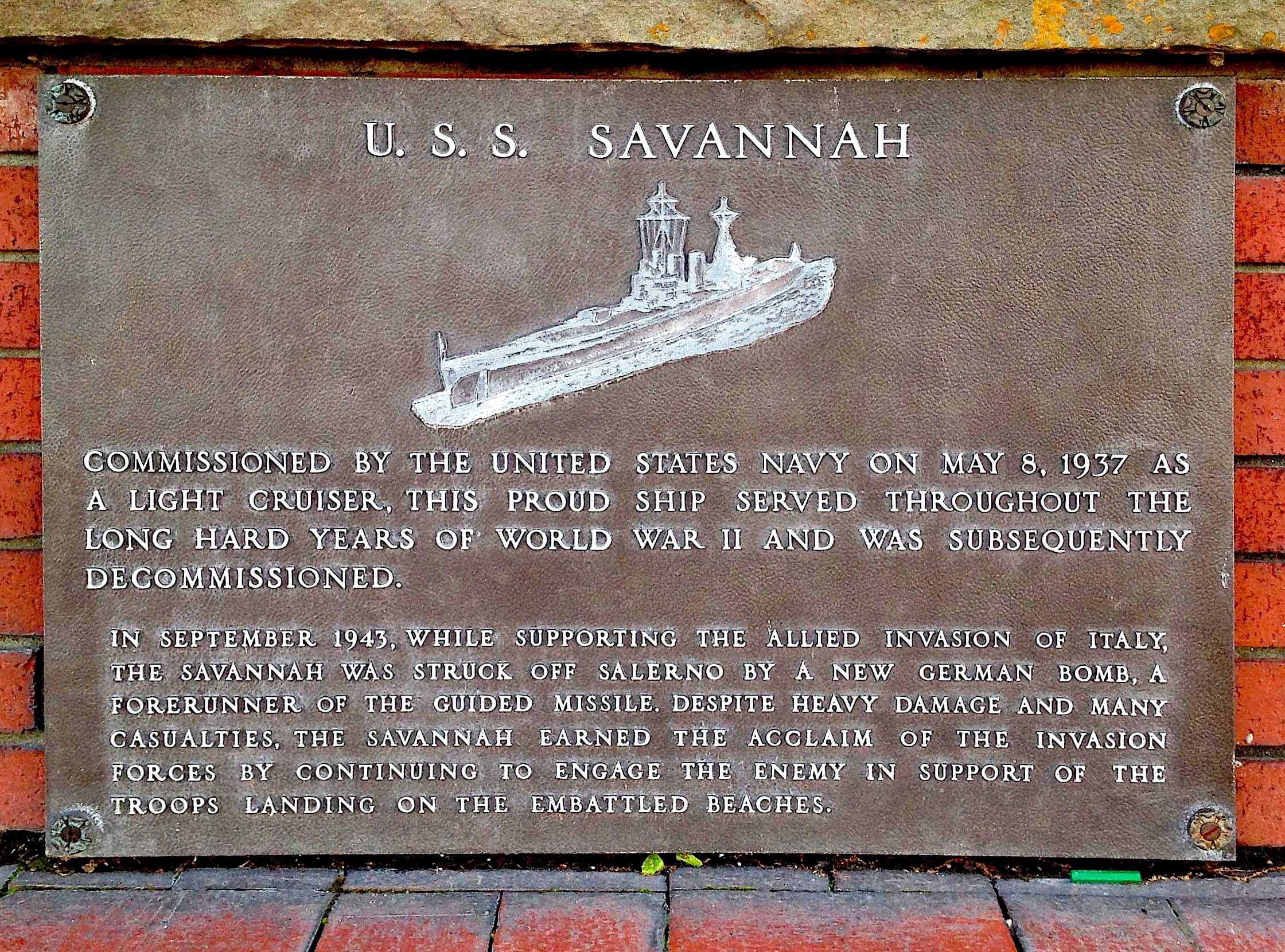
Enlargement: The plaque for USS Savannah (CL-42).

In late 2013 the Ships of the Sea Maritime Museum in Savannah, presented an exhibit to commemorate the seventieth anniversary of Savannah's participation in the Salerno landing. The museum subsequently maintained an online tribute, Battle Voices – Salerno, Italy 1943, that included photographs, a newsreel, the ship's Muster Roll, and quotations from crew members, war correspondents, and Savannah's General Quarters Narrative. The Savannah Morning News reported in 2013 that Savannah had its 35th and possibly final reunion in 2006, a gathering attended by about two dozen crewmen.

In late 2018, on the 75th anniversary of the Salerno landing, the Ships of the Sea Maritime Museum in Savannah provided a commemoration display titled "An Irregular Morning", including newsreel cuts and surviving artifacts.

Museum display of the builder's model shows an early embodiment of Savannah, lacking guns later added as World War II loomed.
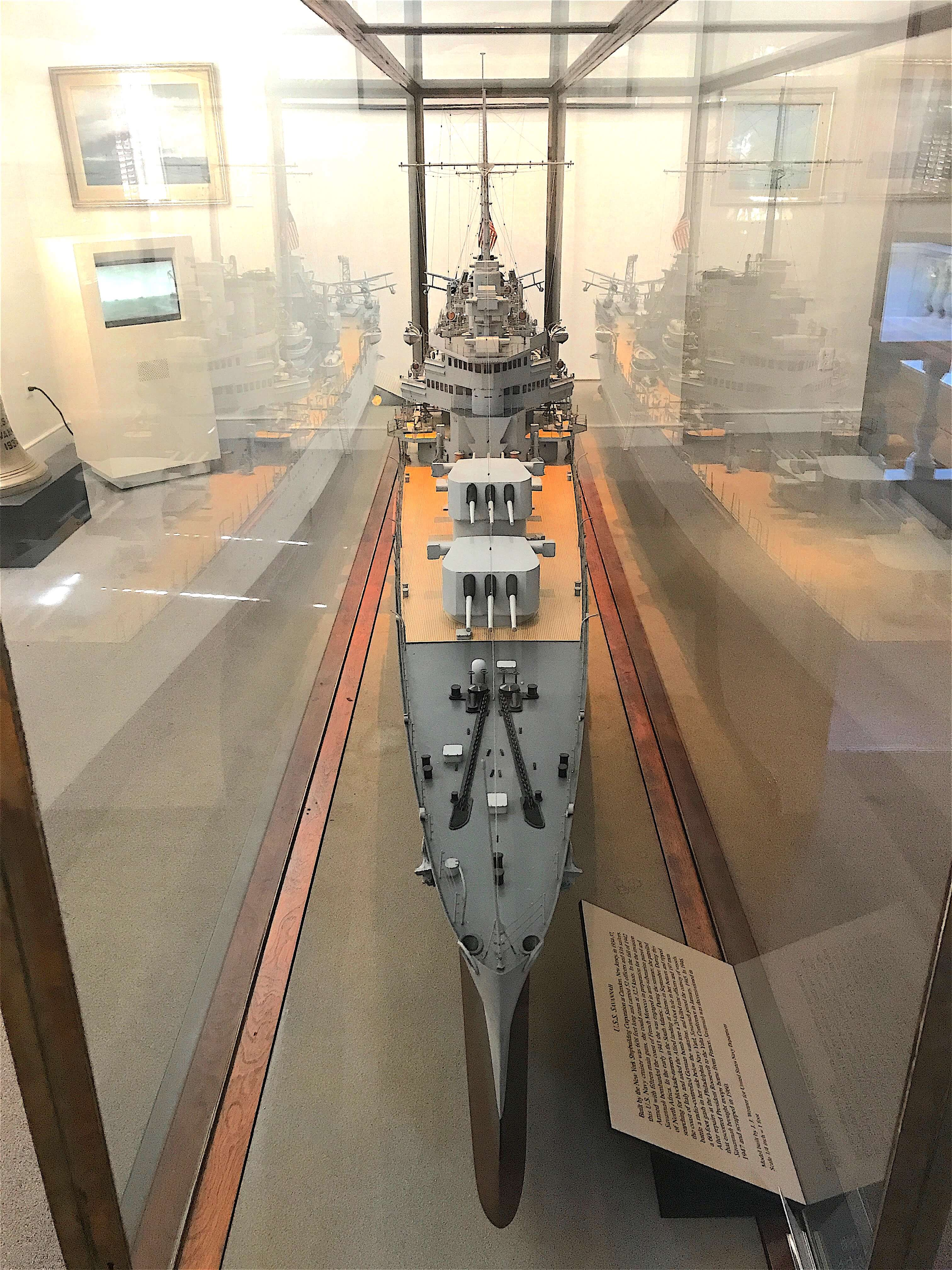
View from bow

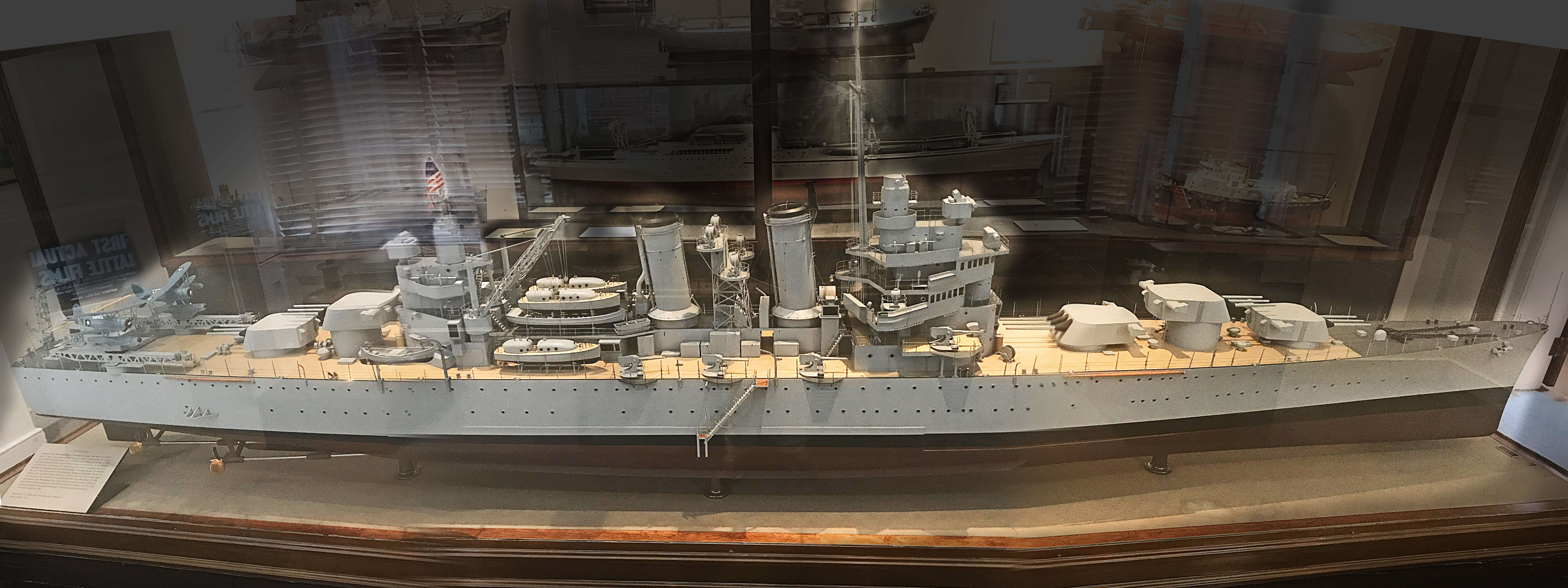
From starboard

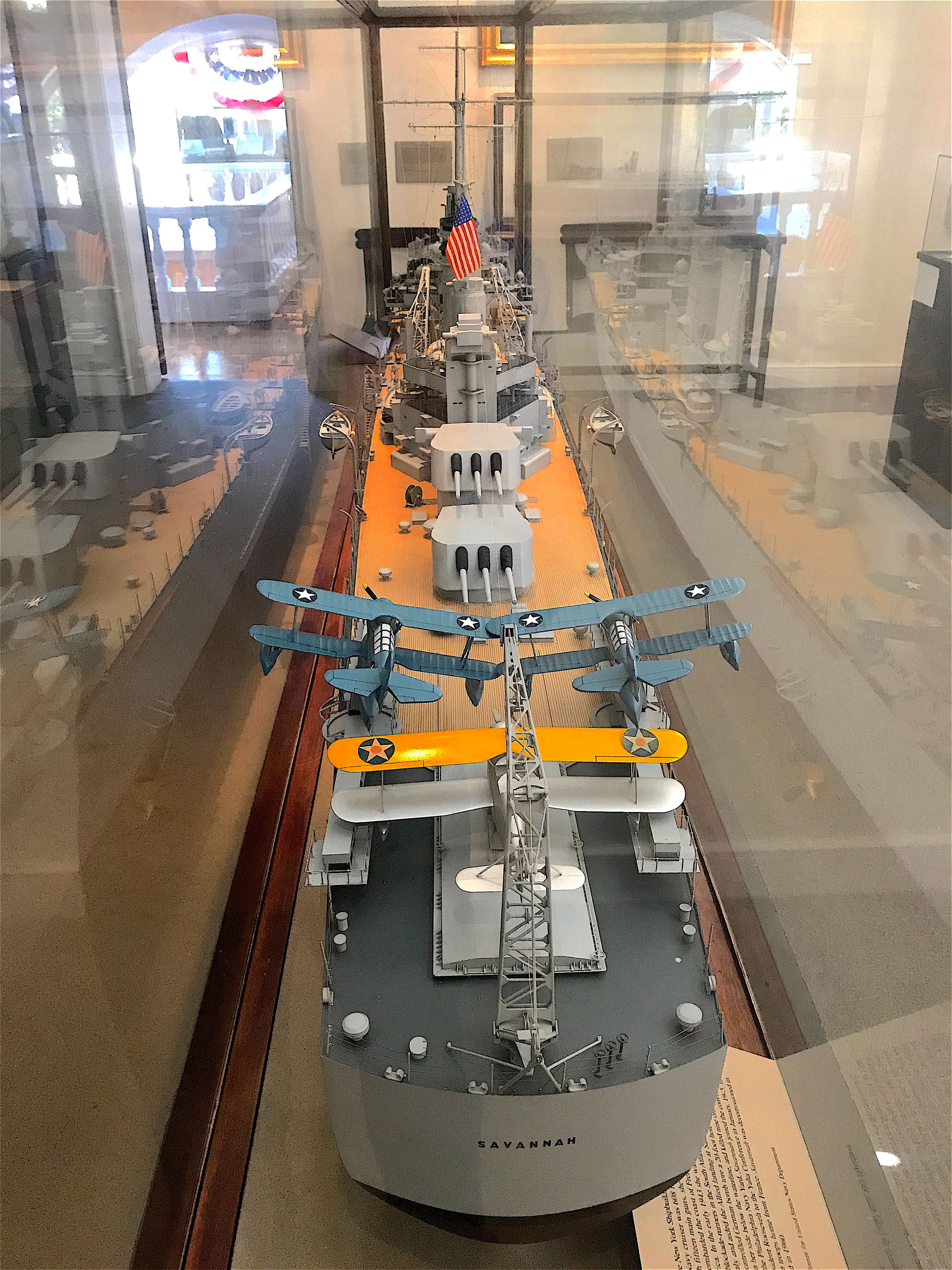
View from stern

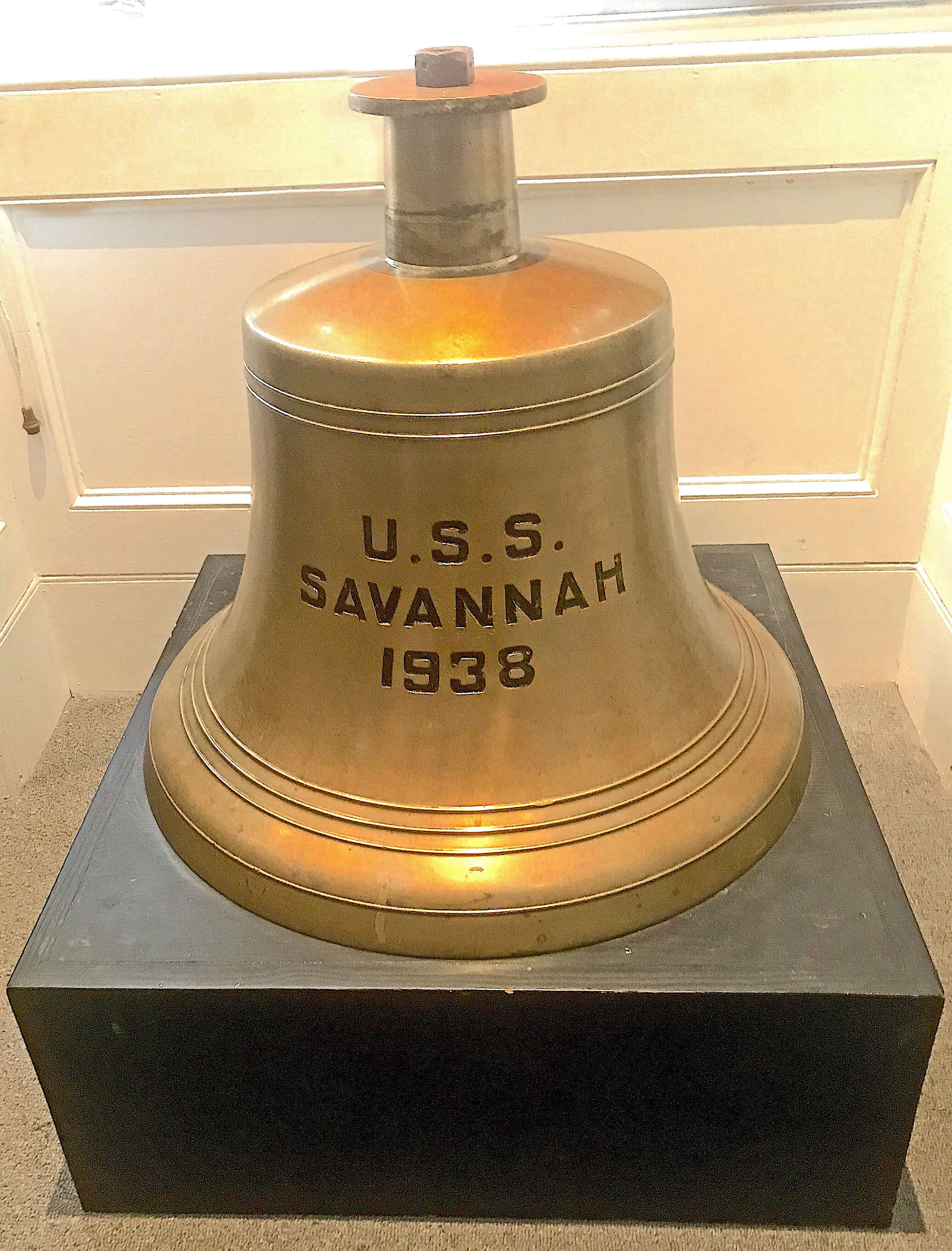
Ship's bell

== Awards ==
- European–African–Middle Eastern Campaign Medal with three battle stars for World War II service.

== See also ==
- Battle of Port Lyautey, Morocco, part of Operation Torch (initially called Operation Gymnast), November 1942
- North African Campaign
- Allied invasion of Sicily (Operation Husky), July–August 1943
- Allied invasion of Italy (included Operation Avalanche at Salerno), September 1943
