= Romancoke =

Romancoke is the name of either of two places on the mid-Atlantic seaboard of the United States:

- Romancoke, Maryland - an unincorporated community
- Romancoke, Virginia - an unincorporated community
