= Robert Webster Cary =

US Navy admiral and Medal of Honor recipient (1890–1967)

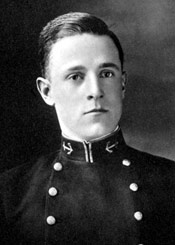
- Born: August 18, 1890; Kansas City, Missouri, U.S.
- Died: July 15, 1967 (aged 76); Toledo, Ohio, U.S.
- Burial place: Arlington National Cemetery
- Military career
- Allegiance: United States
- Branch: United States Navy
- Service years: 1914 – 1946
- Rank: Rear admiral
- Unit: USS San Diego
- Conflicts: World War I World War II
- Awards: Medal of Honor; Navy Cross; Legion of Merit (5); Distinguished Service Order (UK)

Rear Admiral Robert Webster Cary Jr. (August 18, 1890 – July 15, 1967) is one of the most decorated officers in the history of the United States Navy and recipient of the Medal of Honor.

== Education ==
Robert Cary was born in Kansas City, Missouri. He entered the University of Missouri in the fall of 1908 but left after the first semester of the following year and entered the United States Naval Academy where he graduated in 1914.

== Military career ==
Scarcely a year after graduating the Naval Academy he received the Medal of Honor for action in a boiler explosion on board USS San Diego. He was standing by the first of five boilers that blew up and saved the lives of three men by dragging them out of the boiler room. He also took charge of the situation in the adjacent boiler room, putting out the fires and thus preventing the explosion of these boilers.

During World War I, Cary served on the destroyers based at Queenstown, Ireland. During World War I Cary was awarded the Navy Cross. During a hurricane, a depth charge on the fan-tail of USS Sampson broke loose, menacing the safety of the ship. Together, with three enlisted men, he went to the fan-tail, and they managed to secure this depth charge, including its safety pin, at a great risk of being washed overboard themselves.

During the years between World War I and World War II, Cary served in many capacities and many stations. He served as the Director of Base Maintenance and in the Office of Chief of Naval Operations where he initiated the establishment of bases at home and abroad at the commencement of World War II. Cary also served with great distinction in World War II when he took part in various campaigns in the European Theater of Operations. On September 11, 1943, Cary was involved in another dramatic naval action when the ship he was commanding, the USS Savannah, was struck by a German radio-controlled Fritz X glide-bomb. By the time Cary retired in 1946 he had achieved the rank of Rear Admiral.

Upon his death in 1967 he was buried at Arlington National Cemetery, in Arlington, Virginia.

== Medal of Honor citation ==
Cary, Robert
Rank and organization: Lieutenant Commander, United States Navy, U.S.S. San Diego
Place and date: Aboard U.S.S. San Diego, 21 January 1915
Entered service at: Bunceton, Missouri
Born: Kansas City, Missouri
Citation:

For extraordinary heroism in the line of his profession on the occasion of an explosion on board the U.S.S. San Diego, 21 January 1915. Lt. Comdr. Cary (then Ensign), United States Navy, an observer on duty in the firerooms of the U.S.S. San Diego, commenced to take the half-hourly readings of the steam pressure at every boiler. He had read the steam and air pressure on No. 2 boiler and was just stepping through the electric watertight door into No. 1 fireroom when the boilers in No. 2 fireroom exploded. Ens. Cary stopped and held open the doors which were being closed electrically from the bridge, and yelled to the men in No. 2 fireroom to escape through these doors, which 3 of them did. Ens. Cary's action undoubtedly saved the lives of these men. He held the doors probably a minute with the escaping steam from the ruptured boilers around him. His example of coolness did much to keep the men in No. 1 fireroom at their posts hauling fires, although 5 boilers in their immediate vicinity had exploded and boilers Nos. 1 and 3 apparently had no water in them and were likely to explode any instant. When these fires were hauled under Nos. 1 and 3 boilers, Ens. Cary directed the men in this fireroom into the bunker, for they well knew the danger of these 2 boilers exploding. During the entire time Ens. Cary was cool and collected and showed an abundance of nerve under the most trying circumstances. His action on this occasion was above and beyond the call of duty.

== Decorations ==
Medal of Honor
Navy Cross
Legion of Merit with four Gold Stars
World War I Victory Medal
American Defense Service Medal
American Campaign Medal
European-African-Middle Eastern Campaign Medal with 3 service stars
World War II Victory Medal
Distinguished Service Order (United Kingdom)

== See also ==
- List of Medal of Honor recipients in non-combat incidents
