= Hodgman =

Hodgman or Hodgeman is a surname. Notable people with the surname include:

- Bill Hodgman, Australian politician
- Helen Hodgman, Australian novelist
- John Hodgman, American humorist
- Kym Hodgeman, Australian footballer
- Michael Hodgman, Australian politician
- Peter Hodgman, Australian politician
- Roger Hodgman, Australian director
- William A. Hodgman, Governor of Guam
- William Hodgman, lawyer and prosecutor, known for his work in the O. J. Simpson murder case
- William Edward Felix Hodgman, Australian politician

== See also ==
- Hodgeman County, Kansas
