= 1865 Upper Peninsula miners' strike =

Upper Peninsula miners' strike
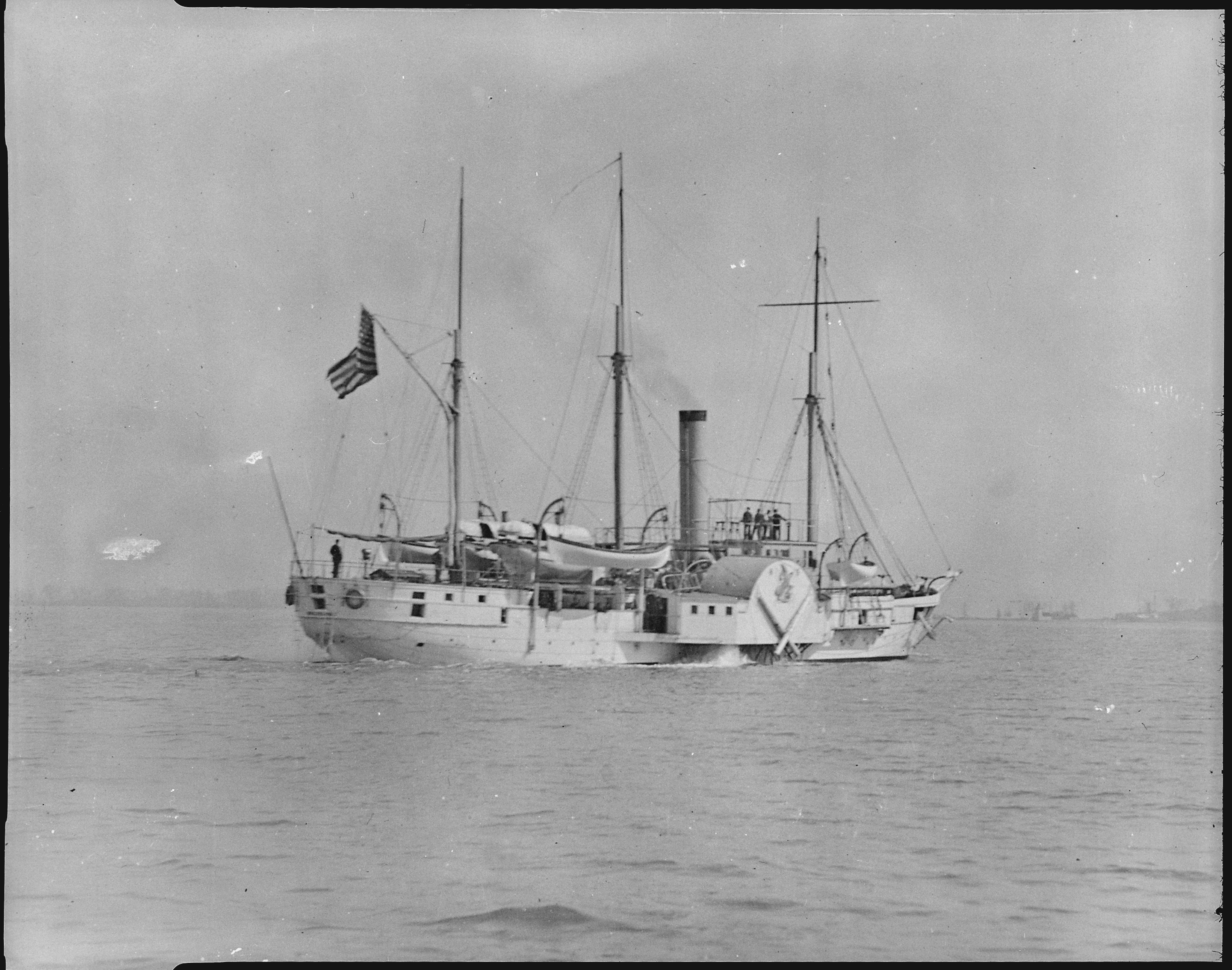
- Sailors from Michigan, seen here at an unknown date, helped put down the 1865 miner's strike.
- Date: July 1865
- Location: Marquette, Michigan
- Goals: Higher wages
- Methods: Strikes, looting

Ore miners working on the Marquette Iron Range (located in the United States' Upper Peninsula of Michigan) went on strike in July 1865, shortly after the end of the American Civil War. They were put down by a naval detachment from the USS Michigan, using an improvised armored train, and later with an army detachment from Chicago.

== Prelude: 1864 ==
During the United States' Civil War, high demand meant the price of iron had significantly increased. Knowing this, the miners forced the mining companies to raise their wages in 1864. The problem was not solved, as the dockworkers, who were paid significantly less than the miners, struck for higher wages. Cleveland Iron Mining Company officials near the capital requested troops from Michigan's governor, believing that the war's demand for iron would override social concerns for the workers. They were correct; a United States Navy gunboat, Michigan, and a troop contingent were sent to the area. Their arrival was instrumental in quashing the strike.

== Strike: 1865 ==
The wartime demand quickly abated after the war's end in April 1865, and the many returning soldiers increased the labor pool. When combined, this meant that Cleveland and other nearby companies felt justified in announcing a wage cut on Saturday, July 1, 1865. The miners grudgingly accepted the cuts, but the dockworkers refused their wage cut and the companies gave into their demands. This galvanized the miners, and 1500 to 2000 of them marched on the mines and the town of Marquette, looting, burning, and destroying equipment they came across. Two days later, Michigan and its crew arrived in Marquette's harbor as part of a routine sweep of Lake Superior for Confederate activity. (Note: This fear of Confederate terrorism was not entirely farfetched even though the war had ended in April. Confederate agents captured and destroyed two Great Lakes steamers in 1864, and resistance against the United States only ended in late June with the capture of the commerce raider Shenandoah. Though we know now that Shenandoah had only continued operations because her crew had no firm indication of the war’s end, and clandestine agents in the North would have had news to halt operations, given the context, Northern fears of continued Confederate attacks in the 1865 were justifiable.)

The captain of Michigan, Lieutenant Commander Francis A. Roe, had fought through the war in various capacities, including directing a fight between his Sassacus and a Confederate ram, Albemarle. On appraising the situation, he quickly moved to end the strike. He mounted two of the ship’s guns on a railroad car, fitted it with metal to act as armor, and enlisted a steam engine to push it with a full landing party. All were armed and most were veterans of the war, as opposed to the miners, who had little to no combat experience. He recounted the incident months later:

They were told that twenty-four hours, and no more, would be allowed them, and if by that time they were not at work, and the ore loaded in the idle cars, that encampment would be stormed by shot and shell, and no questions would be asked or answered. There must be no more rioting, no more idleness, and no more threats.

After Michigan's departure, the miners struck again and were put back down by a returning Michigan and the 8th Regiment of the Veteran Reserve Corps, brought up by rail from Chicago.
