= Chris Hogman =

Swedish artist

Christofer Högman
- Born: Christofer Högman; Stockholm, Sweden
- Occupation: Artist

Chris Hogman (born Christofer Högman) is a Swedish artist known for his oil paintings and innovative use of color. He is particularly recognized for his ability to evoke emotions and narratives through his artwork.

== Early life and career ==
Högman developed an interest in art early on. He attended the Gerlesborg School of Fine Art in Stockholm. During his time there, he built a significant following on Instagram, showcasing his works and gaining international recognition. This early success helped establish his career as a professional artist.

== Artistic Style ==
Hogman's artistic style is marked by his use of oil paint and vibrant colors to convey emotions and narratives. His works are known for their transformative quality, inviting viewers to continually discover new layers and meanings.
