= USS Moreno =

Tugboat of the United States Navy

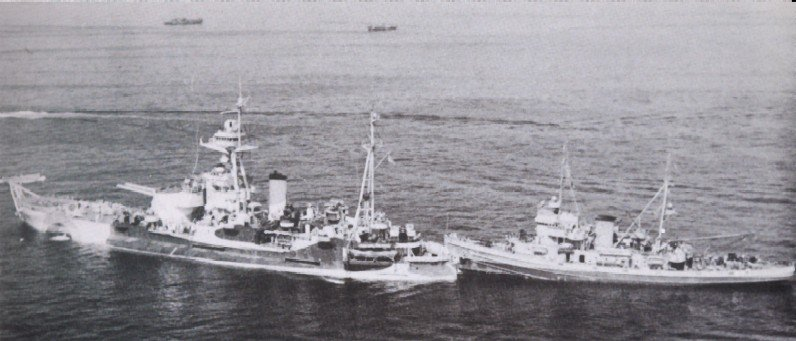
- USS Moreno (AT-87) (right) rendering assistance to HMS Abercrombie, 10 September 1943, in the Gulf of Salerno.

History

United States
- Name: USS Moreno
- Builder: Cramp Shipbuilding Co., Philadelphia
- Yard number: 542
- Laid down: 26 June 1942
- Launched: 9 July 1942
- Commissioned: 30 November 1942
- Decommissioned: 18 August 1946
- Reclassified: ATF-87, 15 May 1944
- Stricken: 1 September 1961
- Honors and awards: 3 battle stars (World War II)
- Fate: Disposed of in support of Fleet training exercise; 6 October 1988

General characteristics
- Class & type: Navajo-class fleet tug
- Displacement: 1,235 long tons (1,255 t)
- Length: 205 ft (62 m)
- Beam: 38 ft 6 in (11.73 m)
- Draft: 15 ft 4 in (4.67 m)
- Propulsion: Diesel-electric; four General Motors 12-278A diesel main engines driving four General Electric generators and three General Motors 3-268A auxiliary services engines; single screw; 3,600 shp (2,685 kW)
- Speed: 16 knots (30 km/h; 18 mph)
- Complement: 85
- Armament: 1 × 3 in (76 mm) gun; 2 × twin 40 mm gun mounts; 2 × single 20 mm guns

USS Moreno (AT-87) was a Navajo-class fleet tug constructed for the United States Navy during World War II. Her purpose was to aid ships, usually by towing, on the high seas or in combat or post-combat areas, plus "other duties as assigned." She served in the Atlantic Ocean and, at war's end, returned home with three battle stars to her credit.

Moreno was laid down as AT-87, on 26 June 1942, by William Cramp & Sons of Philadelphia; launched on 9 July 1942; sponsored by Mrs. Charles H. Kramb; and commissioned on 30 November 1942.

== World War II Atlantic Ocean operations ==
Following shakedown out of Norfolk, Virginia, Moreno, a fleet tug equipped with good firefighting, salvage, and repair facilities to allow participation in combat operations, sailed, on 21 January 1943, for Bermuda. There she provided towing and escort services to vessels attached to the naval operating base and assigned to convoys using the southern lanes across the North Atlantic to Africa and Europe. On 3 March, she rendezvoused with task force TF 32 and set out for Gibraltar, returning to Norfolk, Virginia, with TF 63 on 28 April. While at sea with those forces, Moreno was employed as an escort and as a standby tug.

== Supporting the invasion of Sicily ==
After availability at Norfolk, Moreno again headed out across the Atlantic, sailing on 8 June with TF 65. She anchored off Oran on the 22nd, and then continued on to Bizerte, where she prepared for the invasion of southern Sicily.

== Damaged by a near miss ==
On 6 July, while still at Bizerte, she was caught in an air raid during which a near miss injured three men and damaged the superstructure and rigging. By 8 July, however, she was underway in an LST convoy bound for Sicily. Despite heavy weather, Task Force 86, the Licata Attack Force, "Joss" arrived off Licata early on the 10th, and Task Force 86.5, the Falconara Attack Group headed toward "Beach Blue" while Moreno stood by to provide aid if called upon. Later in the day, the tug shifted to Licata, anchoring in the bay.

Through 10 August, she salvaged and repaired damaged vessels, fought fires, and cleared beachhead landing craft at Licata, Gela, Port Empedocle, Sciacca, and Marsala. On the 11th, she commenced planting buoys in swept channels at Marsala and off the western coast of the island. Detached on the 21st, she joined a merchant convoy and sailed to Tunis, where, her part in "Operation Husky" completed, she prepared for Operation Avalanche, the assault at Salerno.

== Supporting invasion of Italy operations ==
Sailing with TF 81 on 7 September, she was in the Gulf of Salerno, standing off the landing beaches at Paestum, by 0100 on the 9th. She remained in the area, conducting firefighting, salvage, repair, and fueling operations in spite of frequent air raids, until 4 November, when she departed for Bizerte. Thence, she followed the African coast to Algiers for availability and salvage work in that area.

On 11 February 1944, Moreno sailed back to Bizerte where she received towing assignments which took her to Taranto, Malta, and Naples. From 6 April through 27 July, Moreno, now ATF 87 (effective 15 May), was employed in convoy work from Naples and Palermo to Bizerte, shuttling damaged LCTs south, and those in good repair north. She then steamed to Algiers, and from there, to Corsica and various Italian ports before arriving at Palermo to prepare for "Operation Dragoon", the invasion of southern France.

== Invasion of southern France operations ==
Departing Palermo on 7 August, she proceeded first to Naples and then to Ajaccio, where, on the 13th, she joined convoy 89.1 and sailed for St. Raphael. On the 15th, she was off Green Beach providing services similar to those performed at Licata and Paestum. On the 18th, she shifted to the Gulf of St. Tropez, remaining there until 9 October.

From southern France, Moreno returned to Palermo for availability and then commenced towing and escort services between various points in Italy, Corsica, France, and north Africa. On 7 March 1945, she took Tackle (ARS-37) in tow and headed for Odessa, where the latter's cargo, food, clothing and medicine, was off loaded for distribution to American soldiers recently released from German POW camps by Red Army units.

== Returning stateside ==
Moreno, with Tackle, returned to Oran on 13 April, only to depart, again with Tackle in tow, three days later for the Azores. The two vessels were engaged in repair work until 6 May, when they joined convoy GUS 87 and steamed west. Arriving at Norfolk on 18 May, Moreno entered the Norfolk Navy Yard for a brief overhaul. On 5 July, she got underway for Charleston, South Carolina, where she took ARDC-11 and an Army tug in tow.

== Transfer to the Pacific Fleet ==
Leaving the Army vessel in Panama, Moreno continued up the west coast to San Diego, California, arriving on 9 September. She remained in operation with the U.S. Pacific Fleet until ordered back to the Atlantic at the end of the year.

== Post-war decommissioning ==
On 17 May 1946, Moreno reported to the U.S. 16th Fleet for inactivation, decommissioning on 13 August and berthing at Orange, Texas. The diesel electric, single screw tug remained in the Reserve Fleet until transferred to the Maritime Administration and moved to the Beaumont NDRF on 15 December 1960. Moreno was struck from the Naval Vessel Register on 1 September 1961. Moreno remained in the Beaumont NDRF until 15 December 1986 when she was returned to the Navy to be prepared for target use. Moreno was sunk on 6 October 1988 during a test of the Penguin Missile.

== Awards ==
Moreno received three battle stars for World War II service.
