= William A. Hodgman =

William Adams Hodgman (January 31, 1884 – February 9, 1967) was a United States Navy captain and diplomat. He served on a number of ships, and briefly as the 23rd Naval Governor of Guam. During World War I, he commanded USS Roe, for which he received the Navy Cross. After leaving the navy, he served as commercial attaché to several countries, notably to Hungary, where he gained notoriety for striking a duke at a party.

== Naval career ==
Hodgman graduated from the United States Naval Academy in 1908, after being appointed from New York. He served on a number of ships during his career. In 1913, as an ensign, he served aboard USS Nebraska. In 1917, Hodgman, then a lieutenant, served aboard USS Connecticut. Hodgman served as acting governor of Guam from November 22, 1919, to December 21, 1919. As a lieutenant commander, he received the Navy Cross for his exceptional command of USS Roe during World War I. He retired as a captain.

== Diplomatic work ==
After leaving the navy, Hodgman served as a commercial attaché to Guatemala. In 1931, he was acting as commercial attaché to Hungary when he became involved in a diplomatic incident. He had been hosting a party shortly before returning to the United States on leave. There, Heinrich Borwin, Duke of the House of Mecklenburg, made disparaging remarks about some of Hodgman's guests, prompting the diplomat to strike Borwin. Borwin consequently challenged Hodgman to a duel, but Hodgman declined and returned to the United States shortly thereafter. Despite this incident, Hodgman kept his post as diplomat, and was assigned to Montevideo, Uruguay, later the same year.

He died on February 9, 1967, in San Diego, California.
