= List of United States Army campaigns during World War II =

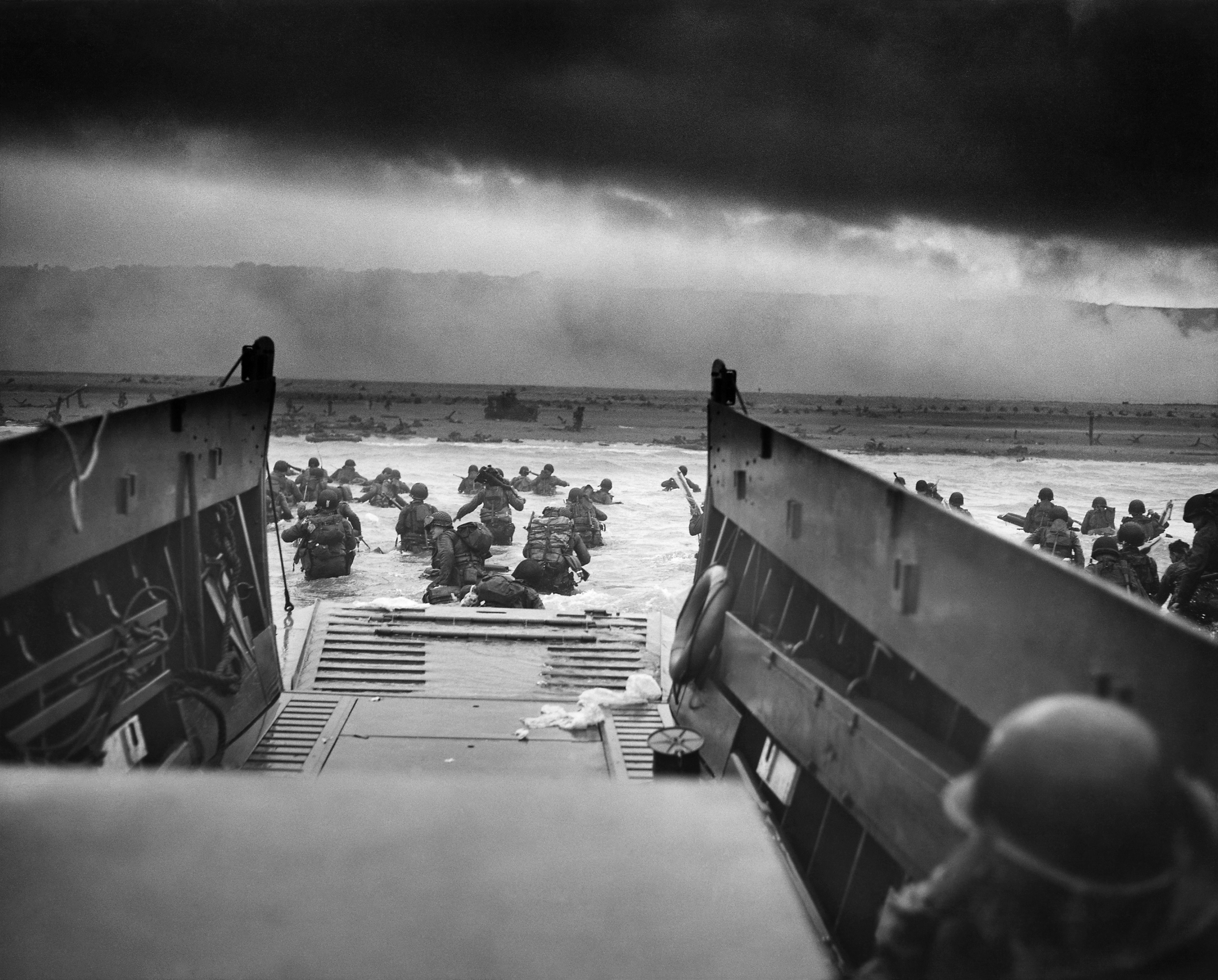
D-Day in Normandy: U.S. troops wading through water and German gunfire. The picture is titled Into the Jaws of Death. Taken on 6 June 1944.

The United States Army conducted many campaigns during World War II. These are the campaigns that were officially designated by the Army. It is the basis of campaign honors and awards for U.S. Army units and servicemen, but is not a comprehensive list of all the campaigns of the war, as it omits campaigns in which U.S. Army participation was minimal.

In all, 44 World War II campaigns were designated by the U.S. Army: 24 for the Asiatic–Pacific Theater, 19 in the European–African–Middle Eastern Theater, and one in the American Theater. In addition, there were three main blanket campaigns: antisubmarine warfare, ground combat and air combat. These were designated for each theater, except the American Theater, which only had the one blanket campaign awarded – anti-submarine warfare. These three theaters each had its own campaign ribbon. The list of campaigns includes those undertaken by U.S. Army units participating in ground combat as well as those undertaken by United States Army Air Forces participating in air combat.

== Overview ==
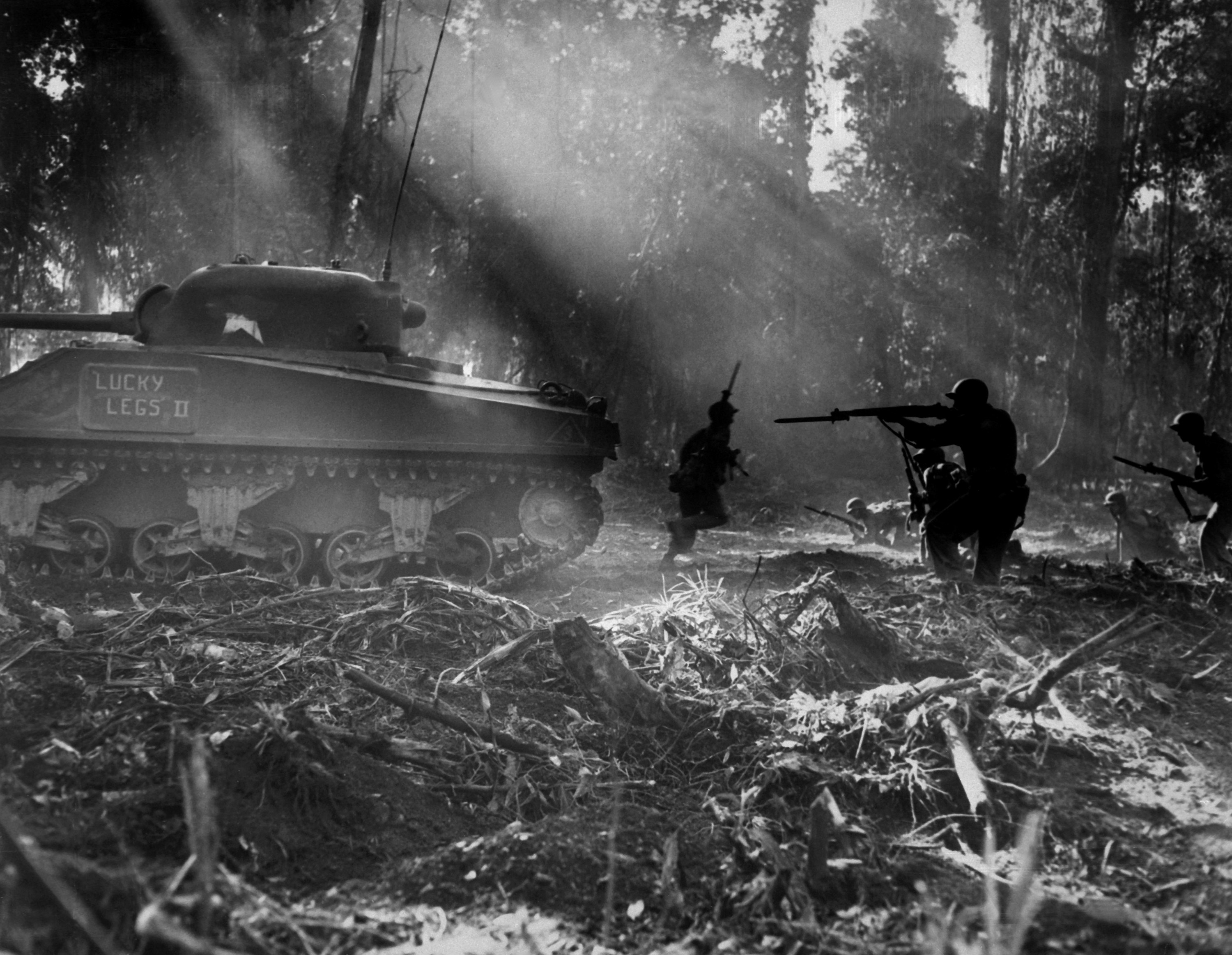
U.S. Army soldiers on Bougainville taking cover behind an M4 Sherman tank. Taken on 29 February 1943.

The war started for America on 7 December 1941 with the Japanese attack on Pearl Harbor, and the invasion of the Philippines and the Dutch East Indies. Hard-fought campaigns in Papua and Guadalcanal followed in 1942. In 1943, the Japanese were driven from the Aleutian Islands, and U.S. forces landed in the northern Solomon Islands, the Gilbert Islands, and the Bismarck Archipelago. This was followed in 1944 by the invasion of the Marshall Islands, a series of landings in western New Guinea, the capture of the Mariana Islands and Battle of Palau. The U.S. Army returned to the Philippines in October 1944, waging major campaigns on Luzon and the southern Philippines through 1945. U.S. forces landed on Okinawa and in April 1945. Atomic bombs developed under the direction of the U.S. Army were dropped on Hiroshima and Nagasaki in 1945, which caused the Japanese to unconditionally surrender on 2 September 1945, aboard the USS Missouri.

While U.S. support for China was a reason for the war, the U.S. Army did not deploy major ground forces there, although U.S. air and service units played a vital role. After being driven out of Burma in 1942, a provisional regiment of the U.S. Army (Merrill's Marauders) participated in the reconquest of Northern Burma in 1944, and two regiments took part in the Central Burma Campaign the following year before moving on into China. In response to U.S. Army Air Forces operations from China, the Japanese drove the Americans and Chinese from eastern China. Only in the last weeks of the war did the tide turn in favor of the Allies in China.

Although many campaigns were fought in Asia and the Pacific, the major focus of the U.S. Army was always on the European Theater, where most its strength was ultimately deployed. U.S. forces saw action in the invasion of North Africa in November 1942, and the subsequent Tunisia Campaign in 1943. The U.S. Army participated in the Allied invasion of Sicily in July 1943, and then the Allied invasion of Italy in September. Hopes for a quick capture of Rome were frustrated by the Germans, who conducted a fighting withdrawal to the Gustav Line, which the landing at Anzio and the fighting at Monte Cassino in January 1944 failed to break. The Gustav Line was finally broken in May 1944, while Rome was captured on 4 June, and the Germans retreated to the Gothic Line in Northern Italy, where the Allies were held until they broke into the Po Valley in a successful offensive in April 1945.

In June 1944, the U.S. Army participated in Operation Overlord, the Allied invasion of Normandy. After heavy fighting, the Allies broke out of Normandy in July 1944. Efforts to capture the ports in Brittany proved difficult, but Allied forces quickly liberated Belgium and much of France. U.S. forces participated in the invasion of southern France (Operation Dragoon) in August 1944, and the airborne assault on the Netherlands (Operation Market Garden) in September, but logistical difficulties and German resistance slowed U.S. assaults on the Siegfried Line and in Lorraine in late 1944. In December 1944, the U.S. Army was surprised by the German Ardennes offensive (the Battle of the Bulge), which was defeated only after costly fighting that strained the U.S. Army's manpower to its limits. In February 1945, operations began that drove the Germans from the Rhineland, and the Rhine was crossed in March 1945. In April 1945, U.S. Army forces entered the heartland of Germany. Operations continued until the war in Europe ended on 8 May 1945 with the signing of unconditional surrender the previous day.

== Asiatic–Pacific Theater ==
The Asiatic–Pacific Campaign streamer

=== Pacific campaigns ===
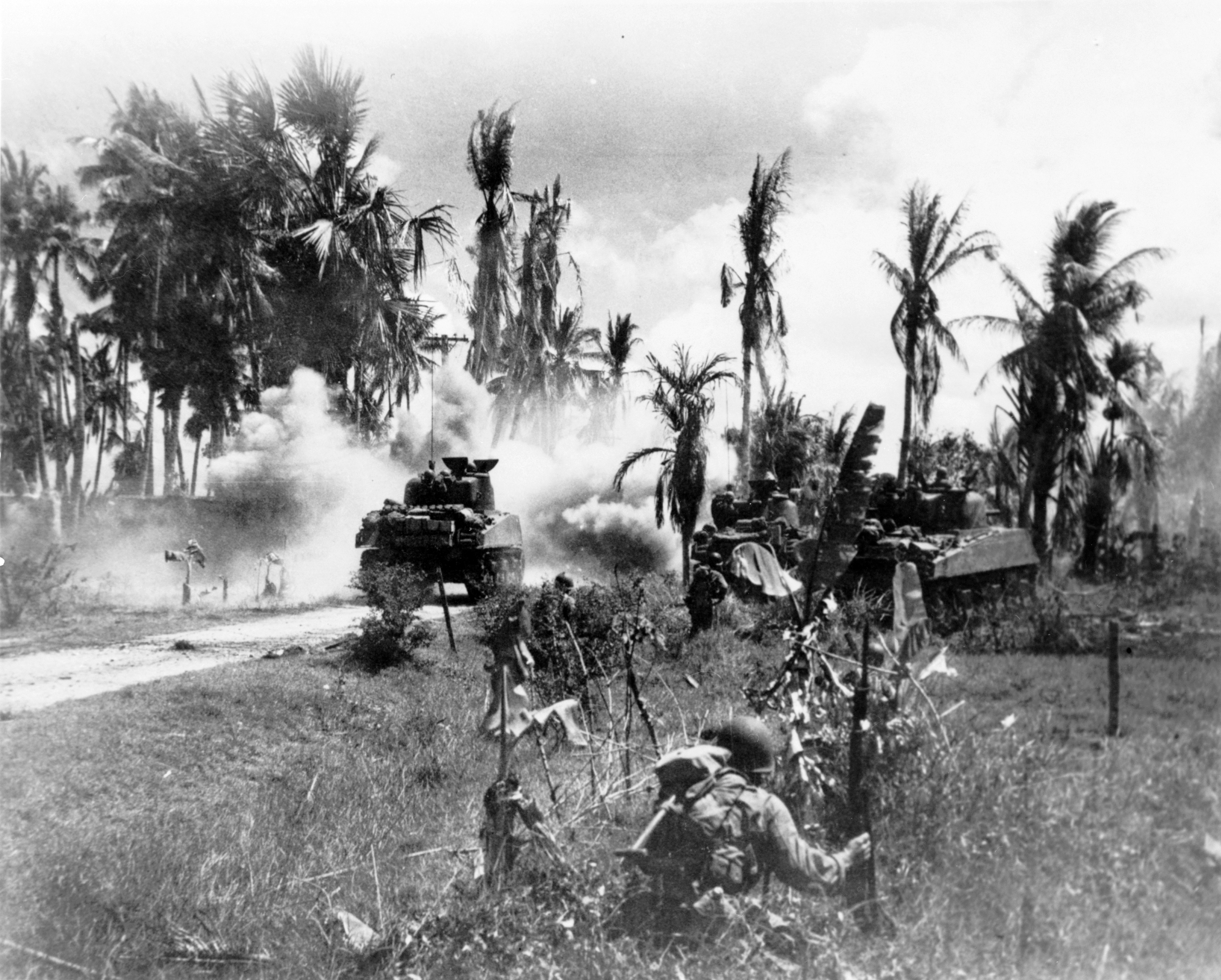
Troops of the 185th Infantry, 40th Infantry Division, take cover behind advancing tanks while moving up on Japanese positions on Panay Island. Taken on 13 March 1945.

Campaign name	Date	Result
Pacific Air Offensive	17 April 1942 – 2 September 1945	
Philippine Islands Campaign	7 December 1941 – 10 May 1942	Japanese victory, American retreat from the Philippines
East Indies Campaign	1 January – 22 July 1942	Japanese victory, Allied retreat from the East Indies.
Aleutian Islands Campaign (Note: The Aleutian Islands Campaign is considered part of both the Pacific and American theaters since it is physically part of North America, but geographically juts out into the Pacific Ocean. Participation is recognized with a Campaign Star on the Asiatic–Pacific Campaign Medal rather than on the American Campaign Medal.)	3 June 1942 – 24 August 1943	Allied victory, Japanese withdraw from the Aleutian Islands.
Guadalcanal Campaign	7 August 1942 – 21 February 1943	U.S. victory, Japanese withdraw from Guadalcanal.
Northern Solomons Campaign	22 February 1943 – 21 November 1944	Allied victory, Japanese resistance remains.
Bismarck Archipelago Campaign	15 December 1943 – 27 November 1944	Allied victory, Japanese resistance remains.
Papua Campaign	23 July 1942 – 23 January 1943	Allied victory, Japanese withdraw from Papua.
New Guinea Campaign	24 January 1943 – 31 December 1944	Allied victory, Japanese resistance remains.
Leyte Campaign	17 October 1944 – 1 July 1945	Allied victory, Japanese withdraw, sporadic resistance remains.
Luzon Campaign	15 December 1944 – 4 July 1945	Allied victory, Japanese resistance remains.
Southern Philippines Campaign	27 February – 4 July 1945	Allied victory, Japanese resistance remains.
Central Pacific Campaign	7 December 1941 – 6 December 1944	U.S. victory, Japanese resistance remains.
Eastern Mandates Campaign	31 January – 14 June 1944	U.S. victory, Japanese resistance remains.
Western Pacific Campaign	15 June 1944 – 2 September 1945	U.S. victory, Japanese resistance remains.
Ryukyus Campaign	26 March – 2 July 1945	U.S. victory, Japanese sporadic resistance remains.

=== Campaigns in the China India Burma Theater ===
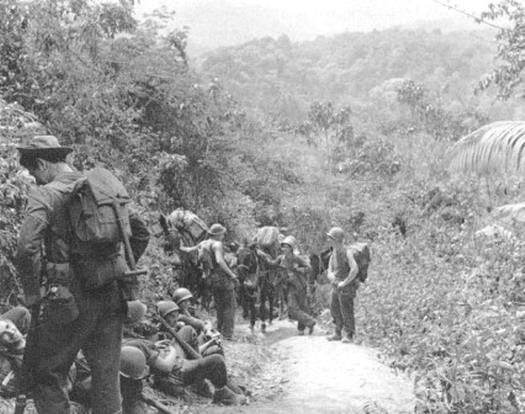
Merrill's Marauders rest during a break along a jungle trail near Nhpum Ga in Burma. Taken in 1943–1944,

Campaign name	Date	Result
Burma, 1942	7 December 1941 – 26 May 1942	Japanese victory, Allied retreat into India.
India–Burma Campaign	2 April 1942 – 28 January 1945	Allied victory, Japanese retreat into Central Burma.
Central Burma Campaign	29 January – 15 July 1945	Allied victory, Japanese are driven out of Burma
China Defensive Campaign	4 July 1942 – 4 May 1945	Japanese victory, Allies driven from eastern China
China Offensive Campaign	5 May – 2 September 1945	Allied victory when war ends.

=== Blanket campaigns ===
Campaign name	Date	Result
Anti-submarine campaign	7 December 1941 – 2 September 1945	
Ground Combat	7 December 1941 – 2 September 1945	
Air Combat	7 December 1941 – 2 September 1945	

== European–African–Middle East Theater ==
The European–African–Middle Eastern campaign streamer

=== North African / Mediterranean Theater campaigns ===
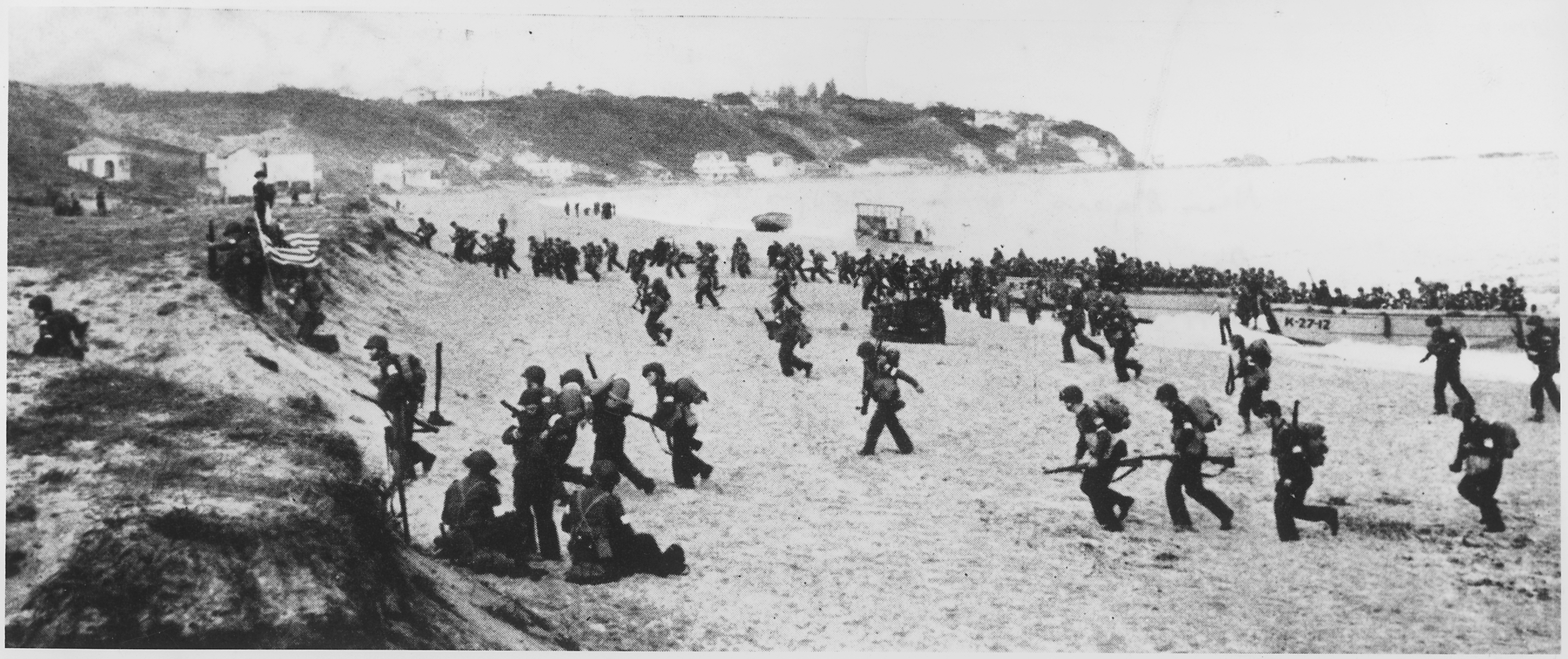
American troops hit the beaches, near Algiers, behind a large American flag, hoping for Vichy French troops not to fire. The French did not fire at the American forces on the beaches. Taken on 8 November 1942.

Campaign name	Date	Result
Egypt–Libya Campaign	11 June 1942 – 12 February 1943	Allied victory, Axis withdraw into Tunisia.
Algeria–French Morocco Campaign	8 November 1942 – 11 November 1942	Allied victory over Vichy French.
Tunisia Campaign	17 November 1942 – 13 May 1943	Allied victory, Axis withdraw to Italy.
Sicily Campaign	9 July – 17 August 1943	Allied victory, Germans retreat into Italy.
Naples–Foggia Campaign	9 September 1943 – 21 January 1944	Stalemate; Germans conduct a fighting withdrawal to the Gustav Line.
Anzio Campaign	22 January – 24 May 1944	Stalemate at first; Allies fail to capture Rome, Germans fail to destroy Allied beachhead. The Allies broke out from the beachhead several months later.
Rome–Arno Campaign	22 January – 9 September 1944	Allied victory, Germans withdraw to the Gothic Line.
North Apennines Campaign	10 September 1944 – 4 April 1945	Stalemate.
Po Valley Campaign	5 April – 8 May 1945	Allied victory, Germans surrender in Italy.

=== European campaigns ===
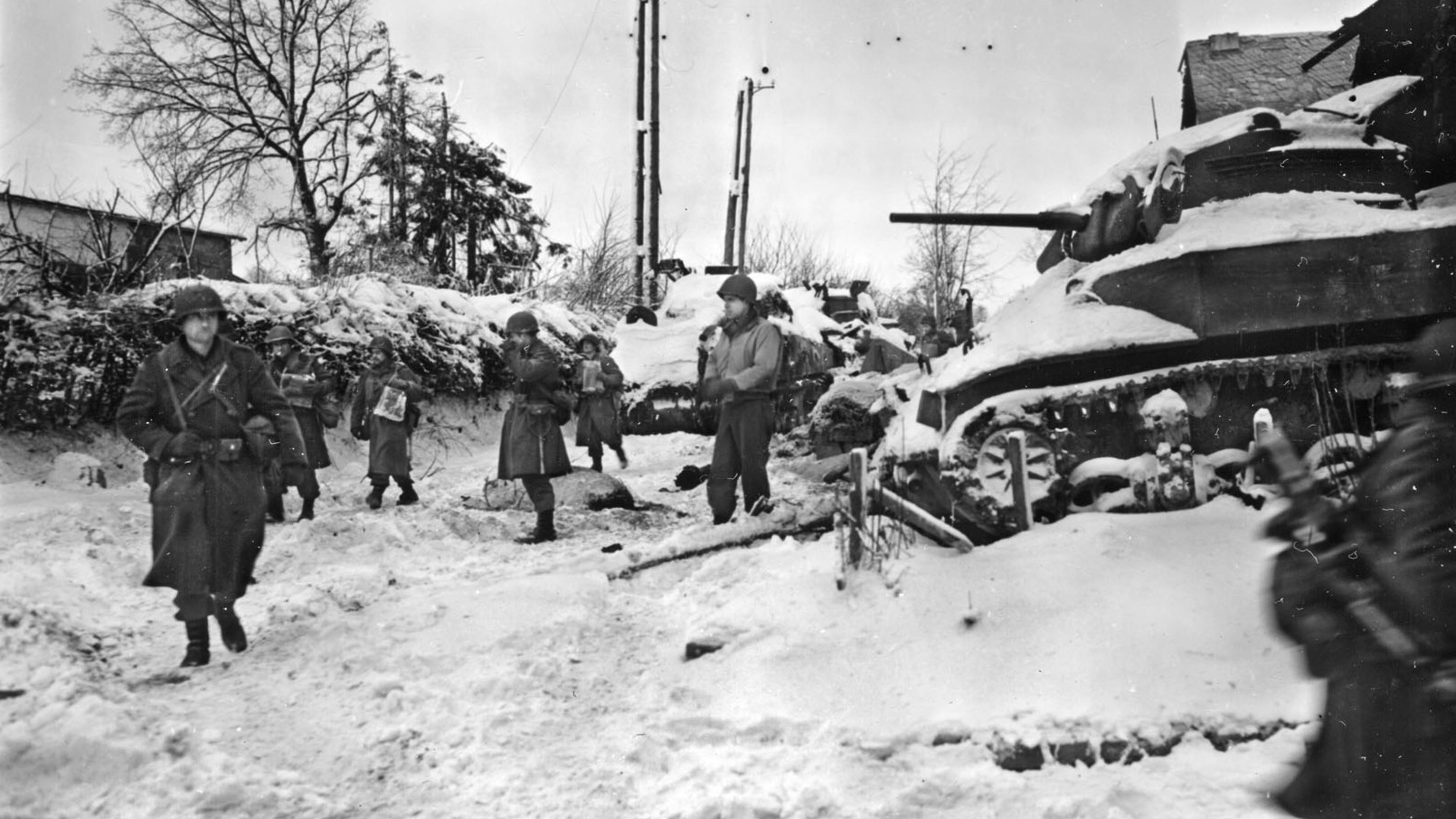
American soldiers of the 117th Infantry, part of the 30th Infantry Division, move past a destroyed American M5 "Stuart" tank on their march to recapture the town of St. Vith during the Battle of the Bulge in January 1945. Taken on 23 January 1945.

Campaign name	Date	Result
European Air Offensive	4 July 1942 – 5 June 1944	
Normandy Campaign	6 June – 24 July 1944	Allied success, Germans withdraw to central France.
Northern France Campaign	25 July – 14 September 1944	Allied success; Germans are driven out of Northern France but Allied offensives in France, Germany and the Netherlands stall.
Southern France Campaign	5 August – 14 September 1944	Allied victory, Germans are driven out of Southern France.
Ardennes-Alsace Campaign	16 December 1944 – 25 January 1945	Allied victory, German offensive is driven back.
Rhineland Campaign	15 September 1944 – 21 March 1945	Allied victory, Germans retreat across Rhine River.
Central Europe Campaign	22 March – 11 May 1945	Allies are triumphant, war in Europe ends with Germany's surrender.

=== Blanket campaigns ===
Campaign name	Date	Result
Anti-submarine campaign	7 December 1941 – 2 September 1945	
Ground Combat	7 December 1941 – 2 September 1945	
Air Combat	7 December 1941 – 2 September 1945	

== American Theater ==
The American Theater streamer.

=== Blanket Campaigns ===
Campaign name	Date	Result
Anti-submarine campaign	7 December 1941 – 2 September 1945	
