= Francis Asbury Roe =

United States Navy admiral (1823–1901)

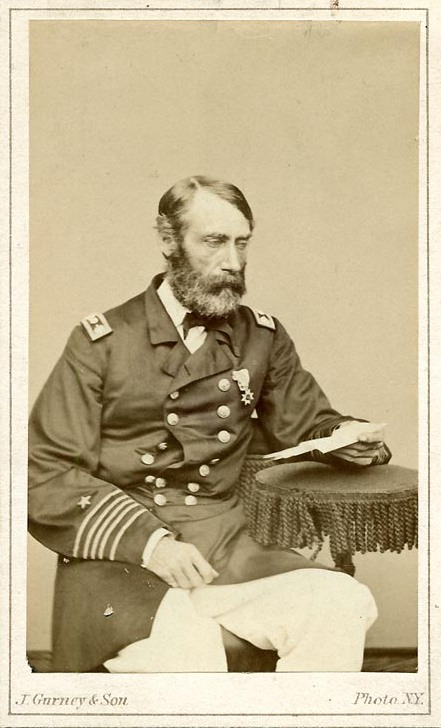
- Francis A. Roe, circa 1866
- Born: October 4, 1823; Elmira, New York
- Died: December 28, 1901 (aged 78); Washington, D.C.
- Burial place: Arlington National Cemetery
- Military career
- Allegiance: United States of America
- Branch: United States Navy
- Service years: 1841–1885
- Rank: Rear admiral
- Commands: Katahdin; Sassacus; Michigan; Tacony; Lancaster
- Conflicts: American Civil War

Francis Asbury Roe (October 4, 1823 – December 28, 1901) was an admiral in the United States Navy who served during the American Civil War.

== Biography ==
Born in Elmira, New York, Roe entered the United States Navy as a midshipman on October 19, 1841, and graduated from the United States Naval Academy in Annapolis, Maryland in 1848.

Roe left the Navy for eleven months, from June 1848 to May 1849, serving aboard the mail steamer SS Georgia.

After he returned to the Navy, he was assigned to the brigantine Porpoise and served in an expedition to chart the North Pacific. Cape Roe on the Japanese island of Tanegashima was named for him during this expedition. In 1854, while serving in Porpoise on the Asiatic Station, he participated in an engagement with 13 Chinese armored junks off Macau. Six of the junks were sunk and the others were scattered.

Roe received his commission as master on August 8, 1855, and as lieutenant on September 14 of the same year. From 1857 to 1858 he served in the United States Coast Survey.

During the Civil War, in April 1862, he was recommended for promotion for gallantry for his actions on board the screw steamer Pensacola while serving as executive officer, as that ship led Admiral David Farragut's starboard column past Fort Jackson and Fort St. Philip. He was promoted to lieutenant commander on July 16, 1862, and placed in command of the gunboat Katahdin on the Mississippi River. While commanding Katahdin, Roe defeated Confederate general John C. Breckinridge's attack on Baton Rouge, Louisiana.

Roe was ordered to command the side-wheel steamer Sassacus on the North Atlantic Blockading Squadron in September 1863, and captured and destroyed several blockade runners in the sounds of North Carolina. Eight months later he was again commended for gallantry for engaging the Confederate ram Albemarle and capturing the gunboat Bombshell on May 5, 1864.

After the end of the war, Roe commanded the iron-hulled warship Michigan on the Great Lakes, where he and his crew took action in the 1865 Upper Peninsula miners' strike. He was promoted to commander on July 25, 1866, and given command of the steamer Tacony on a special mission to Mexico. Roe served as fleet captain for the Asiatic Station from 1868 to 1871.

Roe was promoted to captain on April 1, 1872, and commanded the screw sloop Lancaster on the Brazil Station from 1874 to 1875. He was promoted to commodore on November 26, 1880, and to rear admiral on November 3, 1884, while serving as governor of the Naval Asylum at Philadelphia, Pennsylvania. He was transferred to the retired list on October 4, 1885.

Roe died in Washington, D.C., on December 28, 1901, aged 78, and is buried in Arlington National Cemetery.

== Honors ==
The United States Navy has named two destroyers USS Roe in his honor.
