= Mid-Atlantic seaboard =

Area of the eastern United States

The mid-Atlantic Seaboard is an area of the eastern United States along the Atlantic Ocean. The term's meaning changes depending on the user, but generally it always includes the seaports, coastal plains and United States territorial waters of Maryland, Delaware, and Virginia. It may also include the coastal plains and United States territorial waters of New Jersey, North Carolina, South Carolina, and even northern Georgia. Finally, it can also include the entirety of all of the previously mentioned states and Washington, DC.
