= Rainbow Bluff Expedition =

Operation during the American Civil War

- Part of the American Civil War
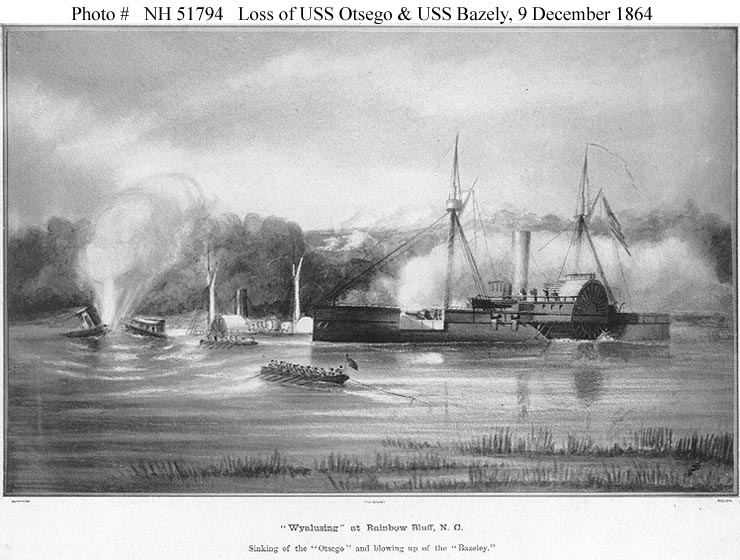
- Sinking of the Otsego and blowing up of the Bazeley
Date	December 9, 1864
Location	Roanoke, North Carolina
Result	Confederate victory

Belligerents
United States (Union)	(Confederate States of America) CSA (Confederacy)

Commanders and leaders
Rear admiral David Porter; Lieutenant colonel Innis N. Palmer	

Strength
2 Gunboats: Wyalusing; Otsego; Tugboat Bazely	Several Water mines

Casualties and losses
Otsego and Bazely sunk	none

The Rainbow Bluff Expedition took place on December 9, 1864, during the American Civil War. The Confederate water mines and reinforcement of their position on Rainbow Bluff caused the Union naval force to abandon the expedition.

== The expedition ==
On 9 December, an expedition, which included the gunboat USS Wyalusing, moved further up the Roanoke River to capture Rainbow Bluff and a Confederate naval ram, rumored to be under construction at Halifax, North Carolina.

While anchoring near Jamesville, North Carolina, USS Otsego, another gunboat, struck two torpedoes (Note: the name for naval mines at the time) and sank up to her gun deck. USS Bazely, a tug, moved alongside Otsego to offer assistance, but she also struck a torpedo and sank immediately.

Wyalusing and the remainder of the expedition left the two partially sunken ships under the protection of their own unsubmerged guns and headed upriver, cautiously dragging for torpedoes as they went. By the time they had reached the point of attack, the Confederate positions at Rainbow Bluff had been so well reinforced and the approaches so heavily strewn with torpedoes that the Union ships had to abandon the expedition. Wyalusing and her escorts returned to Plymouth, North Carolina on 28 December 1864 and resumed blockade and amphibious support duties.
