= List of shipwrecks in December 1864 =

The list of shipwrecks in December 1864 includes ships sunk, foundered, grounded, or otherwise lost during December 1864.

== 1 December ==
List of shipwrecks: 1 December 1864
Ship	State	Description
Amelia Hillman	United Kingdom	The ship was driven ashore at Odesa, Russia.
Caledonian	United Kingdom	The ship struck the Barnegat Rock, in Broad Sound and sank. She was later refloated and towed beached on the South Boston Flats.
Groningen	Netherlands	The galiot foundered in the Dogger Bank. Her crew were rescued. She was on a voyage from Groningen to Newcastle upon Tyne, Northumberland, United Kingdom.
Hannah	United Kingdom	The ship was driven ashore and wrecked at "Weak", Sweden. She was on a voyage from Christiania, Norway to Antwerp, Belgium.
Johanna Friedrich	Flag unknown	The ship departed from Pernambuco, Brazil for the English Channel. No further trace, presumed foundered with the loss of all hands.
Nymph	United States	The 35-ton sternwheel paddle steamer was stranded on the Ohio River at Louisville, Kentucky.
Stratton	United Kingdom	The brig collided with the barque Saxonville (United States) and the Cockle Lightship ( Trinity House). She was on a voyage from Hartlepool, County Durham to Jersey, Channel Islands. She put in at Lowestoft, Suffolk.

== 2 December ==
List of shipwrecks: 2 December 1864
Ship	State	Description
Cronos	Flag unknown	The schooner was run into and sunk by the steamship Anglia (United Kingdom) off the coast of Essex, United Kingdom. All eight people on board were rescued by Anglia. Cronos was on a voyage from "Zvenborg" to London, United Kingdom.
Mahoning	United States	Mahoning, 11 June 2022. While under tow to Milwaukee, Wisconsin, by the tug W. K. Muir (United States) for repairs after stranding on a beach near Sheboygan, Wisconsin, in November 1864, the 119-foot (36 m) brigantine sprang a leak and sank in 55 feet (17 m) of water in Lake Michigan midway between Racine, Wisconsin, and Milwaukee at 43°20.432′N 087°51.21′W with the loss of two lives. Her wreck lies in the Wisconsin Shipwreck Coast National Marine Sanctuary.
Southerner	United Kingdom	The ship .

== 3 December ==
List of shipwrecks: 3 December 1864
Ship	State	Description
Augusta	Prussia	The ship was abandoned at sea. Her crew survived. She was on a voyage from Rügenwalde to Leith, Lothian, United Kingdom.
Betsy	United Kingdom	The fishing lugger was run down and sunk in the North Sea 30 nautical miles (56 km) off the coast of Norfolk by the brig Prosperity (Norway). Her eleven crew were rescued by Prosperity.
Cato	United Kingdom	The schooner foundered in the Irish Sea 14 nautical miles (26 km) south west of St. Ann's Head, Pembrokeshire. Her crew were rescued by Capella (Sweden). Cato was on a voyage from Gloucester to Liverpool, Lancashire.
Eliza	Flag unknown	The wooden barge sank in the Sacramento River off Washington, California, after colliding with Governor Dana (Flag unknown).
Elizabeth Martha	United Kingdom	The schooner was driven ashore in the Cymyran Strait, Anglesey. Her crew were rescued. She was on a voyage from Swansea, Glamorgan to Liverpool.
Ella	Confederate States of America	American Civil War, Union blockade: The 634-gross register ton sidewheel paddle steamer, a blockade runner with a cargo of Holland gin, munitions, and rifle muskets, was forced aground near the lighthouse at Bald Head Point off Fort Holmes, North Carolina by the armed screw steamer USS Emma and gunboat USS Pequot (both United States Navy). Six ships of the South Atlantic Blockading Squadron (United States Navy) and Confederate artillery shelled Ella for two days, hitting her at least 40 times, before a United States Navy boat party boarded and burned her on 5 December.
Fils Unique	France	The ship ran aground on the Holm Sand, in the North Sea. She was on a voyage from Newcastle upon Tyne, Northumberland, United Kingdom to Livorno, Italy. She was refloated and put in to Great Yarmouth, Norfolk in a leaky condition.
Hermione	United Kingdom	The ship was driven ashore near Dungeness, Kent. She was on a voyage from Hull, Yorkshire to Málaga, Spain. She was refloated and taken in to Ramsgate, Kent in a leaky condition.
Rachela	Italy	The brig ran ashore and was severely damaged in the River Severn downstream of Berkeley, Gloucestershire, United Kingdom. She was on a voyage from Constanţa, Ottoman Empire to Gloucester, United Kingdom. She was dismantled in situ.
Resolution	United Kingdom	The ship foundered in the North Sea. Her crew survived. She was on a voyage from Danzig to London.

== 4 December ==
List of shipwrecks: 4 December 1864
Ship	State	Description
British India	United Kingdom	The ship ran aground in the Hooghly River. She was on a voyage from Calcutta to Bombay, India. She was refloated and resumed her voyage.
Edward	United States	American Civil War: The 274-ton whaler, a barque, was captured and burned in the South Atlantic Ocean off Tristan da Cunha by the merchant raider CSS Shenandoah (Confederate States Navy).
HMS Virago	Royal Navy	The steamship ran aground in the West Indies. She was refloated and returned to service.
Jane	United Kingdom	The schooner was driven ashore west of Wells-next-the-Sea, Norfolk.
Mary	United Kingdom	The schooner sprang a leak and foundered in the English Channel off Dungeness, Kent. Her crew were rescued. She was on a voyage from Looe, Cornwall to Dover, Kent.
Reliance	(United Kingdom of Great Britain and Ireland) Guernsey	The brig ran aground on the Kentish Knock. She was refloated and assisted in to Harwich, Essex.
Scawfell	United Kingdom	The full-rigged ship ran aground in the River Wear. She was on a voyage from Sunderland, County Durham to Hong Kong. She was refloated and taken in to Sunderland for repairs.

== 5 December ==
List of shipwrecks: 5 December 1864
Ship	State	Description
Fürst Louis Wittgenstein	Prussia	The ship was driven ashore and wrecked at Schwarzort. She was on a voyage form London, United Kingdom to Memel.
Harwich	United Kingdom	The steamship ran aground at Brielle, South Holland, Netherlands. She was on a voyage from Harwich, Essex to Rotterdam, South Holland. She was refloated.
Johanna	Stettin	The ship foundered in the North Sea. Her crew were rescued. She was on a voyage from Newcastle upon Tyne, Northumberland, United Kingdom to Stettin.
Johann Wilhelm	Norway	The ship ran aground north west of Bergen. She had sunk by 9 December.
Lizzie Freeman	United States	American Civil War: While at anchor, the tug was captured and destroyed on the James River off Pagan Creek near Smithfield, Virginia, Confederate States of America, by a Confederate States Navy boarding party.
Poictiers	United Kingdom	The barque was abandoned, leaking, off Cape Horn, Chile. The crew of seventeen were rescued by the barque Nankin (France). Poictiers was on a voyage from Cardiff, Glamorgan to Callao, Peru with coal.
Swallow	United Kingdom	The steamship ran aground at Brielle. She was on a voyage from Rotterdam to Hull, Yorkshire. She was refloated.
William Buchanan	(United Kingdom of Great Britain and Ireland) New South Wales	The barque caught fire off the Clarence Heads. She was beached and burnt out. Her crew were rescued. She was on a voyage from Sydney to Rockhampton, Queensland.
Unidentified schooner	United States	American Civil War: Carrying a cargo of sutler′s goods, the schooner was captured and burned on the James River off Pagan Creek near Smithfield by a Confederate States Navy boarding party.

== 6 December ==
List of shipwrecks: 6 December 1864
Ship	State	Description
Alabama	Confederate States of America	American Civil War, Union blockade: The schooner, a blockade runner, was forced aground on the coast of Texas near San Luis Pass by the cruiser USS Princess Royal (United States Navy). A boarding party from Princess Royal captured and refloated her.
Botanist	United Kingdom	The ship ran aground on a wreck in the Hooghly River.
Earl Grey	United Kingdom	The brig ran aground and was wrecked off Anholt, Denmark with the loss of two of her eight crew. Survivors were rescued on 12 December by a boat from Læsø. She was refloated in January 1865 and taken in to Fredrikshavn, where she was condemned.
Energy	United Kingdom	The ship departed from Gibraltar for an English port. No further trace, presumed foundered with the loss of all hands.
Halicore	United Kingdom	The brig struck a sunken rock new Ny-Hellesund, Norway and was abandoned. She was on a voyage from Newcastle upon Tyne, Northumberland to Copenhagen, Denmark. She floated off and sank.
Lincolnshire	United Kingdom	The ship was severely damaged by fire at Calcutta, India. She was condemned.
Margaret	United Kingdom	The schooner was driven ashore near Warkworth, Northumberland. She was on a voyage from Faro, Portugal to Leith, Lothian.
Sifa	Norway	The brig was abandoned in the North Sea. Her crew were rescued. Shew as on a voyage from Newcastle upon Tyne to Drammen.
Stormy Petrel	United Kingdom	The steamship struck a sunken wreck and was wrecked at Wilmington, Delaware, United States.

== 7 December ==
List of shipwrecks: 7 December 1864
Ship	State	Description
Alexander Cochrane	United Kingdom	The schooner ran aground on the Herd Sand, in the North Sea off the coast of County Durham. She was on a voyage from Dieppe, Seine-Inférieure, France to North Shields, Northumberland. She was refloated and taken in to North Shields.
Bravo	United Kingdom	The yawl was abandoned off the coast of Norfolk. Her crew were rescued by the Great Yarmouth Lifeboat.
Emma, and Margaret	United Kingdom	The brig Margaret collided with the steamship Emma and sank off Southwold, Suffolk with the loss of two of her five crew. Survivors were rescued by Emma. She was on a voyage from Hartlepool, County Durham to London.Margaret was on a voyage from Christiansand, Norway to London. Holed at the bow, she put in to Great Yarmouth, Norfolk as she was in danger of sinking.
Glendower	United Kingdom	The ship was wrecked on the Pratas Shoal. Her crew were rescued. She was on a voyage from Bangkok, Siam to Hong Kong.
Iowa	United Kingdom	The steamship struck rocks at Octeville, Manche, France. She put in to Octeville and sank. She was on a voyage from London to Havre de Grâce, Seine-Inférieure, France and New York, United States.
James Richard Hindson	United Kingdom	The barque foundered in the North Sea. Her crew were rescued by Futtaak (United Kingdom). She was on a voyage from Sunderland, County Durham to Hamburg.
USS Narcissus	United States Navy	American Civil War, Union blockade: The tug struck a Confederate mine in Mobile Bay off Mobile, Alabama, during a heavy storm and sank without loss of life. She was raised in December, repaired and returned to service early in 1865.
Stormy Petrel	United Kingdom	American Civil War, Union blockade: Trying to a run the Union blockade and reach Wilmington, North Carolina, Confederate States of America, with a cargo that included arms and ammunition, the 220-register ton sidewheel paddle steamer was forced aground on the coast of North Carolina off New Inlet and Smith Island 1 nautical mile (1.9 km) below Fort Fisher by the gunboat USS Kansas (United States Navy). Under fire by gunboats of the North Atlantic Blockading Squadron (United States Navy), she was holed by the fluke of a submerged anchor. She finally was destroyed by a gale a few days later.
Zornizza	Austrian Empire	The brig was wrecked on Scroby Sands, Norfolk. Her thirteen crew were rescued by the Great Yarmouth Lifeboat. She was on a voyage from London to Sunderland, County Durham, United Kingdom.

== 8 December ==
List of shipwrecks: 8 December 1864
Ship	State	Description
Claramont	United Kingdom	The ship departed from Ascension Island for London. No further trace, presumed foundered with the loss of all hands.
Coaxer	United Kingdom	The barque collided with a barge, was holed by the barge's anchor, and sank in the River Thames at Blackwall, Middlesex. She was on a voyage from South Shields, County Durham to London.
Marion, and an unnamed vessel	United Kingdom; Ottoman Empire)	Marion collided with another vessel at Üsküdar and both were beached. Marion was on a voyage from Falmouth, Cornwall to Sulina.
Mary Ann	Confederate States of America	American Civil War, Union blockade: The sloop, a blockade runner with a cargo of cotton, was forced aground and destroyed by the gunboat USS Itasca (United States Navy) at Pass Cavallo, Texas.
Perfecta	Spain	The brig was wrecked on the Pratas Shoal with the loss of four of her crew. She was on a voyage from Manila, Spanish East Indies to Hong Kong.
Reform	Norway	The ship was lost near Lemvig. Her crew were rescued. She was on a voyage from London, United Kingdom to Kragerø.
Salem	United Kingdom	The ship was wrecked on the Haisborough Sands, in the North Sea off the coast of Norfolk. Her crew survived. She was on a voyage from Memel, Prussia to London. She later floated off, and came ashore at Cromer, Norfolk on 23 December.

== 9 December ==
List of shipwrecks: 9 December 1864
Ship	State	Description
Alicia Bland	United Kingdom	The ship ran aground on the Middle Point Flat, in the Hooghly River. She was refloated.
USS Bazely	United States Navy	Harper's Weekly illustration from 21 January 1865 of USS Bazely striking the mine. American Civil War: The tug sank instantly with the loss of two lives after striking a Confederate mine in the Roanoke River near Jamesville, Confederate States of America, while coming to the aid of the gunboat USS Otsego (United States Navy). Her wreck was destroyed on 25 December to prevent its capture by Confederate forces.
Ben South	United States	American Civil War: The 176-ton sidewheel paddle steamer was burned on the Cumberland River at Cumberland City, Tennessee, by troops of Confederate States Army Brigadier General Hylan B. Lyon′s brigade).
Echo	United States	American Civil War: The 100-ton steam towboat was burned on the Cumberland River at Cumberland City, Tennessee, by troops of Confederate States Army Brigadier General Hylan B. Lyon′s brigade.
Hendrika	Netherlands	The ship was driven ashore at "Tramun". She was on a voyage from Danzig to Amsterdam, North Holland. She was consequently condemned.
Leader	(United Kingdom of Great Britain and Ireland) British North America	The schooner was wrecked at Well Cove, Newfoundland. Only one of her eight crew survived to be rescued by the sealing schooner Lilly Dale ( (United Kingdom of Great Britain and Ireland) British North America) on 21 March 1865. Leader was on a voyage from Montreal, Province of Canada to Saint John's, Newfoundland.
Lucy	United Kingdom	The brig was driven ashore at Boulmer, Northumberland. She was on a voyage from South Shields, County Durham to Hamburg. She was refloated.
USS Otsego	United States Navy	American Civil War: The gunboat sank after striking two Confederate mines in the Roanoke River near Jamesville, North Carolina. Her wreck was blown up on either 9 or 25 December to prevent its capture by Confederate forces.
Robert B. Howlett	United States	The 120- or 246-ton schooner was wrecked on Charleston Bar or North Bar off the coast of South Carolina, Confederate States of America, during a hurricane.
Thomas E. Tutt	United States	American Civil War: Carrying Union Army troops and a cargo of oats, the 351-ton sidewheel paddle steamer was captured and burned on the Cumberland River at Cumberland City, Tennessee, by troops of Confederate States Army Brigadier General Hylan B. Lyon′s brigade.
Wave	United Kingdom	The brig was driven ashore at Filey, Yorkshire.
Two unidentified barges	United States	American Civil War: The barges were captured and burned on the Cumberland River at Cumberland City, Tennessee, by troops of Confederate States Army Brigadier General Hylan B. Lyon′s brigade.
Unidentified steamer	United States	American Civil War: The steamer was captured and burned on the Cumberland River at Cumberland City, Tennessee, by troops of Confederate States Army Brigadier General Hylan B. Lyon′s brigade.

== 10 December ==
List of shipwrecks: 10 December 1864
Ship	State	Description
Bermondsey	United Kingdom	The ship was driven ashore near Walmer Castle, Kent. She was on a voyage from London to Pernambuco, Brazil. She was refloated and taken in to The Downs.
Countess of Galloway	United Kingdom	The paddle steamer ran aground in the River Dee near Kirkcudbright. She was on a voyage from Liverpool, Lancashire to Kirkcudbright. She was refloated and taken in to Kirkcudbright for repairs.
Governor	United Kingdom	The brig was driven ashore at the Girdle Ness Lighthouse, Aberdeen. She was on a voyage from Kronstadt, Russia to South Shields, County Durham. She was refloated and taken in to Aberdeen in a leaky condition.
CSS Ida	Confederate States Navy	American Civil War: The 77-ton sidewheel paddle steamer was captured and burned by a detachment of the 150th New York Infantry Regiment (Union Army) near Argyle Island, Georgia.
Mary Mitcheson	United Kingdom	The brig was towed in to Norrköping, Sweden in a derelict condition.
Phryne	(United Kingdom of Great Britain and Ireland) British North America	The ship was abandoned in the Atlantic Ocean 30 nautical miles (56 km) off Cape Ortegal, Spain. Her crew took to three boats; one boat with ten crew on board reached land, the other two boats were reported missing. She was on a voyage from Saint John, New Brunswick to Liverpool. She was discovered on 6 January 1865 by the steamship RMS Armenian (United Kingdom), which put a volunteer crew on board. Phryne was abandoned and set afire on 14 January. Those on board were rescued by the steamship Venetia (United Kingdom).
USS Picket Boat No. 5	United States Navy	The torpedo boat sank in the James River opposite Jamestown, Virginia. She was raised, repaired, and returned to service.
Vision	Rostock	The ship was abandoned in the Atlantic Ocean. Her crew survived.

== 11 December ==
List of shipwrecks: 11 December 1864
Ship	State	Description
Burnside	United Kingdom	The barque was abandoned in the Atlantic Ocean 900 nautical miles (1,700 km) west of Cape Clear Island, County Cork with the loss of all but three of her sixteen crew. Survivors were rescued by the steamship City of Dublin (United Kingdom). Burnside was on a voyage from New York to Greenock, Renfrewshire.
Fame	United Kingdom	The ship ran aground at Cairnryan, Wigtownshire. She was on a voyage from "Bazalt" to Glasgow, Renfrewshire. She was refloated on 16 December.
Lancaster	United Kingdom	The brig ran aground on the Scroby Sands, Norfolk. She was on a voyage from Hartlepool, County Durham to Rochester, Kent. She was refloated and taken in to Lowestoft, Suffolk in a leaky condition.
Pearl	United Kingdom	The smack was abandoned off the coast of Anglesey. Her crew were rescued by the Penmon Lifeboat. She was reboarded the next day.
Speedwell	United Kingdom	The smack was abandoned off the coast of Anglesey. Her crew were rescued by the Penmon Lifeboat. She was reboarded the next day.
Wilton Wood	United Kingdom	The brig was driven ashore at Great Yarmouth, Norfolk. Her crew were rescued. She was on a voyage from Sunderland, County Durham to London.

== 12 December ==
List of shipwrecks: 12 December 1864
Ship	State	Description
CSS Resolute	Confederate States Navy	American Civil War: Under heavy fire by the 1st New York Artillery Regiment (Union Army) on the Savannah River in Georgia, the armed tug was disabled in a collision with the gunboat CSS Macon (Confederate States Navy) and ran aground on Argyle Island, where she was captured and burned later in the day by a detachment of the 3rd Wisconsin Veteran Infantry Regiment (Union Army).
Rovino	Austrian Empire	The barque was driven ashore at Roughley Point, County Sligo, United Kingdom.
South Downs	United Kingdom	The ship ran aground on the Galloper Sandbank, in the English Channel. She was refloated and put in to Portsmouth, Hampshire in a leaky condition.
Young Nova Scotian	United States	The ship was driven ashore in the Gut of Canso. She was on a voyage from Annapolis, Maryland to Pictou, Nova Scotia, British North America. She had become a wreck by 27 December.

== 13 December ==
List of shipwrecks: 13 December 1864
Ship	State	Description
Advance	United Kingdom	The schooner was driven ashore at Mogador, Morocco. Her crew were rescued.
Felix	Portugal	The ship sank in the Tagus.
Lusitano	Portugal	The ship sank in the Tagus.
Maroc	France	The steamship was driven ashore and severely damaged at Mogador. Her crew were rescued.
Mignonette	United Kingdom	The brig was wrecked at Mogador with the loss of all but two of her crew.
Vigilant	United Kingdom	The tug was run into by a barge and nearly sunk off Hartlepool, County Durham.
Zaped	Austrian Empire	The brig was wrecked near Cezembra, Portugal with the loss of seven of her crew. She was on a voyage from Odesa, Russia to Queenstown, County Cork, United Kingdom.
Unidentified vessels	Confederate States of America	American Civil War, Union blockade: The armed screw steamer USS Daylight (United States Navy) destroyed a large flat-bottomed boat and a skiff in the James River area of Virginia.

== 14 December ==
List of shipwrecks: 14 December 1864
Ship	State	Description
HMS Bombay	Royal Navy	HMS Bombay The screw ship-of-the-line was destroyed by fire while conducting target practice in the River Plate near Isla de Flores off Uruguay, killing 86 of her crew of 616.
Christian	United Kingdom	The ship struck a sunken wreck. She was on a voyage from Sundsvall, Sweden to London. She put in to Harwich, Essex in a severely leaky condition.
Christiana	United Kingdom	The brig was wrecked at Motril, Spain. She was on a voyage from Málaga, Spain to Newcastle upon Tyne, Northumberland.
Elise	Hamburg	The galeas was driven ashore near Norderney, Kingdom of Hanover. Her crew were rescued. She was on a voyage from Middlesbrough, Yorkshire, United Kingdom to Hamburg.
Eliza Edwards	United Kingdom	The ship was driven ashore and wrecked at Lisbon, Portugal. She was on a voyage from Pomaron, Portugal to Liverpool, Lancashire.
Gratitude	United Kingdom	The ship was run down and sunk in the North Sea by Diamond (United Kingdom). Gratitude was on a voyage from South Shields, County Durham to London.
Lancaster	United Kingdom	The barque was driven ashore at "Pisarinco". She was on a voyage from Saint John, New Brunswick, British North America to the Clyde. She was refloated on 28 December and put back to Saint John.
Laura	United Kingdom	The brig ran aground on Holy Isle, in the Firth of Clyde. She was on a voyage from Glasgow, Renfrewshire to Barbados. She was refloated and resumed her voyage.
Victoria	Prussia	The barque was driven ashore on Skagen, Denmark. She was on a voyage from Newcastle upon Tyne, Northumberland, United Kingdom to Copenhagen, Denmark. She was refloated and resumed her voyage.
Victoria Regina	United Kingdom	The ship was wrecked on the Corton Sands, in the North Sea off the coast of Suffolk. Her crew were rescued. She was on a voyage from South Shields to Madeira.
Wilson Wood	United Kingdom	The ship was driven ashore at Great Yarmouth, Norfolk. Her crew were rescued. She was on a voyage from Sunderland, County Durham to London.
Unnamed	United Kingdom	The collier, steamship, collided with Antona (Flag unknown) and sank at Greenock, Renfrewshire.

== 15 December ==
List of shipwrecks: 15 December 1864
Ship	State	Description
Alfred	United Kingdom	The ship ran aground on the Newcombe Sand, in the North Sea off the coast of Suffolk. She was on a voyage from Sunderland, County Durham to Ipswich, Suffolk. She was refloated and put in to Lowestoft, Suffolk in a leaky condition.
Appoline	United Kingdom	The ship was wrecked on Lobos Island, Canary Islands. Her crew were rescued. She was on a voyage from London to Buenos Aires, Argentina.
Eduardo	United Kingdom	The schooner was driven ashore and wrecked at Mazagan, Morocco. Her crew were rescued.
Essay	United Kingdom	The brig ran aground off the coast of Essex. She was on a voyage from Seaham, County Durham to London. She was refloated and put in to Harwich, Essex in a severely leaky condition.
Général Athalia	France	The ship was wrecked on Lobos Island. Her crew were rescued. She was on a voyage from Bordeaux, Gironde to Montevideo, Uruguay.
New Express	United Kingdom	The brig ran aground on the Corton Sands, in the North Sea off the coast of Suffolk. She was on a voyage from Leith, Lothian to Dieppe, Seine-Inférieure, France. She was refloated and towed in to Lowestoft in a leaky condition.
Sea	United Kingdom	The barque was wrecked on the Corton Sands, in the North Sea off the coast of Suffolk with the loss of all ten crew. She was on a voyage from Hartlepool, County Durham to Havre de Grâce, Seine-Inférieure.
Supply	United Kingdom	The brig ran aground off Pakefield, Suffolk, She was on a voyage from Seaham to Southampton, Hampshire. She was refloated and assisted in to Lowestoft in a leaky condition.
Una	United Kingdom	The schooner ran aground on the Herd Sand, in the North Sea off the coast of County Durham. She was refloated and taken in to North Shields, Northumberland.
Virginia	Confederate States of America	The ship foundered off the French coast with the loss of all hands. A message in a bottle picked up at Berkeley, Gloucestershire byIndustry (United Kingdom) on 19 January 1865 gave the news.
West	(United Kingdom of Great Britain and Ireland) British North America	The steamship was wrecked at "Matana". She was on a voyage from Montreal, Province of Quebec to Halifax, Nova Scotia.
Unidentified vessels	Confederate States of America	American Civil War, Union blockade: A boat expedition from the armed sidewheel paddle steamer USS Coeur de Lion and the warship USS Mercury (both United States Navy) burned two scows and 31 boats on the Coan River in Virginia.

== 16 December ==
List of shipwrecks: 16 December 1864
Ship	State	Description
Andhild	Danzig	The ship ran aground on the Galloper Sand, in the English Channel off the coast of Sussex, United Kingdom. She was on a voyage from Danzig to Cagliari, Sardinia, Italy. She was refloated on 18 December and taken in to Portsmouth, Hampshire, United Kingdom.
Catherina	United Kingdom	The schooner collided with the smack Leonora (United Kingdom) and foundered in the English Channel off The Lizard, Cornwall with the loss of all but her captain – five lives. She was on a voyage from Port Madoc, Caernarfonshire to Milton Regis, Kent.
Felix Mafalda	Portugal	The brig sank in the Tagus.
General Garibaldi	Italy	The barque broke from her moorings and was driven in to Adelphi (United Kingdom) off Great Yarmouth, Norfolk, United Kingdom and was abandoned by her crew. She was then boarded by four crew of Adelphi and taken in to Great Yarmouth in a severely leaky condition.
G. O. Bigelow	Confederate States of America	American Civil War, Union blockade: The schooner, in ballast, was captured and burned by the screw steamer USS Mount Vernon (United States Navy) at Bear Inlet, North Carolina.
Lasitano	Portugal	The brig sank in the Tagus.
Marcia	United States	The ship was driven ashore on Cranberry Island. She was on a voyage from Glace Bay to New York. She was a total loss.

== 17 December ==
List of shipwrecks: 17 December 1864
Ship	State	Description
Earl of Aberdeen	United Kingdom	The ship was wrecked on Scroby Sands, Norfolk.
Killingworth	United Kingdom	The steamship struck the pier at Hartlepool, County Durham and was damaged. She was consequently beached. She was on a voyage from London to West Hartlepool.

== 18 December ==
List of shipwrecks: 18 December 1864
Ship	State	Description
Alida Theodora	Denmark	The ship was driven ashore at Aberdeen, United Kingdom. She was refloated the next day and taken in to Aberdeen.
Billow	United Kingdom	The schooner foundered off the coast of Cornwall. She was on a voyage from Llanelly, Glamorgan to Hayle, Cornwall.
Chee Paon Yeng	China	The steamship was destroyed by fire at Foo Chow Foo.
Cygnet	United Kingdom	The ship was sighted in the Dardanelles whilst on a voyage from Odesa, Russia to a British port. No further trace, presumed foundered with the loss of all hands.
Ellen Fair	United Kingdom	The schooner foundered off the coast of Cornwall. She was on a voyage from Neath, Glamorgan to Portneath, Cornwall.
J. S. T.	United Kingdom	The schooner foundered off the coast of Cornwall. She was on a voyage from Llanelly to Demerara, British Guiana.
Lalenn	Prussia	The brig was wrecked on the Haisborough Sands, in the North Sea off the coast of Norfolk, United Kingdom. Her crew were rescued. She was on a voyage from Memel to London, United Kingdom. Lalenn came ashore a Cromer, Norfolk in a capsized condition.
Salisbury	United Kingdom	The schooner collided with Naomi (United Kingdom) and was beached on Lundy Island, Devon. She was on a voyage from Liverpool, Lancashire to Newport, Monmouthshire. She was refloated on 19 December and towed in the Hubberston, Pembrokeshire.
Speculation	United Kingdom	The brig was driven ashore at Hartlepool, County Durham. She was on a voyage from Danzig to London. She was refloated on 22 December and taken in to Hartlepool.

== 19 December ==
List of shipwrecks: 19 December 1864
Ship	State	Description
Frederick and Louisa	United Kingdom	The brig was driven ashore at "Wistrow". She was on a voyage from Hartlepool, County Durham to Wismar.
Mary Jane	United Kingdom	The schooner was driven ashore and severely damaged at Fraserburgh, Aberdeenshire. She was on a voyage from Runcorn, Cheshire to Fisherrow, Aberdeenshire. She was refloated and taken in to Fraserburgh in a severely leaky condition.
Oceano	Italy	The brig was driven ashore and wrecked 6 nautical miles (11 km) west of Tarifa, Spain. She was on a voyage from Odesa, Russia to Queenstown, County Cork, United Kingdom.
Vivid	United Kingdom	The smack was wrecked on the Cross Sands, in the North Sea off the coast of Norfolk with the loss of all hands.
CSS Water Witch	Confederate States Navy	American Civil War, Union blockade: The sidewheel gunboat was burned at White Bluff, Georgia, to prevent her capture by Union forces.

== 20 December ==
List of shipwrecks: 20 December 1864
Ship	State	Description
Alexandrina	United Kingdom	The ship ran aground off Dundee, Forfarshire. She was on a voyage from Stettin to Dundee. She was refloated and taken in to Dundee in a leaky condition.
Heinrich	Prussia	The ship ran aground on the Hillarp Reef, in the Baltic Sea. She was on a voyage from Sunderland, County Durham, United Kingdom to Wolgast. She was refloated and resumed her voyage.

== 21 December ==
List of shipwrecks: 21 December 1864
Ship	State	Description
Æolus	United Kingdom	The ship was driven ashore and wrecked near Nairn. She was on a voyage from Memel, Prussia to Leith, Lothian.
Cosopolite	United Kingdom	The ship put in to Stanley, Falkland Islands on fire and was scuttled. She was on a voyage from Swansea, Glamorgan to Valparaíso, Chile. She was refloated.
CSS Firefly	Confederate States Navy	American Civil War: The armed tender, a sidewheel paddle steamer, was burned at Savannah, Georgia, to prevent her capture by Union forces.
CSS Georgia	Confederate States Navy	American Civil War: The ironclad warship, serving as a floating battery, was scuttled at Savannah (32°5′5″N 81°2′9″W) to prevent her capture by Union forces.
CSS Isondiga	Confederate States Navy	American Civil War: The gunboat was destroyed at Savannah to prevent her capture by Union forces.
Little Nell	United Kingdom	The ship foundered in the North Sea off the coast of Essex with the loss of all hands. She was on a voyage from Milford Haven, Pembrokeshire to Colchester, Essex.
Lord Riversdale	United Kingdom	The ship was abandoned in the Atlantic Ocean 300 nautical miles (560 km) south west of the Isles of Scilly.
Martha and Mary	United Kingdom	The schooner foundered 9 nautical miles (17 km) south south east of the Arklow Lightship ( Trinity House). Her crew were rescued by the steamship Aurora (United Kingdom). Martha and Mary was on a voyage from Ardrossan, Ayrshire to Newport, Monmouthshire.
Milledgeville	Confederate States of America	American Civil War: The incomplete ironclad was burned to the waterline and scuttled at Savannah to prevent her capture by Union forces.
CSS Savannah	Confederate States Navy	American Civil War: The casemate ironclad was burned at Savannah to prevent her capture by Union forces.
Swan	Confederate States of America	American Civil War: The 316-ton screw steamer was burned and sunk at Savannah to prevent her capture by Union forces. She was raised in July 1865, refitted, and returned to service.

== 22 December ==
List of shipwrecks: 22 December 1864
Ship	State	Description
Alicia Anne	United Kingdom	The brig struck the wreck of City of New York (United States) and was beached at Queenstown, County Cork. She was on a voyage from Manila, Spanish East Indies to Liverpool, Lancashire.
Crown	United Kingdom	The smack sank 6 nautical miles (11 km) north of the Copeland Islands, County Donegal. Her crew were rescued. She was on a voyage from Ardrossan, Ayrshire to Dundalk, County Louth.
Lord Redesdale	United Kingdom	The ship foundered in the Bay of Biscay. Her crew were rescued by the barque Ilma (Russia).
Mary and Elizabeth	(United Kingdom of Great Britain and Ireland) New Zealand	The ketch was wrecked at the mouth of the Saltwater Creek, North Canterbury when she caught the south spit of Saltwater Creek/Ashley River estuary. She was carrying timber from Lyttelton Harbour.
Muirhead	United Kingdom	The barque was driven ashore and wrecked near St. Mary's, Newfoundland, British North America. She was on a voyage from Shediac, New Brunswick, British North America to Liverpool.
Thomas Lea	United Kingdom	The steamship was run into by a barque and was beached on the Maplin Sand, in the North Sea off the coast of Essex. She was on a voyage from North Shields, Northumberland to London. She was refloated and taken in to Gravesend, Kent.
Xenophon	Greece	The brig was abandoned off Mine Head, County Waterford, United Kingdom. She was on a voyage from Waterford to Swansea, Glamorgan, United Kingdom.. She was taken in to Cork by a pilot boat.

== 23 December ==
List of shipwrecks: 23 December 1864
Ship	State	Description
Anna	Kingdom of Hanover	The brig ran aground and was wrecked at the mouth of the Rio Grande. Her crew were rescued. She was on a voyage from Cádiz, Spain to the Rio Grande.
Asia	United Kingdom	The ship was wrecked at the mouth of the Rio Grande. Her crew were rescued.
Calliance	United Kingdom	The full-rigged ship ran aground on a reef in the Pacific Ocean (15°32′S 123°03′E). She was on a voyage from Melbourne, Australia to Camden Harbour, Western Australia. She was refloated on 25 December and taken in to Camden Harbour.
Elizabeth	United Kingdom	The brig collided with the steamship Lotus (United Kingdom) and sank 12 nautical miles (22 km) west south west of The Smalls. Her crew were rescued by Lotus. Elizabeth was on a voyage from Demerara, British Guiana to Liverpool, Lancashire.
Frelich	Hamburg	The brig ran aground on the Herd Sand, in the North Sea off the coast of County Durham, United Kingdom. She was on her maiden voyage, from Kalmar, Sweden to Bahia, Brazil. She was refloated.
Highland Chief	United Kingdom	The full-rigged ship ran aground on the Haddock Bank, in the North Sea off the coast of Lincolnshire. She was on a voyage from Newcastle upon Tyne, Northumberland to Genoa, Italy.
Idas	France	The schooner was driven ashore at Sea Palling, Norfolk, United Kingdom. Her crew were rescued by the Palling Lifeboat Parsee (United Kingdom). She was on a voyage from Danzig to Dunkirk, Nord. Idas was refloated on 10 January 1865 and taken in to Great Yarmouth.
Ithuriel	United Kingdom	The ship ran aground near Ramsgate, Kent. She was on a voyage from London to Berbice and/or Demerara, British Guiana.
North American	United States	The steamship foundered in the Gulf of Mexico with the loss of 197 of the 259 people on board. Survivors were rescued by the barque Mary E. Libby (United Kingdom). North American was on a voyage from New Orleans, Louisiana, Confederate States of America to New York.
Thames	United Kingdom	The barque ran aground in the Dardanelles. She was refloated.
Thor	Denmark	The brig ran aground on the Longsand, in the North Sea off the coast of Essex, United Kingdom. Her crew were rescued by Crown (United Kingdom).

== 24 December ==
List of shipwrecks: 24 December 1864
Ship	State	Description
CSS Arctic	Confederate States Navy	American Civil War: The floating battery was scuttled as a blockship in the Cape Fear River off Fort Fisher, North Carolina.
Cornelie	France	The brig was driven ashore and wrecked at Cromer, Norfolk, United Kingdom. Her crew were rescued. She was on a voyage from Sunderland, County Durham to Gallipoli, Ottoman Empire.
USS Louisiana	United States Navy	American Civil War: The screw steamer, packed with gunpowder, was deliberately blown up near Fort Fisher in an attempt to reduce the fort. The clock mechanism intended to detonate the gunpowder failed, but a fire deliberately started aboard the ship detonated it instead. The explosion had no appreciable effect on the fort.
Pride of Canada	United Kingdom	The barque foundered in the Atlantic Ocean with the loss of four of her crew. Survivors were rescued by the brig Generous. Pride of Canada was on a voyage from Bonny, Africa to Liverpool, Lancashire.
Richard and Frances	United Kingdom	The ship ran aground off Hunstanton, Norfolk. She was on a voyage from Maldon, Essex to Goole, Yorkshire. She was refloated and assisted in to King's Lynn, Norfolk.
Surinam	United Kingdom	The barque was damaged by fire at North Shields, Northumberland. The fire was extinguished with assistance from some of the crew of HMS Castor (Royal Navy).

== 25 December ==
List of shipwrecks: 25 December 1864
Ship	State	Description
Atlantic	United Kingdom	The barque struck a sunken rock off Cape de Gaspe, Spain. She put in to Almería in a leaky condition.
Elise	United Kingdom	The ship was driven ashore south of "Bugio". She was on a voyage from Stockholm, Sweden to Lisbon, Portugal. She floated off in a waterlogged condition.
Goole	United Kingdom	The sloop sprang a leak and foundered. Her crew were rescued. She was on a voyage from Gordon, Aberdeenshire to "Homebadge".
Ipswich Lass	United Kingdom	The ship collided with another vessel and sank off the coast of Spain. Her crew were rescued. She was on a voyage from Malta to São Miguel Island, Azores.
Wheatsheaf	United Kingdom	The sloop ran aground on the Sow and Pigs Rocks, off the coast of Northumberland. She was on a voyage from Sunderland, County Durham to Grangemouth, Stirlingshire. She was refloated and taken in to Blyth, Northumberland.

== 26 December ==
List of shipwrecks: 26 December 1864
Ship	State	Description
Christen	Denmark	The ship was driven ashore at Foulness, Essex, United Kingdom. Her crew survived. She was on a voyage from Aalborg to London, United Kingdom. She was refloated on 31 December and taken in to Brightlingsea, Essex.
Else	Sweden	The ship was driven ashore on Bugio Island, Portugal. She was on a voyage from Stockholm to Lisbon, Portugal. She floated off the next day and came ashore 9 nautical miles (17 km) north of "Linas", Portugal in late December or early January 1865.
Frederico Tagliava	Trieste	The ship was driven ashore at Capo Colonna, Italy, She was on a voyage from Trieste to Palermo, Sicily, Italy.
Johns	United Kingdom	The ship was driven ashore at Sandown Castle, Kent. She was on a voyage from London to Trinidad.
New York	United States	The ship foundered off "Dagger Island". Her crew were rescued. She was on a voyage from Sunderland, County Durham, United Kingdom to New York.

== 27 December ==
List of shipwrecks: 27 December 1864
Ship	State	Description
Agnes E. Fry	United Kingdom	American Civil War, Union blockade: The 350-ton sidewheel paddle steamer was forced ashore about 4 nautical miles (7.4 km) from Fort Campbell, North Carolina, Confederate States of America and about 2 nautical miles (3.7 km) south east of Fort Caswell by the armed screw steamer USS Monticello (United States Navy) and was wrecked.
Botassis	United Kingdom	The steamship was driven ashore on Corfu, Greece. She was on a voyage from Sulina, Ottoman Empire to London. She was refloated the next day and taken into the city of Corfu.
Emma Louise	United Kingdom	The ship was wrecked near Torekov, Sweden. Her crew were rescued. She was on a voyage from Newcastle upon Tyne, Northumberland to Kolberg.
Mary Ann	United Kingdom	The brig was abandoned in the Atlantic Ocean. Her crew were rescued by Marquis of Bute (United Kingdom). Mary Ann was on a voyage from Pomaron, Portugal to Liverpool, Lancashire.
Sagittario	Spain	The brigantine was lost near Madeira with the loss of six of the twelve people on board. Survivors were rescued by Maria Eliza (United Kingdom).
Sea Breeze	United Kingdom	The ship was driven ashore crewless in the Gut of Canso.
Unidentified schooner	Confederate States of America	American Civil War, Union blockade: The schooner was burned after she was forced aground at Murrells Inlet, South Carolina, by the armed screw steamer USS Monticello (United States Navy).

== 28 December ==
List of shipwrecks: 28 December 1864
Ship	State	Description
Cabot	(United Kingdom of Great Britain and Ireland) British North America	The barque ran aground in the Swash Channel. She was refloated and put in to New York the next day in a leaky condition.
Cowen	United Kingdom	The brig ran aground on the Barber Sand, in the North Sea off the coast of Norfolk. She was on a voyage from South Shields, County Durham to London. She was refloated with assistance and resumed her voyage.
Dunloe	United Kingdom	The ship was driven ashore at San Stefano, Ottoman Empire.
Helen	United Kingdom	The schooner was driven ashore at Wells-next-the-Sea, Norfolk. She was on a voyage from South Shields to Great Yarmouth, Norfolk. She was refloated with assistance from the steamship Premier (United Kingdom) and resumed her voyage.
Jeune Fernand Chauvelon	France	The ship collided with the schooner Heureuse (France) and sank at Saint-Nazaire, Loire-Inférieure. She was on a voyage from Troon, Ayrshire, United Kingdom to Saint-Nazaire. She had been refloated by 12 January 1865.
Pennsylvania	United States	The steamship caught fire and was scuttled at Alexandria, Egypt. She had been refloated by 1 January 1865.
Roelfind	Bremen	The ship ran aground on the Langlutjen Sand. She was refloated but the ran aground on the Middelplatte, both in the North Sea. She was on a voyage from Grimstad, Norway to Bremen. She was refloated and completed her voyage in a leaky condition.
Unidentified sloop	Flag unknown	American Civil War, Union blockade: The sloop was forced ashore and destroyed by the gunboat USS Kanawha (United States Navy) near Caney Creek, Texas, Confederate States of America.

== 29 December ==
List of shipwrecks: 29 December 1864
Ship	State	Description
Adela	France	The schooner ran aground on the Goodwin Sands, Kent, United Kingdom. She was on a voyage from Sunderland, County Durham, United Kingdom to Bordeaux, Gironde. She was refloated.
Ben Nevis	United Kingdom	The ship foundered off Cape Lacratif, Spain. Her crew were rescued. She was on a voyage from Odesa, Russia to Queenstown, County Cork.
Crescent	United Kingdom	The ship ran aground and heeled over at Penzance, Cornwall. She was on a voyage from Liverpool, Lancashire to Newcastle upon Tyne, Northumberland.
Delphine	United States	American Civil War: The 750-ton barque, proceeding in ballast from London, United Kingdom, to Akyab, British Burma, was captured and burned in the South Pacific Ocean by the merchant raider CSS Shenandoah (Confederate States Navy).
Guy Fawkes	United Kingdom	The steamship collided with the steamship Earl of Carlisle (United Kingdom) and sank in the Clyde west of Gourock, Renfrewshire with the loss of four of the six people on board. She was on a voyage from the Tail of the Bank to the Kyles of Bute. She was refloated on 31 January 1865 and beached at Greenock, Renfrewshire.
Onward	United Kingdom	The barque was wrecked off "Cape Corna", Japan. Her crew were rescued. She was on a voyage from Yokohama to Hakodate.
Talisman	United Kingdom	American Civil War, Union blockade: The 266-gross register ton sidewheel paddle steamer, a blockade runner, sank in a storm in the Atlantic Ocean. Her crew were rescued. She was on a voyage from Wilmington, Delaware to Bermuda.

== 30 December ==
List of shipwrecks: 30 December 1864
Ship	State	Description
USS Annie	United States Navy	American Civil War, Union blockade: The schooner departed Key West, Florida, Confederate States of America, to resume blockade duties in the Gulf of Mexico along Florida's west coast off Charlotte Harbor, but was not heard from again. On 5 February 1865, the screw steamer USS Hendrick Hudson (United States Navy) found her wreck submerged in 36 feet (11 m) of water with her masts above water south of Cape Romano, Florida, apparently the victim of an explosion. No sign of her crew was found.
George V	Hanover	The ship was driven ashore at Domesnes, Norway. She had been refloated by 7 January 1865 and had resumed her voyage.
Governor	United Kingdom	The brigantine collided with the steamship John McIntyre (United Kingdom) and sank in the North Sea off the coast of Yorkshire. Her crew were rescued by a steamship. She was on a voyage from London to Dundee, Forfarshire.
Hellene	United Kingdom	The ship was wrecked near "Amdan". Her crew were rescued.
Lema	Hamburg	The ship was driven ashore on Amrum, Duchy of Holstein. She was on a voyage from Hjørring, Denmark, to Hamburg. She was refloated the next day and taken in to Wyk auf Fohr in a severely leaky condition.
USS Rattler	United States Navy	American Civil War: During a heavy gale, the paddle steamer parted her mooring cables on the Mississippi River near Grand Gulf, Mississippi, ran ashore, struck a snag and sank. She was stripped and abandoned, and Confederate forces later burned her wreck.

== 31 December ==
List of shipwrecks: 31 December 1864
Ship	State	Description
Cargey	United Kingdom	The barque sprang a leak and was abandoned in the North Sea 10 nautical miles (19 km) north east by east of the Dudgeon Lightship ( Trinity House). Her crew were rescued by the steamships Caroline and Earl of Elgin (both United Kingdom). Cargey was on a voyage from North Shields, Northumberland to Gibraltar.
Congress	United Kingdom	The ship foundered off the Dudgeon Sandbank, in the North Sea off the coast of Norfolk. Her crew were rescued, some of them by Caroline (United Kingdom).
Dart	United Kingdom	The steamship was run into by Eclipse (United Kingdom) and sank in the River Tyne .
Essex	United Kingdom	The brig ran aground and was severely damaged at Portsmouth, Hampshire. She was on a voyage from Seaham, County Durham to Portsmouth.
London	United Kingdom	The ship was driven ashore at Chéticamp, Nova Scotia, Britisn North America. She was on a voyage from Quebec City, Province of Canada, British North America to Jamaica.
Macedon	United Kingdom	The steamship was abandoned near Alfaques, Spain. She was later towed in to "San Carlo" and was subsequently taken to Genoa, Italy for repairs.
Marie Sidonie	France	The schooner was abandoned in the Atlantic Ocean north of the Isles of Scilly, United Kingdom. Her crew were rescued by a Norwegian brig. She was on a voyage from Boulogne, Pas-de-Calais to Neath, Glamorgan, United Kingdom.
Prince Albert	United Kingdom	The brig was driven ashore near "Zarra". She was on a voyage from Trieste to London. She was refloated on 2 January and resumed her voyage.
Two Friends	United Kingdom	The schooner foundered off the Old Head of Kinsale, County Cork.
Venango	United States	American Civil War: The 120-ton sternwheel paddle steamer was burned at Pilcher's Point in East Carroll Parish, Louisiana.

== Unknown date ==
List of shipwrecks: Unknown date in December 1864
Ship	State	Description
Alliance	United Kingdom	The brig ran aground on the Kentish Knock. She was refloated with assistance from Agenoria (United Kingdom).
America	United Kingdom	The ship ran aground in the Sea of Marmora. She was on a voyage from Odesa, Russia to an English port. She was refloated and found to be leaky.
USS Annie	United States Navy	American Civil War, Union blockade: The schooner departed Key West, Florida, Confederate States of America, to resume blockade duties in the Gulf of Mexico along Florida's west coast off Charlotte Harbor, but was not heard from again. Found sunk 2 weeks later off Cape Romano. On 5 February 1865, the screw steamer USS Hendrick Hudson (United States Navy) found her wreck submerged in 36 feet (11 m) of water south of Cape Romano, Florida, apparently the victim of an explosion. No sign of her crew was found.
Arctic	Russia	The barque was abandoned before 23 December. Her crew were rescued by Hannibal (United Kingdom). Arctic was on a voyage from Gamla Carleby, Sweden to London, United Kingdom. She was towed in to Grimsby, Lincolnshire, United Kingdom in a derelict condition on 25 December.
Ashmore	United Kingdom	The ship was wrecked near "Hakedado"<!Hakodate?-->. Her crew were rescued.
Baron Maydell	Flag unknown	The barque was lost near Tenedos, Ottoman Empire before 13 December. Her crew were rescued. She was on a voyage from Cardiff, Glamorgan, United Kingdom to Constantinople, Ottoman Empire.
Bertha	United Kingdom	The ship ran aground off Lormont, Gironde, France. She was on a voyage from the Clyde to Bordeaux, Gironde.
British Lady	United Kingdom	The ship was wrecked on the Hook Sand, in the Solent. She was on a voyage from Briton Ferry, Glamorgan to Southampton, Hampshire.
Buenos Ayres	France	The ship collided with Ferdinand (United Kingdom) and sank. She was on a voyage from Valparaíso, Chile to Havre de Grâce, Seine-Inférieure.
Carl Gustav	Grand Duchy of Mecklenburg-Schwerin	The ship was driven ashore and wrecked on Skagen, Denmark. She was on a voyage from Newcastle upon Tyne, Northumberland, United Kingdom to Barth.
Caroline Reed	Flag unknown	The vessel was lost in the Pacific Ocean off the West Coast of the United States somewhere between Bellingham, Washington Territory, and San Francisco, California, United States.
Circonstance	France	The brigantine foundered off Escombreras, Spain before 14 December. Her crew were rescued.
Colonel Fytche	United Kingdom	The ship was wrecked in the Hooghly River.
Continental	United States	The sidewheel paddle steamer struck the wreck of the 536-ton sidewheel paddle steamer James Montgomery (United States) and sank in the Mississippi River at Devil Island upstream of Cape Girardeau, Missouri. She later was refloated.
Countess of Roden	United Kingdom	The ship sprang a leak and was beached near Drogheda, County Louth in a sinking condition. Her crew were rescued. She was on a voyage from Carlingford, County Louth to Liverpool, Lancashire.
Cronstadt	United Kingdom	The steamship departed from Reval, Russia for Copenhagen, Denmark. No further trace, presumed foundered with the loss of all hands.
Curra	Spain	The ship was driven ashore and wrecked at the mouth of the Francolí.
Dashaway	flag unknown	The schooner was stranded on the northern coast of California at Big Flat, about 22 nautical miles (41 km) south of Cape Mendocino. By the time she was found on 3 January 1865, fourteen of those on board had died.
Denmark	United Kingdom	The ship struck a sunken rock in the Andaman Islands. She was on a voyage from Moulmein, Burma to a British port. She put in to Mauritius on 6 December in a leaky condition.
Dragoon	United Kingdom	The ship was abandoned in a sinking condition. She was on a voyage from South Shields, County Durham to Copenhagen.
Echo	United Kingdom	The ship was abandoned in the Atlantic Ocean. She was on a voyage from Quebec City, Province of Canada, British North America to Liverpool.
Elise	Grand Duchy of Oldenburg	The ship sank off Bergen, Norway.
Elizabeth	United Kingdom	The schooner sank in the Humber.
Else	Sweden	The barque was abandoned in the Atlantic Ocean before 28 December.
Esperance	Kingdom of Hanover	The barque was wrecked at Escombreras. Her crew were rescued.
Floating Light	United Kingdom	The ship foundered in the Bristol Channel on or before 8 December with the loss of all hands, between 30 and 40 people. She was on a voyage from Bombay, India to Liverpool.
George Washington	Flag unknown	The vessel was lost in the Pacific Ocean off the northern coast of California.
Grai von Brandenburg	Danzig	The ship ran aground off Agger, Denmark and was abandoned with the loss of a crew member. She was on a voyage from Newcastle upon Tyne to Copenhagen.
Gross Fürst Alexander	Prussia	The ship was driven ashore crewless near Mandal, Norway before 6 December.
Hermes	Norway	The ship was lost at Cette, Hérault, France.
Hilda	United Kingdom	The ship was driven ashore at Buenos Aires, Argentina.
Hong Kong	China	The schooner capsized in the South China Sea before 16 December.
Hydaspes	United Kingdom	The ship was wrecked in the Straits of Rhio. All on board were rescued.
James E. Hindson	United Kingdom	The ship was abandoned at sea.
Jane Lawton, or John Lowton	United Kingdom	The ship was abandoned in the North Sea in a sinking condition. She was on a voyage from Königsberg, Prussia to London.
John Parkinson	United Kingdom	The ship was wrecked on the Northern Triangles Reef. All on board were rescued. She was on a voyage from Sisal, Mexico to Belize City, British Honduras.
J. M. Chapman	United States	The schooner was lost in the Pacific Ocean during a voyage from Shoalwater Bay in Queensland to San Francisco.
Johan Georg	Prussia	The ship was wrecked near Liebau, Courland Governorate.
John Cottle	United Kingdom	The ship was destroyed by fire off the coast of Chile.
Kate L. Bruce	Confederate States of America	American Civil War: The armed steamer was sunk as a blockship in the Chattahoochee River.
Lady Combermere	United Kingdom	The ship was abandoned in the Baltic Sea. Her crew survived. She was taken in to Katthammarsvik, Gotland, Sweden in a waterlogged condition.
Lady Elgin	United Kingdom	The ship struck a rock off Amherst, Burma before 28 December and was wrecked.
Lefu	Flag unknown	The ship was abandoned in the North Sea. Her crew survived.
Les Deux Amis	France	The schooner was wrecked at Escombreras. Her crew were rescued.
Lima	Rostock	The brig ran aground on the Longsand, in the North Sea off the coast of Essex, United Kingdom. She was refloated with assistance from Wonder (United Kingdom).
Linda	(United Kingdom of Great Britain and Ireland) British North America	The ship was driven ashore and wrecked on Cape Breton Island, Nova Scotia before 24 December.
Maceden	United Kingdom	The steamship was wrecked on "Ollfeque".
Margaretha	United Kingdom	The ship was driven ashore at Tønning, Duchy of Schleswig.
Maria	Flag unknown	The ship was driven ashore crewless near Mandal before 6 December.
Marshall Pellisier	France	The ship ran aground at Kurrachee, India.
Mary Davidson	United Kingdom	The ship was wrecked at Lysekil, Sweden. She as on a voyage from Ängelholm, Sweden to London.
Mary Fanny	United Kingdom	The schooner collided with Dauntless and sank at Greenock, Renfrewshire.
Matilda D	(United Kingdom of Great Britain and Ireland) British North America	The ship was driven ashore and wrecked on Cape Breton Island before 24 December.
Matilda Hopewell	United Kingdom	The ship was driven ashore and wrecked on Cape Breton Island before 24 December.
Medea	Netherlands	The steamship foundered off Skagen.
USS Monarch	United States Army	The decommissioned sidewheel ram was sunk by ice while laid up on the Mississippi River below St. Louis, Missouri. She was refloated and was scrapped in July 1865.
North America	United States	American Civil War: During a voyage under charter to the United States Department of War, carrying 225 sick and wounded Union Army soldiers from New Orleans, Louisiana, to New York, the 1,061-ton screw steamer foundered in the Atlantic Ocean east of Georgia, Confederate States of America (31°10′N 78°40′W) on 22 or 24 December with the loss of 197 lives.
Orion	Belgium	The ship was wrecked at Lysekil. She was on a voyage from Riga, Russia to Bruges, West Flanders.
Pleiades	British Raj	The ship ran aground in the Rangabulla Channel. She was refloated and towed in to Calcutta in a leaky condition.
Prefect	United Kingdom	The ship ran aground off Saint Croix, Virgin Islands. She was on a voyage from Trinidad to Havre de Grâce. She was refloated and put in to Saint Thomas, Virgin Islands in a leaky condition.
Swordfish	United States	The brig was lost on the Toddy Rocks off Hull, Massachusetts.
Tartar	United Kingdom	The steamship was lost in the Baltic Sea.
Thetis	United Kingdom	The ship was wrecked at the mouth of the Rio Grande.
Thor	Kingdom of Hanover	The ship was wrecked 30 nautical miles (56 km) north of the mouth of the Rio Grande. Her crew were rescued. She was on a voyage from Cardiff, Glamorgan to the Rio Grande.
Tre Venner	Denmark	The brig was abandoned off the coast of Norway before 3 December. She was on a voyage from Malmö, Sweden to an English port.
Valorous	(United Kingdom of Great Britain and Ireland) British North America	The ship was driven ashore and wrecked at Gabarns, Nova Scotia. Her crew were rescued.
Vixen	United Kingdom	The ship ran aground on the Blackwater Rock, at the mouth of the Garravogue River. She was on a voyage from Ballina, County Mayo to the Clyde.
Xenophon, or Zenophante	Greece	The brig foundered on or before 20 December. Her crew were rescued. She was on a voyage from Waterford, United Kingdom to Cardiff or Swansea, Glamorgan.
