= John Lafferty =

John Laverty
- Born: June 19, 1845; County Tyrone, Ireland
- Died: November 13, 1903 (aged 58); Philadelphia, Pennsylvania, U.S.
- Burial place: Mount Moriah Cemetery, Philadelphia, Pennsylvania
- Military career
- Allegiance: United States
- Branch: United States Navy
- Rank: Fireman First Class
- Nickname: AKA John Laverty
- Units: USS Wyalusing, USS Alaska
- Conflicts: American Civil War
- Awards: Medal of Honor (2)

John Lafferty or Laverty (June 19, 1842 – November 13, 1903) was a sailor in the U.S. Navy during the American Civil War and is one of only 19 people in history to receive the Medal of Honor twice.

== Biography ==
According to his first Medal of Honor citation John Lafferty was born in June 1842 in New York City. According to the second, John Laverty was born in 1845 in County Tyrone, Ireland. He is also recorded as having been born in Dublin, Ireland in 1849.

His first award was due to his service aboard the USS Wyalusing. He participated in a plan to destroy the rebel ram CSS Albemarle in the Roanoke River, May 25, 1864. He was one of five Wyalusing crew members to be awarded the Medal of Honor for bravery during the Civil War (the others being Coal Heaver Charles Baldwin, Fireman Alexander Crawford, Coal Heaver Benjamin Lloyd, and Coxswain John W. Lloyd).

He earned his second award while serving on board the USS Alaska, a wooden hulled sloop built in 1868, at Callao Bay, Peru, September 14, 1881. During his Civil War service he enlisted as John Lafferty, and his first Medal is recorded under this name. However, when he re-enlisted in the Navy, he used John Laverty, which appears to be his real name and is used on his government-issue headstone.

Laverty died in Philadelphia, Pennsylvania on November 13, 1903, and buried in Mount Moriah Cemetery, Philadelphia, Pennsylvania, where his grave can be found in the Naval Asylum Plot.

== Medal of Honor citation ==
1st Award

Rank and organization: Fireman, U.S. Navy. Born: 1842, New York, N.Y. Accredited to: Pennsylvania. G.O. No.: 45, December 31, 1864.

Citation:

Served on board the U.S.S. Wyalusing and participated in a plan to destroy the rebel ram Albemarle in Roanoke River, 25 May 1864. Volunteering for the hazardous mission, Lafferty participated in the transfer of two torpedoes across an island swamp and then served as sentry to keep guard of clothes and arms left by other members of the party. After being rejoined by others of the party who had been discovered before the plan could be completed, Lafferty succeeded in returning to the mother ship after spending 24 hours of discomfort in the rain and swamp.

2nd Award

Rank and organization: First Class Fireman, U.S. Navy. Born: 1849, Ireland. Accredited to: California. G.O. No.: 326, October 18, 1884.

Citation:

Serving on board the U.S.S. Alaska at Callao Bay, Peru, September 14, 1881. Following the rupture of the stop-valve chamber on that vessel, Laverty hauled the fires from under the boiler.

== See also ==
- List of American Civil War Medal of Honor recipients: G–L
- List of Medal of Honor recipients in non-combat incidents
