= Charles H. Baldwin (Medal of Honor) =

US Navy soldier in the American Civil War

- Born: June 30, 1839; Smyrna, Delaware, US
- Died: January 22, 1911 (aged 71)
- Military career
- Allegiance: United States
- Branch: United States Navy
- Service years: 1864 -1865
- Rank: Coal Heaver
- Unit: USS Wyalusing
- Conflicts: American Civil War
- Awards: Medal of Honor

Charles H. Baldwin (June 30, 1839 – January 22, 1911) was an enlisted man in the United States Navy during the American Civil War. He served aboard the USS Wyalusing and received the Medal of Honor for his participation in a plan to destroy the rebel ram CSS Albemarle in Roanoke River, May 25, 1864. Fellow crewmen Alexander Crawford, John Lafferty, Benjamin Lloyd, and John W. Lloyd were also awarded the Medal of Honor for participating in the same plan. He is buried at Christ Episcopal Church in Accokeek, MD.

== Biography ==
Charles H. Baldwin was born in Delaware. He is buried in Christ Church Cemetery, Accokeek, Maryland.

== Medal of Honor citation ==
Rank and organization: Coal Heaver, U.S. Navy. Born: June 30, 1839, Delaware. Accredited to: Pennsylvania. G.O. No.: 45, December 31, 1864.

Citation:

Serving on board the U.S.S. Wyalusing and participating in a plan to destroy the rebel ram Albermarle in Roanoke River, 25 May 1864. Volunteering for the hazardous mission, C.H. Baldwin participated in the transfer of 2 torpedoes across an island swamp. Weighted by a line which was used to transfer the torpedoes, he swam the river and, when challenged by a sentry, was forced to abandon the plan after erasing its detection and before it could be carried to completion. Escaping the fire of the muskets, C.H. Baldwin spent 2 days and nights of hazardous travel without food, and finally arrived, fatigued, at the mother ship.

== Namesake ==
- The destroyer USS Baldwin is named in his honor.

== See also ==
- List of American Civil War Medal of Honor recipients: A–F

== Sources ==
- "Baldwin". Dictionary of American Naval Fighting Ships. Naval History & Heritage Command, Department of the Navy. Archived from the original on 2013-02-02.
- "Navy Medal of Honor: Civil War 1861-65". Naval History & Heritage Command, Department of the Navy. Archived from the original on February 3, 2015.
