= USS Bazely (1863) =

Patrol vessel of the United States Navy

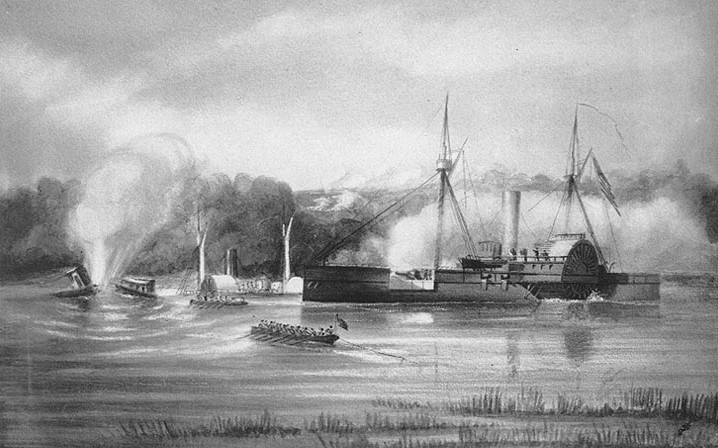
- USS Bazely (at left) striking a mine.

History

United States
- Launched: 1863
- Acquired: June 3, 1864
- Out of service: December 9, 1864
- Fate: Scuttled, December 1864

General characteristics
- Displacement: 50 tons
- Beam: 16 ft (4.9 m)
- Draft: 7 ft (2.1 m)
- Depth of hold: 6 ft 6 in (1.98 m)
- Propulsion: steam engine; screw-propelled

USS Bazely (also designated Tug No. 2 and Beta) was a steamer acquired by the Union Navy during the American Civil War. She was used by the Union Navy in a tugboat/patrol boat role in support of the Union Navy blockade of Confederate waterways.

== Service history ==
J. E. Bazely—a screw tug built in 1863 at Gloucester, New Jersey—was one of six similar vessels purchased at Philadelphia, Pennsylvania, by the U.S. Navy on June 3, 1864 to support other Union warships in all the varied ways in which tugs assist larger ships. These vessels were also needed to help protect Northern men of war and Union Army transports against surprise attacks by Confederate rams, torpedo boats, or other novel craft which had been a cause of great concern since CSS Virginia's first foray on March 8, 1862. The submersible H. L. Hunley's sinking of the screw sloop of war Housatonic and the ironclad ram Albemarle's destruction of the side wheel gunboat Southfield later underscored the dangers posed by such innovative Southern vessels. When the U.S. Navy Department designated these tugs as patrol boats, J. E. Bazely became Patrol Boat No. 2. Her sister tugs lost their merchant names; and, thereafter, each was referred to by her new designation. In practice, however, for some reason Patrol Boat No. 2 continued to carry a shortened version of her former name, Bazely.

All six tugs were assigned to the North Atlantic Blockading Squadron; and, although Bazely first appeared on its list of vessels on June 17, she did not reach Hampton Roads, Virginia, until late in July. Commanded by Acting Ensign John Conner, the tug was assigned to the North Carolina Sounds. Towed by side wheel steamer Nansemond, she and Belle got underway for Hatteras Inlet on the 27th; and the trio, along with sister tugs Hoyt and Martin who had been pulled by Monticello, entered the inland waters on the 29th. Bazely began operations in Albemarle Sound supporting the Union light draft warships which were guarding the mouth of the Roanoke River lest Albemarle reemerge and attempt to destroy the Union forces which were struggling to maintain a tenuous control on the area.

After Conner fell ill in mid August, Acting Master's Mate John Woodman, detached from Ceres, relieved him in command of Bazely that had since added Tug No. 2 to her list of names. Well into the autumn, most of the tug's attention—and that of the other warships within the sounds—was concentrated upon the Confederate ironclad. Then, suddenly, on the night of October 27, Lt. William B. Cushing put an end to that menace by his courageous ascent of the Roanoke River in Picket Launch No. 1 to destroy Albemarle by exploding a spar torpedo against her hull. His daring feat freed Union naval forces in the sounds to undertake operations that would strengthen their hold on North Carolina and cleared the way for Bazely's most notable achievement, her participation in the Union expedition that recaptured Plymouth, North Carolina. Before the attack upon that Southern position, Comdr. William H. Macomb, the senior naval officer in the sounds, had a tug lashed to each of the principal warships to assure her propulsion in the event her own engine became disabled. Bazely was tied to Shamrock; and her new commanding officer, Acting Ensign Mark D. Ames, was praised for working and fighting his ship admirably and was recommended for promotion. Besides taking the town, the expedition captured "22 cannon, 200 stand of arms, 37 prisoners, and all the enemy's flags."

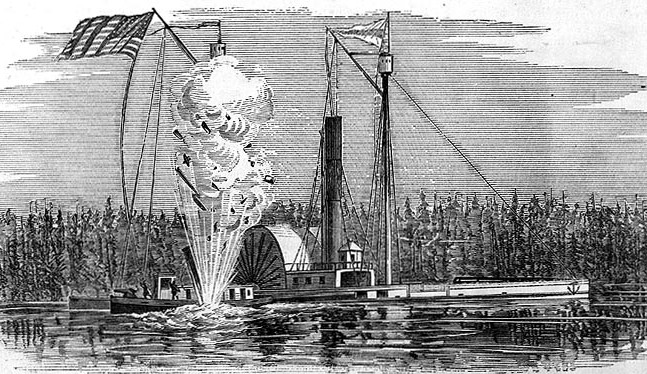
USS Bazely strikes a mine.

About the time Bazely and her sister tugs -- Picket Boat No. 1 through Picket Boat No. 6—joined the North Atlantic Blockading Squadron, and six somewhat smaller craft also appeared on the squadron's list of vessels under similar names: Picket Launch No. 1 through Picket Launch No. 6. The profound confusion that resulted from this likeness in nomenclature prompted the Navy sometime between November 1 and December 5, 1864, to rename the former J. E. Bazely and her sisters for the first six letters of the Greek alphabet Alpha through Zeta. Thus Picket Boat No. 2, alias Bazely and Tug No. 2, became Beta. Nevertheless, she did not get the opportunity to carry this new name for long, if at all. More weighty matters than name changes seemed to be occupying the leaders of the Navy in the North Carolina sounds. Besides consolidating the Union position in the wake of Albemarle's destruction, Comdr. Macomb, the senior naval officer in the area, felt concern over the report of another Confederate ironclad rumored under construction up the Roanoke River at Halifax, North Carolina.

On the afternoon of December 9, an expedition under his command started to move farther up the Roanoke from Plymouth to capture Rainbow Bluff and to destroy the reported ram. That evening, however, the double-ender Otsego struck two torpedoes near Jamesville, North Carolina, and sank. Beta—still called Bazely in Macomb's report—headed for Otsego to lend assistance, but herself struck a torpedo (mine) whose explosion killed two men and caused the tug to sink. The surviving ships of the expedition continued upstream, but the necessity of dragging for torpedoes (mines) slowed their progress, a delay that allowed the Southerners to reinforce Rainbow Bluff. Since Union troops—who were scheduled to cooperate with the gunboats—did not arrive to support the attack, Macomb decided on December 20 to withdraw his ships. They arrived back at Jamesville on Christmas Day and carried out the task of destroying Beta—which they still called Bazely—lest she fall into Confederate hands.
