= Alexander Crawford (sailor) =

Alexander S. Crawford
- Born: 1842; Philadelphia, Pennsylvania
- Died: March 17, 1886 (aged 43–44); Philadelphia, Pennsylvania
- Burial place: Cedar Hill Cemetery, Philadelphia, Pennsylvania
- Military career
- Allegiance: United States of America (Union)
- Branch: United States Navy
- Rank: Fireman
- Unit: USS Wyalusing
- Conflicts: American Civil War
- Awards: Medal of Honor

Alexander S. Crawford (1842 – March 17, 1886) was a sailor in the United States Navy who served in the American Civil War. He received the Medal of Honor for his actions during the war.

== Formative years ==
Crawford was born in 1842 (alternate birth year 1843) in Philadelphia, Pennsylvania.

== Civil War ==
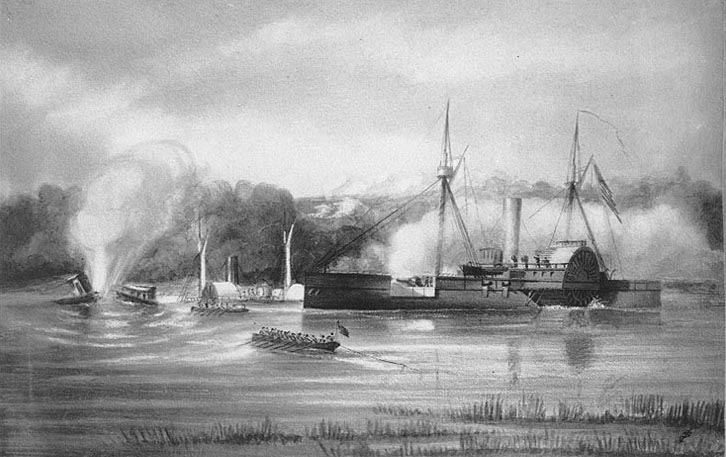
USS Wyalusing provides covering fire for boats dragging the Roanoke River for mines, December 9, 1864.

Crawford enlisted for Civil War military service with the U.S. Navy in Philadelphia in 1862. He subsequently served as a fireman on the USS Wyalusing. Having initially served 16 months during the war's early years, he re-enlisted at the rank of fireman, second class in the U.S. Navy in Philadelphia in February 1864. Military records at the time described him as being a 22-year-old native of Philadelphia and "Saw Grinder" who was 5' 7-1/2" tall with brown hair and blue eyes.

Assigned with his Wyalusing shipmates to the North Atlantic Blockading Squadron, Crawford and his fellow crewmen joined the U.S. Navy's forces which were stationed in Albemarle Sound, North Carolina, beginning on April 29, 1864. On May 5, the Wyalusing first engaged the Albemarle, a Confederate States Navy warship which had previously rammed two Union Navy ships and caused havoc for federal land and sea forces along the Roanoke River. As the Union Navy gunboats Mattabesset, Sassacus, Whitehead, and Wyalusing formed a line of battle that afternoon, they were supported by the Miami, Ceres and Commodore Hull. When the Albemarle appeared, the Mattabesset, Whitehead and Wyalusing immediately opened fire. The Wyalusing then rounded the Albemarle, but kept its distance from 150 yards away as it repositioned itself to attack the Confederate Navy's Bombshell. When the Wyalusing's crew realized that the Bombshell had already surrendered, they renewed their attack on the Albemarle. Although the fight was an intense one, it was brought to a close by darkness, enabling the Albemarle to escape along the Roanoke River. The Wyalusing's crew then resumed their blockade duties in North Carolina's Albemarle Sound region.

On May 25, 1864, while the Wyalusing was sailing the Roanoke River, Crawford and fellow crewmembers Charles H. Baldwin, John Lafferty, Benjamin Lloyd, and John W. Lloyd volunteered for a mission to destroy the Confederate ironclad CSS Albemarle. The mission failed, but the men evaded capture and eventually made it back to the Wyalusing. For their actions, the five men were each awarded the U.S. Medal of Honor.

In addition, Crawford was recognized for his valor by the U.S. Navy via General Order No. 45, which was issued on December 31, 1864:

Fireman on board of the U.S.S. Wyalusing; volunteered May 25, 1864, in a night attempt to destroy the rebel ram Albemarle, in Roanoke River, and, although it was unsuccessful, he displayed courage, zeal, and unwearied exertion on the occasion.

In his report on the incident, Captain Melancton Smith of the U.S.S. Mattabesset, wrote the following from Albemarle Sound, North Carolina, on May 30, 1864:

SIR: I have to report that an effort was made on the 25th instant at 11 o’clock by five volunteers from the steamer Wyalusing to destroy the ironclad Albemarle.

The party left at 2 o’clock p.m. of the 25th (having made a reconnaissance two days before) and ascended the Middle River in the Mattabesett’s dingey with two torpedoes, each containing 100 pounds of powder and their appendages, which they transported on a stretcher across the island swamp. Charles Baldwin, coal heaver, and John W. Lloyd, coxswain, then swam the Roanoke River with a line and hauled the torpedoes over to the Plymouth shore above the town. They were then connected by a bridle, floated down with the current, and guided by Charles Baldwin, who designed to place them across the bows of the ram, one on either side, and Alexander Crawford, who was stationed on the opposite side of the river in the swamp, was to explode them upon a given signal.

Everything had worked favorably from the time of starting until the torpedoes were within a few yards of the ram, when Baldwin was discovered and hailed by a sentry on the wharf. Two shots were then fired and a volley of musketry followed, which induced John W. Lloyd, who heard the challenge and report of small arms, to cut the guiding line, throw away the coil, and swim the river again to join John Laverty, who was left in charge of his clothes and arms.

These two men, with the boat keeper, Benjamin Lloyd, returned to the ship the morning of the 27th, after an absence of thirty-eight hours in the swamp, encountering the additional discomfort of a rainy day and night.

Two days’ unsuccessful search was made for Baldwin and Crawford, both of whom made their appearance on Sunday, the 29th instant, much fatigued by travel and somewhat exhausted from the loss of food. No traces of their intended designs were left behind them.

I can not [sic] too highly commend this party for their courage, zeal, and unwearied exertion in carrying out a project that had for sometime [sic] been under consideration. The plan of executing it was their own, except in some minor details, and although defeated in their purpose (by accidentally fouling a schooner), I deem it my imperative duty to recommend that Alexander Crawford, fireman, and Charles Baldwin, coal heaver, be promoted to a higher grade, and that all receive the pecuniary reward awarded by act of Congress for distinguished services.

Four deserters from the rebel ram Albemarle were brought off by the picket boat yesterday, but can not, without detaining the army boat, communicate the intelligence they bring. They state, however, that the Neuse is afloat and in all respects ready for service.

Very respectfully, your obedient servant,
MELANCTON SMITH,
Captain and Senior Officer in Sounds of North Carolina

Abstract Log of the U.S.S. Wyalusing
May 6, 1864.—At 11:30 a.m. John W. Lloyd, coxswain; Charles Baldwin, coal heaver; Alexander Crawford, second-class fireman; John Laverty, first-class fireman; Benjamin Lloyd, second-class fireman, went on an expedition to destroy the ram.
May 28.—At 9 a.m. all the expedition returned but two men, Baldwin and Crawford.

May 29.—At 8 p.m. the Commodore Barney came alongside and brought Alexander Crawford and Charles Baldwin from the expedition of the 26th.

Afterward, the Wyalusing remained in the area. Following the Albemarle's destruction by Union troops in late October, the Wyalusing moved with other Union gunboats up the Roanoke toward Plymouth, crossed over to Middle River, steamed to another crossover point, and then steamed back down toward Plymouth where, the next day, they exchanged fire with Confederate artillery batteries and rifle pits on shore. After the Union Navy dislodged the shore-based Confederate troops, a Wyalusing landing party then captured Fort Williams and assisted in capturing Plymouth.

On December 9, the Wyalusing and other Union Navy ships attempted to capture the Rainbow Bluff but were forced to withdraw when several Union ships were damaged by Confederate torpedoes en route. The Wyalusing then resumed blockade and amphibious duties around Plymouth late that month. On January 9, 1865, the Wyalusing's crew captured the schooner Triumph at the mouth of the Perquimans River, helped remove torpedoes from the sound and its related rivers and streams, and captured a Confederate schooner, remaining near Albemarle Sound and Cape Hatteras until mid-May 1865 when they sailed for home. Arriving in New York City on May 21, they were then honorably discharged.

== Post-war life ==
Suffering from chronic pneumonia, Crawford died in Philadelphia on March 17, 1886, and was buried in that city's Cedar Hill Cemetery on March 24. He was 43 at the time of his death, and had been employed as a saloon keeper, according to his death certificate.

== Medal of Honor citation ==
According to the U.S. Army Center of Military History, Alexander Crawford's official Medal of Honor citation reads as follows:

On board the U.S.S. Wyalusing, Crawford volunteered May 25, 1864, in a night attempt to destroy the rebel ram Albemarle in the Roanoke River. Taking part in a plan to explode the rebel ram Albemarle, Crawford executed his part in the plan with perfection, but upon being discovered, was forced to abandon the plan and retire leaving no trace of the evidence. After spending two hazardous days and nights without food, he gained the safety of a friendly ship and was then transferred back to the Wyalusing. Though the plan failed his skill and courage in preventing detection were an example of unfailing devotion to duty.

== See also ==
- List of Medal of Honor recipients
- List of American Civil War Medal of Honor recipients: A–F
- Pennsylvania in the American Civil War
