= John P. Bankhead =

US Navy Civil War officer (1821–1867)

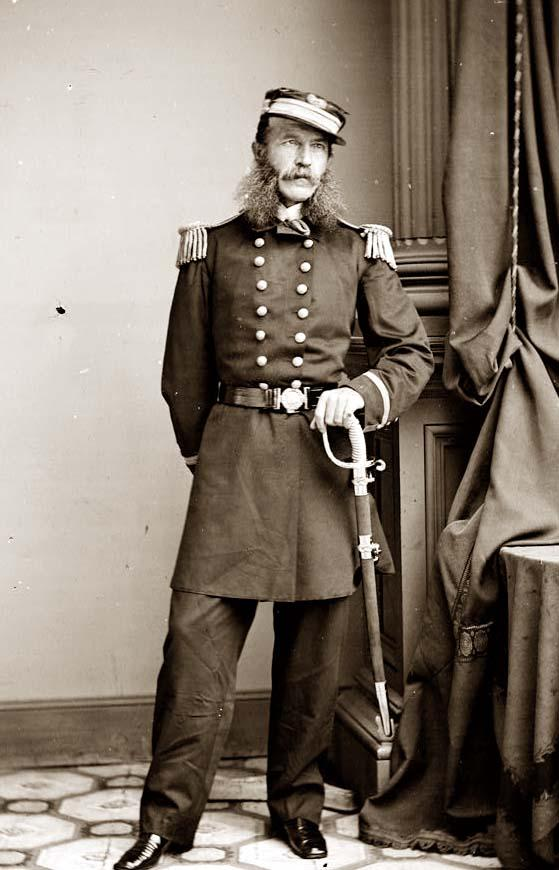
- Commander John P. Bankhead
- Born: August 3, 1821; Fort Johnson, James Island (South Carolina)
- Died: April 27, 1867 (aged 45); On board the steamer Simla at the Port of Aden (Yemen)
- Burial place: At Sea
- Military career
- Allegiance: United States; Union
- Branch: United States Navy; Union Navy
- Service years: 1838–1867
- Rank: Captain
- Nickname: J.P.
- Commands: USS Monitor; USS Florida; USS Otsego; USS Wyoming
- Conflicts: Mexican–American War; American Civil War

John Pyne Bankhead (1821–1867) was an officer in the United States Navy who served during the American Civil War, and was in command of the ironclad USS Monitor when it sank in 1862. He went on to command three other ships.

== Early life ==
John Payne Bankhead was born on August 3, 1821, at Fort Johnson on James Island, South Carolina. His father was General James Bankhead, a brigadier general who distinguished himself in the Mexican–American War. His mother was Ann Smith Pyne. Bankhead's family were prominent citizens from both Virginia and South Carolina. As the Civil War approached secession badly divided his family as it did with so many others in these states. Bankhead's two brothers, Henry C., a regular army officer who also sided with the Union and Smith Pyne, a lawyer in Memphis, Tennessee, who joined the Confederate army became a colonel. Major General John Bankhead Magruder was a cousin who left the Union and served under the Confederate flag.

== Military career ==
Bankhead entered the navy in August 1838 at the age of 17. His first ship was the frigate Macedonian, and his early career was spent with the United States Coast Survey in the Carolinas. He was promoted to passed midshipman on 20 May 1844. While in Vera Cruz during the Mexican–American War, Bankhead served under his father. He was later promoted to master on 8 May 1851 and lieutenant on 7 April 1852.

After the Confederates fired on Fort Sumter and President Lincoln's declaration of a blockade, Bankhead was ordered to USS Susquehanna, (Note: Also spelled as Susquahanna) a side-wheel steamer carrying fifteen guns launched in 1850. In August Susquahanna participated in the joint army-navy expedition to Cape Hatteras, North Carolina. On August 28 the Union naval force, including Susquahanna, bombarded the forts guarding Hatteras Inlet as troops landed. The following day the bombardment continued until the forts finally surrendered. Bankhead criticized the way the attacks were carried out and later wrote Captain Gustavus Fox, the Assistant Secretary of the Navy and an old shipmate, that the forts could have been taken in much less time:

Had a boat been sent in to take soundings and a few buoys placed at the commencement of shoal waters,
the squadron could have gone in close and finished the whole matter up in a few hours instead of two days
and saved to the Government money, tons of shot and shell which were literally thrown away...

Bankhead was later stationed on Pembina and was sent to Charleston, South Carolina, for blockade duty, where his years with the U.S. Coast Survey were put to good use.

On May 15 Bankhead was assigned to USS Pembina and which was ordered to join the blockading force off Charleston. Pembina was assigned to this important blockading station because of her shallow draft, which was necessary for this inshore duty.

On May 16 Pembina arrived off Charleston and Bankhead was ordered by the senior officer present, Commander John B. Marchand, to determine if the water over the bar at the entrance to the Stono River was deep enough to allow his warships to cross over.

Throughout the summer of 1862, Bankhead remained on blockade duty near Charleston. Bankhead was promoted to commander on July 16, 1862, and in the middle of August Pembina was ordered to New York for repairs. Flag Officer DuPont wrote a letter on Bankhead's behalf to Captain Gustavus Fox, Assistant Secretary of the Navy, requesting that he be transferred to an ironclad vessel. Bankhead was given Monitor and took command from Thomas Stevens on September 10, 1862.

=== Command of USS Monitor ===
Bankhead was sent to New York in the beginning of September with Pembina for needed repairs to the vessel. He was recommended by Flag Officer DuPont for command of Monitor to which Secretary Fox complied. Upon arriving in New York, Bankhead received orders to take command of Monitor. He was then sent to Hampton Roads and upon arrival relieved Commander Stevens on September 10. Shortly after the change of command, a board of survey condemned the ironclad's engines and boilers and recommended that they be extensively overhauled and on October 3, 1862, the ironclad arrived at the Washington Navy Yard for repairs. For approximately six weeks the vessel remained in Washington's Navy yard while her bottom was scraped clean of barnacles and other sea foul while the engines and boilers were overhauled and the entire vessel cleaned and painted, and a number of improvements made, including an iron shield around the top of the turret. She was taken out of drydock on October 26. By November the ship was fully repaired and outfitted and ready to return to service at Hampton Roads.

Orders were issued on December 24, 1862, for Monitor to move to Beaufort, North Carolina, to join USS Passaic and USS Montauk. There the ship would join the blockade off Charleston. On Christmas Day Monitor was ready for sea, but because of stormy weather and rough seas the departure was delayed until 29 December. The actual orders were received on Christmas Day as the crew were celebrating the holiday aboard Monitor at Hampton Roads in what was described as a most merry fashion while many other celebrations were occurring along the shore. Bankhead paid the ship's cook one dollar to prepare a meal for the crew befitting the day, however it was received with mixed opinion.

That day, Monitor was made ready for sea, her crew under strict orders not to discuss the impending voyage with anyone. but bad weather delayed her departure until 29 December. While the design of Monitor was well-suited for river combat, her low freeboard and heavy turret made her highly unseaworthy in rough waters. Monitor put to sea on December 31, under tow from Rhode Island, when a heavy storm developed off Cape Hatteras, North Carolina. Using chalk and a blackboard, Bankhead wrote messages alerting Rhode Island that if Monitor needed help she would signal with a red lantern.

On December 31, 1862, a storm hit seas off Cape Hatteras, and Monitor, under tow by Rhode Island. Monitor was soon in trouble as the storm increased in ferocity, large waves splashing over and completely covering the deck, flooding into the vents and ports. She began rolling uncontrollably in the high seas. Sometimes she would drop into a wave with such force the entire hull would tremble. Leaks were beginning to appear everywhere. Bankhead ordered the engineers to start the Worthington pumps, which temporarily stemmed the rising waters, but soon Monitor was hit by a squall and a series of violent waves and water continued to work its way into the hull. When the Worthington pump could no longer control the flooding, a call came from the engine room that water was gaining there. Realizing the ship was in serious trouble, Bankhead signaled Rhode Island for help and hoisted the red lantern next to Monitor's white running light atop the turret. He then called for volunteers and ordered the towline cut and the anchor dropped to stop the ship's rolling and pitching, with little effect, making it no easier for the rescue boats to get close enough to receive her crew. Acting Master Stodder, along with crewmates John Stocking, and James Fenwick volunteered and climbed down from the turret, but eyewitnesses said that as soon as they were on the deck Fenwick and Stocking were quickly swept overboard and drowned. Stodder managed to hang onto the safety lines around the deck and finally cut through the 13 in (33 cm) towline with a hatchet. At 11:30 p.m. Bankhead ordered the engineers to stop engines and divert all available steam to the large Adams centrifugal steam pump; but with reduced steam output from a boiler being fed wet coal it too was unable to stem the rapidly rising water. After all steam pumps had failed, Bankhead ordered some of the crew to man the hand pumps and organized a bucket brigade, but to no avail.

Despite a prolonged and desperate rescue effort, Monitor was finally overwhelmed, foundered and sank approximately 16 miles (26 km) southeast off Cape Hatteras with the loss of sixteen men, including four officers, some of whom remained in the turret and went down with the ironclad. A total of forty-seven men were rescued by the life boats from Rhode Island. (Note: William Keeler in Annual Report of the Secretary of the Navy, (Washington: D.C.: Government Printing Office, 1863)) Bankhead survived the ordeal and was the last man to abandon the ship, but suffered from exposure. After his initial recovery, Bankhead filed his official report, as did the commanding officers of the Rhode Island, stating officers and men of both Monitor and Rhode Island did everything within their ability to keep Monitor from sinking. The Navy did not find it necessary to commission a board of inquiry to investigate the affair and took no action against Bankhead or any of his officers.

=== Command of USS Otsego ===
After surviving the ordeal with the loss of Monitor during the fall and early winter months of 1863–1864, Bankhead recovered slowly. He finally requested active duty in January 1864 and on February 3 was given command of the new double ender side-wheel gunboat USS Otsego. The ship was commissioned in the spring and reached Hampton Roads by 24 May 1864. Otsego was assigned to the North Atlantic Blockading Squadron with her station to be the North Carolina sounds. On June 21 Bankhead was given command of Union naval forces in the sounds. His major responsibility was capturing or destroying the Confederate ironclad ram CSS Albemarle up the Roanoke River. In April Confederate troops assisted by Albemarle had seized and were now occupying Plymouth, North Carolina, a few miles up the Roanoke. On 5 May Albemarle descended the river and attacked Union gunboats in the sound in an engagement that lasted nearly three hours. The Confederate vessel, badly damaged and in need of repairs, returned to Plymouth. Throughout the summer months it was feared that she would again attempt to enter the sounds and Bankhead, with Otsego and four additional gunboats, guarded the river's mouth. Sometime in the late summer he was detached from Otsego, probably because of poor health.

=== Command of USS Wyoming ===
USS Wyoming was transferred to the Asiatic Squadron, and Bankhead was promoted to captain on 25 July 1866 and remained in command until 1867, when due to poor health he requested to be relieved of duty. He died on April 27, 1867, off Aden on the Bengal steamer Simla, on his way home to the United States. Bankhead ended the war still in command of Wyoming, which was stationed in the Pacific searching for CSS Shenandoah

== See also ==
- Union Navy
- Confederate States Navy

== Bibliography ==
- "John Payne Bankhead". Newport News, VA: The Mariner's Museum. 2013. Archived from the original on 2013-06-01.
- Quarstein, John V. Quarstein (2010). The Monitor Boys: The Crew of the Union's First Ironclad. The History Press. p. 349. ISBN 9781596294554.
- Still, William N. (1988). Hill, Dina B. (ed.). Ironclad Captains: The Commanding Officers of the U. S. S. Monitor. Washington, D.C.: National Oceanic and Atmospheric Administration, U.S. Government Printing Office. p. 83. ISBN 9780160035609.

=== Further reading ===
- "Bankhead, John Pine". The Biographical Dictionary of America. Vol. 1. 1906. pp. 205–206.
- Bibliography of American Civil War naval history
