= USS Wyalusing =

Gunboat of the United States Navy

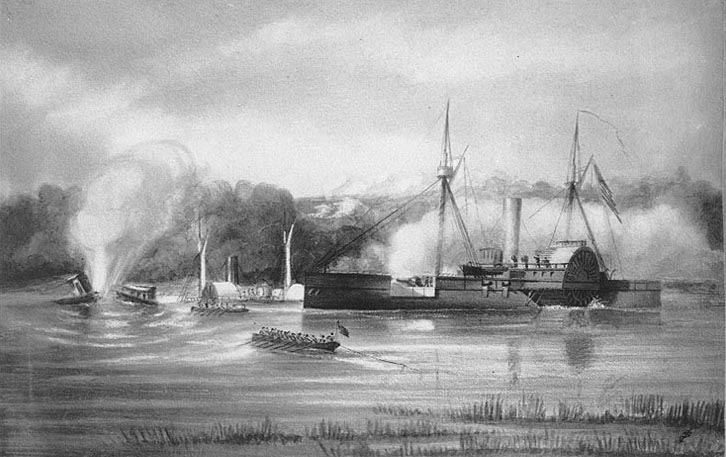
- USS Wyalusing coming to the aid of USS Otsego and USS Bazely on the Roanoke River, 9 December 1864

History

Union Navy Jack
- Name: USS Wyalusing
- Builder: William Cramp & Sons, Philadelphia
- Yard number: 113
- Launched: 12 May 1863
- Commissioned: 8 February 1864
- Decommissioned: 10 June 1865
- Fate: Sold, 15 October 1867

General characteristics
- Class & type: Sassacus-class gunboat
- Displacement: 1,173 long tons (1,192 t)
- Length: 205 ft (62 m)
- Beam: 35 ft (11 m)
- Draft: 9 ft (2.7 m)
- Propulsion: Steam engine
- Speed: 14 knots (26 km/h; 16 mph)
- Complement: 154 officers and men
- Armament: 2 × 100-pounder Parrott rifles; 4 × 9 in (230 mm) smoothbore Dahlgren gun; 4 × 24-pounder howitzers; 2 × 9-pounder rifled gun; 2 × heavy 12-pounder smoothbore guns

USS Wyalusing was a double-ended, side-wheel gunboat that served in the United States Navy during the American Civil War. She was named for the borough of Wyalusing in Bradford County, Pennsylvania.

Wyalusing was built at Philadelphia by C. H. & W. H. Cramp, launched on 12 May 1863, and commissioned at the Philadelphia Navy Yard on 8 February 1864, with Lieutenant Commander Walter W. Queen in command.

== Service history ==
=== Battle with Albemarle, 5 May 1864 ===
Assigned to the North Atlantic Blockading Squadron, Wyalusing joined the contingent of that force stationed in Albemarle Sound, North Carolina on 29 April. Just 10 days before her arrival, the Confederate ironclad ram CSS Albemarle had made her long-awaited appearance in battle, ramming two of the blockading Union gunboats in the process. As a result of her support, Confederate land forces recaptured Plymouth, North Carolina on 20 April. Wyalusing had her first scrape with the formidable Confederate warship on 5 May. Albemarle steamed out of her haven on the Roanoke River that afternoon accompanied by steamers CSS Bombshell and CSS Cotton Plant to try to wreak more havoc on the blockaders. The Union picket boats stationed at the mouth of the Roanoke retired to raise the alarm. Gunboats Mattabesett, Sassacus, Whitehead and Wyalusing immediately formed a line of battle supported by Miami, Commodore Hull and Ceres.

When the Southern ram appeared, Mattabesset, Whitehead and Wyalusing opened fire almost simultaneously. Wyalusing passed Albemarle at about 150 yards distance, rounded her, and headed to attack Bombshell. The latter Confederate, however, had already surrendered, so Wyalusing backed clear of her and renewed the attack on the more formidable foe, Albemarle. A heavy, but inconclusive, gun action ensued. Impending darkness brought the fighting to a close, and Albemarle headed back up the Roanoke.

=== Raid on Albemarle, 26 May 1864 ===
Wyalusing and her consorts resumed blockade station in the sound, but all efforts were made over the next five months to destroy the Confederate ironclad. The first of those missions was concocted and attempted by five Wyalusing sailors on 26 May. They rowed up Middle River that afternoon carrying two 100-pound torpedoes, and then carried them by stretcher across the swampland separating the Middle and Roanoke Rivers to a point just above and opposite Albemarle's mooring place at Plymouth. Two of the sailors then swam across the river with a towline attached to the explosive devices and then hauled them across. The torpedoes were then joined by a bridle, and one of the sailors guided them down toward the ram hoping to place the bridle across her prow with a torpedo making contact with either side of her hull. He was then to swim clear before another man stationed across the river detonated the torpedoes electrically. The Confederates caught sight of both swimmer and torpedoes when they were just a few yards short of their goal. A hail of musketry from the shore followed soon after a sentry's hail. The swimmer quickly cut the guide line, retired, and then swam back across the river. The five Union sailors scattered. Three returned to Wyalusing on the evening of 28 May. The remaining two rejoined their ship the following night after rescue by Commodore Hull. The five men, Coxswain John W. Lloyd, Coal Heavers Charles H. Baldwin and Benjamin Lloyd, and Firemen Alexander Crawford and John Laverty, ultimately received the Medal of Honor for their attempt.

=== Destruction of Albemarle, 28 October 1864 ===
During the ensuing months, while Wyalusing remained on station in the sound, more unsuccessful plans to destroy the Confederate ram were developed. It was not until the night of 27 October—28 that Lieutenant William B. Cushing accomplished Albemarle's destruction in a steam launch outfitted with a spar torpedo. That event opened the way for the recapture of Plymouth and for further offensive action on the Roanoke and Middle Rivers.

=== Recapture of Plymouth ===
On 29 October, Wyalusing, in company with other gunboats, steamed up the Roanoke toward Plymouth; but, just below the objective, impassable barriers barred the way. Undaunted, the warships crossed over to Middle River, journeyed to another crossover point above Plymouth, and then steamed downriver toward the goal. The next day, the gunboats exchanged shot and shell with Confederate shore batteries and rifle pits protecting Plymouth. The Confederates fought stubbornly, but the heavy-caliber Union cannonade eventually prevailed and forced the Southerners to abandon their fortifications. A landing party from Wyalusing took possession of Fort Williams, captured prisoners, and helped to retake Plymouth.

=== Rainbow Bluff expedition, December 1864 ===
On 9 December, an expedition, of which Wyalusing was a part, moved farther up the Roanoke to capture Rainbow Bluff and another Confederate ram, rumored to be under construction at Halifax, North Carolina. While anchoring near Jamesville, North Carolina, Otsego, another gunboat, struck two torpedoes (mines) and sank up to her gun deck. Bazely, a tug, moved alongside Otsego to offer assistance, but she, too, struck a torpedo and sank immediately. Wyalusing and the remainder of the expedition left the two partially sunken ships under the protection of their own unsubmerged guns and headed upriver, cautiously dragging for torpedoes as they went. By the time they had reached the point of attack, the Confederate positions at Rainbow Bluff had been so well reinforced and the approaches so heavily strewn with torpedoes that the Union ships had to abandon the enterprise. Wyalusing and her consorts returned to Plymouth on 28 December 1864 and resumed blockade and amphibious support duties.

=== End of the Civil War ===
On 9 January 1865, she captured the schooner Triumph, laden with salt, at the mouth of the Perquimans River. She also helped to clear the various rivers and streams along the sound of obstructions and torpedoes and managed to capture a Confederate schooner in the process. She continued duty in the Albemarle Sound and Cape Hatteras areas until a month after General Robert E. Lee's surrender at Appomattox, Virginia on 9 April. She arrived in New York on 21 May and was decommissioned there on 10 June 1865. Later transferred to Philadelphia, she was sold there on 15 October 1867.

As of 2005, no other ship in the United States Navy has been named Wyalusing.

== See also ==
- Union Navy
- Dictionary of American Naval Fighting Ships
