= USS Hoyt =

Torpedo boat of the United States Navy

History

United States
- Ordered: as Luke Hoyt
- Laid down: date unknown
- Launched: 1863
- Acquired: 1 July 1864
- In service: 1864
- Out of service: 1865
- Stricken: 1865 (est.)
- Fate: not known

General characteristics
- Displacement: not known
- Length: 45 ft (14 m)
- Beam: 10 ft 5 in (3.18 m)
- Draught: 4 ft 7 in (1.40 m)
- Propulsion: steam engine; screw-propelled
- Speed: 7 knots
- Complement: not known
- Armament: one spar torpedo

USS Hoyt was a steamer acquired by the Union Navy during the American Civil War. She was used by the Union Navy for various tasks, including those of a torpedo boat.

Hoyt, a former merchant tug Luke Hoyt, built at Philadelphia, Pennsylvania, in 1863, was acquired 1 July 1864.

== Fitting out as a torpedo boat ==
Hoyt and steam tugs USS Belle and USS Martin, fitted with spar torpedoes, were dispatched by Rear Admiral Samuel Phillips Lee to join Union Naval Forces in the rivers and sounds of North Carolina. These torpedo boats were intended as counter-weapons against much-feared Confederate rams rumored to be building up the Roanoke River. Admiral Lee described their armament :

This form of torpedo is intended to explode on impact, and to be placed on a pole or rod projecting not less than 15 feet, and if possible 20 feet, beyond the vessel using it. It contains 150 pounds of powder.

== North Carolina operations ==
Hoyt took station at New Berne, North Carolina, waiting for combat opportunity that never came.

== Post-war decommissioning and sale ==
She steamed north late in May 1865, and was sold 10 August 1865 at Philadelphia.

== Notes on torpedo warfare during the American Civil War ==
Hoyt was a part of the small beginning of a most serious weapon in the 20th century. The Confederacy had first pointed the way to moderate success of torpedo warfare in the Civil War when a similarly armed "David" damaged the USS New Ironsides. Union blockaders were much alarmed in February 1864 when the hand-powered submarine H. L. Hunley, armed with a spar torpedo, sank the steam sloop-of-war USS Housatonic. The importance of torpedo warfare was further underscored the night of 27–28 October 1864, when Lieutenant Cushing and a crew of 14 sank the ironclad ram CSS Albemarle with an improvised torpedo boat. These pioneers cast a shadow far ahead toward the enormous underseas combat capabilities of the 20th century.
