= USS Annie =

Gunboat of the United States Navy

History

United States
- Acquired: 11 March 1863
- In service: c. 1 April 1863
- Out of service: c. 30 December 1864
- Stricken: 1865
- Captured: 26 February 1863
- Fate: Lost 1865

General characteristics
- Displacement: 27 tons
- Length: 46 ft 2 in (14.07 m)
- Beam: 14 ft 0 in (4.27 m)
- Draft: 5 ft (1.5 m)
- Depth of hold: 4 ft 6 in (1.37 m)
- Propulsion: Sail
- Armament: One smooth-bore 12-pounder

USS Annie was a schooner captured by the Union Navy during the American Civil War. She was used by the Union Navy as a ship's tender in support of the Union Navy blockade of Confederate waterways. Her service during the Union naval blockade of Confederate waters peaked during the Second Chesapeake Affair (1863–64) as a "fresh reinforcement from the south" in the search and capture of the U.S.S Chesapeake.

== Capture ==
On the evening of 26 February 1863, armed boats commanded by acting Master Robert B. Smith from the Union sidewheel steamer USS Fort Henry captured Anna while that schooner was attempting to slip through the blockade and enter the Suwannee River with a widely varied cargo from the Bahamas. The prize's master, Captain H. Hanson, acknowledged that he was "endeavoring to run the blockade."

== Lineage ==
The report of this action does not mention that the prize had ever carried any other name. However, later records maintain that she had been called La Criala when captured and was renamed Anna at the beginning of her service in the Union Navy. A schooner called La Criolla had been captured by the Union sidewheeler USS Bienville some 25 miles (40 km) southeast of the Charleston, South Carolina, bar and, subsequently, had been condemned and sold by the Federal prize court at Philadelphia, Pennsylvania. It is possible that the purchaser of La Criolla renamed her Anna and she was the vessel captured on 26 February 1863 by Fort Henry. If so, she had been built, according to an inspecting officer from Bienville, "...in one of the Northern States in the year 1857, and was [originally] named Nora." However, evidence that this was the case is far from conclusive.

== Union Navy ==
=== East Gulf blockade ===
Anna was condemned by the Key West, Florida, prize court and the Union Navy purchased her on 11 March 1863 for service in the East Gulf Blockading Squadron. Her name first appeared on the list of vessels composing that squadron in a report dated the 16th and bore the notation, "Tender to Dole, fitting out."

By 1 April 1863, she had begun her active service and was stationed at Boca Grande. The vessel's name appeared as Annie and so it remained throughout her naval service. Almost a year later, on 8 March 1864, the squadron commanding officer, acting Rear Admiral Theodorus Bailey, explained this discrepancy to the Navy Department.

On the morning of the 13th, Annie—Acting Ensign James S. Williams in command—took her first prize, the schooner Mattie which was attempting to run into the Crystal River, Florida, with a diverse cargo. Williams placed a crew on board the prize and sent her to Key West in charge of Master's Mate Marcellus Jackson.

About half an hour before noon on 28 April, Annie sighted, chased, and fired upon Dream before that British schooner escaped into Spanish territorial waters off Cuba. This action prompted a protest by the English master and added to the already large list of incidents that kept relations between the Federal Government and the United Kingdom tense throughout the Civil War.

=== Continued operations ===
Annie scored again while proceeding to Tampa Bay on 11 July when she took the whaleboat Alice and her crew of six—from Havana—behind Cotteral's Key. Williams had been informed of the presence of the boat by the keeper of the Northwest Channel lighthouse who feared that she might attack his outpost. Another prize came Annie's, way on the afternoon of 20 October when she captured the British schooner Martha Jane, outward-bound from Bayport, Florida, laden with cotton.

Ten days later, Annie joined the armed launch of the screw gunboat USS Sagamore—which she was then tending—in chasing Meteor and caught that British schooner which was attempting to slip into Bayport, with an assorted cargo from Havana. Annie and the launch again teamed up on 7 November when they took the British schooner Paul which—although cleared from Havana for Matamoras—was approaching the Florida coast with diverse merchandise.

In the second half of February 1864, Annie left Sagamore and was attached to the screw gunboat Takoma; and, thereafter, she acted as a tender to several other Union blockaders. On the morning of 2 March 1864, Annie anchored at 9:00 a.m., some five miles from land. Two hours later, a lookout reported having sighted a small boat approaching. At noon, the boat reversed course and fled, prompting the Union warship to give chase. Thirty minutes' sailing brought her within sight of "a schooner inside the reefs" and toward which the boat was rowing.

At 1:10 p.m., Annie "anchored in 6 feet of water" and sent an armed boat to board the schooner. However, the fleeing boat reached that vessel before the Yankee sailors boarded her, set her afire, and then hurried on shoreward. At 2:00 p.m., Annie's men went on board the schooner and found her to a new vessel of about 80 tons carrying an assorted cargo which included a large amount of ammunition. The rapid spread of the flames forced them to leave the prize which exploded about three minutes after their departure.

Later that afternoon, a skiff flying a white flag came alongside Annie. Its sole passenger, a man who "identified himself as Allen A. Stephens" and reported that he was one of a group of 20 men "about to rise against the rebel government ... and requested arms for his company." After promising Allen to report the incident, they allowed him to return to land, but no further mention of this man appears in the official record.

== Loss ==
During the remainder of 1864, Annie continued to serve in the blockade of Florida's Gulf Coast. On 30 December 1864, she departed Key West and headed for Charlotte Harbor on Florida's west coast for further blockade duty. In January 1865, about two weeks after she left Key West, her hulk was found resting on the bottom in about six fathoms (36 feet; 11 meters) of water. She was a total wreck, apparently the victim of an explosion; and no trace of her crew was found.
