= USS Martin (1864) =

Tugboat of the United States Navy

History

United States
- Ordered: as James McMartin
- Laid down: date unknown
- Launched: 1864
- Acquired: 16 June 1864
- Commissioned: June 1864
- Decommissioned: 1865
- Stricken: 1865 (est.)
- Fate: Sold, 10 August 1865

General characteristics
- Displacement: 25 tons
- Length: 45 ft 3 in (13.79 m)
- Beam: 11 ft 3 in (3.43 m)
- Draft: 5 ft 9 in (1.75 m)
- Propulsion: steam engine; screw-propelled
- Speed: 6 knots
- Complement: 9
- Armament: one spar torpedo

USS Martin was a steamer acquired by the Union Navy during the American Civil War. She was used by the Union Navy for various tasks, including those of a torpedo boat, tugboat, and a picket boat, patrolling Confederate waterways to prevent the South from trading with other countries.

Martin, a screw tug built at Albany, New York, in 1864 was purchased by the Navy as James McMartin at New York City 16 June 1864; renamed Martin that same day; and commissioned later in the month.

== Assigned as a mine-layer boat for the North Atlantic Blockade ==
Equipped as a torpedo boat, on 20 July Martin was assigned to the North Atlantic Blockading Squadron for picket guard duty. On 27 July she was taken in tow along with sister tug Hoyt by screw steamer Monticello for convoy from Hampton Roads, Virginia at Hatteras Inlet, North Carolina, arriving 2 days later.

== Operations in the North Carolina waterways ==
Martin operated in the sounds of North Carolina, through 1864. On 29 September she accompanied gunboat Valley City up the Scuppernong River to head off a group of Confederate conscriptors being chased by two Union Army steamers from the vicinity of the Alligator River. With Martin’s assistance as a tug, Valley City was able to position her guns on the stragglers with telling results. Martin later joined in the operations which led to the capture of Plymouth, North Carolina, between 29 October and 1 November.

== End-of-war operations and decommissioning and sale ==
After overhaul at Norfolk Navy Yard in early 1865, Martin returned to the sounds of North Carolina, in late February. She continued tug and picket duties through May before sailing north in June, to Philadelphia, Pennsylvania, for decommissioning. Martin was sold there 10 August.
