= John W. Lloyd =

- Born: 1831; New York City, New York
- Died: Unknown
- Military career
- Allegiance: United States of America; Union
- Branch: United States Navy; Union Navy
- Rank: Coxswain
- Unit: (United States Navy) USS Wyalusing
- Conflicts: American Civil War
- Awards: Medal of Honor

John W. Lloyd was a Coxswain in the Union Navy and a Medal of Honor recipient for his actions in the American Civil War.

== Medal of Honor citation ==
Rank and organization: Coxswain, U.S. Navy. Born. 1831, New York, N.Y. Accredited to: New York. G.O. No.: 45, December 31, 1864.

Citation:

Serving on board the U.S.S. Wyalusing during an attempt to destroy the rebel ram Albemarle in Roanoke River, 25 May 1864, Lloyd participated in this daring plan by swimming the Roanoke River heavily weighted with a line which was used for hauling torpedoes across. Thwarted by discovery just before the completion of the plan, Lloyd cut the torpedo guiding line to prevent detection of the plan by the enemy and again swam the river, narrowly escaping enemy musket fire and regaining the ship in safety.

== See also ==
- List of American Civil War Medal of Honor recipients: G–L
