= USS Otsego (1863) =

Gunboat of the United States Navy

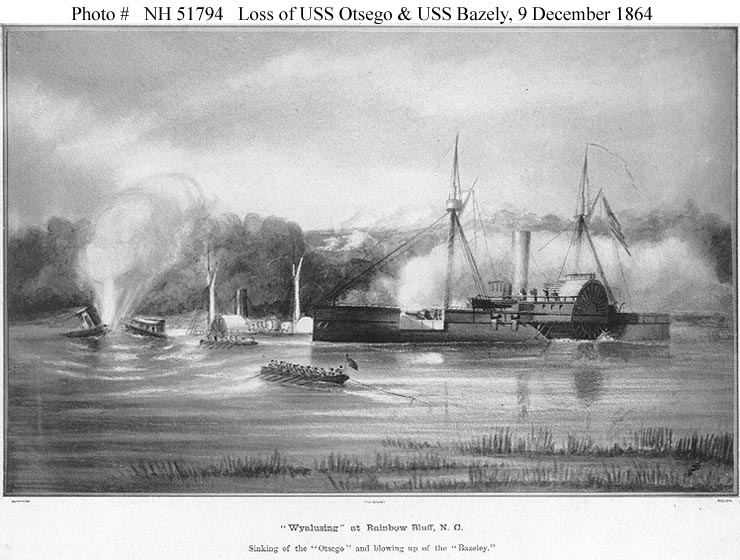

History

United States
- Name: USS Otsego
- Builder: Jacob A. & D. D. Westervelt, New York City
- Launched: 31 March 1863
- Commissioned: spring of 1864
- Fate: Sunk by mine, 9 December 1864

General characteristics
- Class & type: Sassacus-class gunboat
- Displacement: 974 tons
- Length: 205 ft 0 in (62.48 m)
- Beam: 35 ft 0 in (10.67 m)
- Draft: 9 ft 10 in (3.00 m)
- Depth of hold: 11 ft 6 in (3.51 m)
- Propulsion: steam engine; side-wheel propelled
- Speed: 14 knots (26 km/h; 16 mph)
- Complement: 145
- Armament: two 100-pounder Parrott rifles; two 20-pounder Parrott rifles; four 9" Dahlgren smoothbores; two 24-pounder guns

USS Otsego was a steamer acquired by the Union Navy during the American Civil War. She was used by the Navy to patrol navigable waterways of the Confederacy to prevent the South from trading with other countries.

== Service history ==
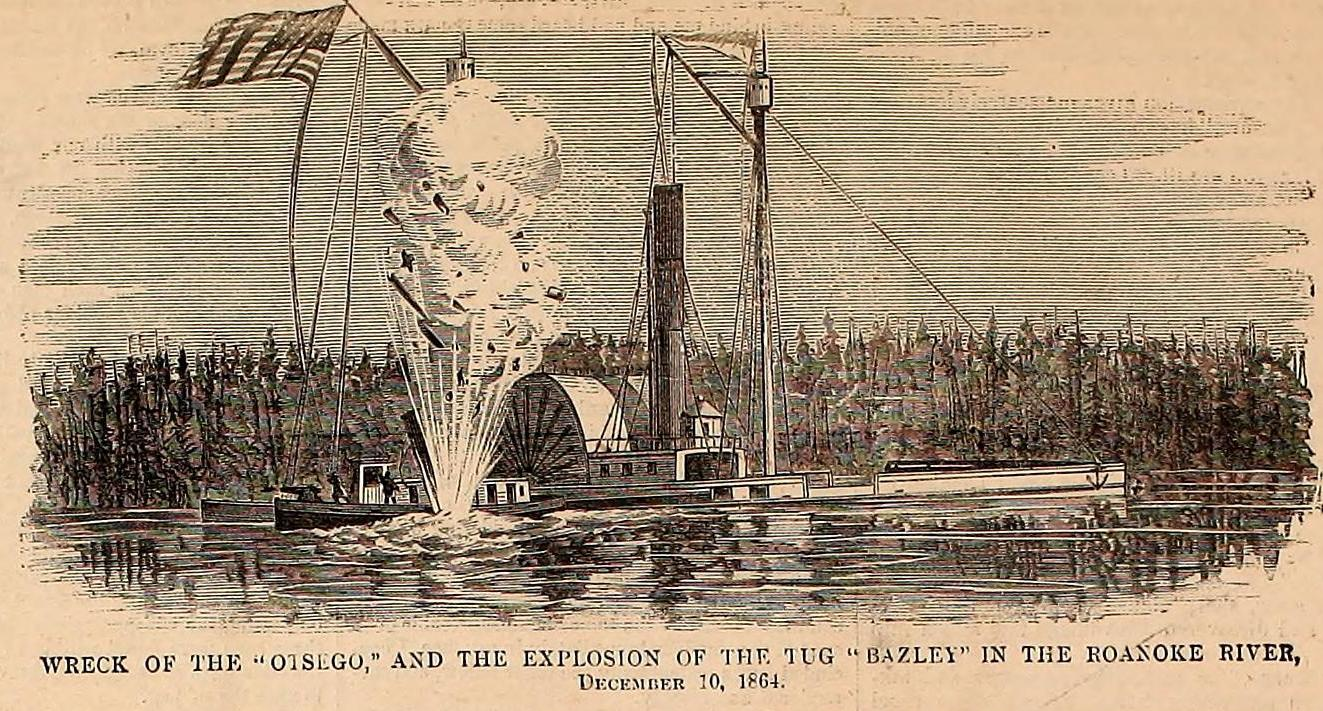
Wreck of the Otsego, and the explosion of the tug Bazley in the Roanoke River, December 10th 1864

Otsego, a wooden, double-ended, side-wheel gunboat, was launched 31 March 1863 by Jacob A. & D. D. Westervelt, New York City, New York, and apparently commissioned in the spring of 1864, Commander John P. Bankhead in command. Assigned to the North Atlantic Blockading Squadron 2 May 1864, Otsego reached Hampton Roads, Virginia, on the 24th, and got underway on 12 June for New Berne, North Carolina, and served in the North Carolina Sounds where she served throughout her career, helping tighten the Union grip on these strategic waters and adjoining territory, primarily guarding the mouth of the Roanoke River against an attack by Confederate ironclad ram CSS Albemarle.

When Lt. Cushing returned from his bold raid which destroyed the dreaded Southern ram on the night of 27–28 October, Otsego, in a group of Union ships under Comdr. William H. Macomb ascended the Roanoke River and attacked Plymouth, North Carolina forcing it to surrender after a bitter fight, 1 November. The Federal forces took 37 prisoners, 22 cannon, vast stores, 200 stands of arms, and the hulk of sunken but still important Albemarle. For more than a month thereafter, Otsego performed reconnaissance and mop up work up the Roanoke River. On 9 December she struck two torpedoes (mines) in quick succession and sank in that river near Jamesville, North Carolina.
