= Flusser =

Flusser may refer to:

- USS Flusser, US ships
- Flusser (surname), Germanic surname
