= USS Colhoun =

Two ships in the United States Navy have been named USS Colhoun, in honor of Rear Admiral Edmund Colhoun.

- USS Colhoun (DD-85), was a Wickes-class destroyer, launched in 1918 and sunk in action off Guadalcanal in 1942.
- USS Colhoun (DD-801), was a Fletcher-class destroyer, launched in 1944 and sunk in action during the battle of Okinawa in 1945.
