= Thomas Barton (Medal of Honor) =

- The US Navy Medal of Honor as would have been awarded to Seaman Barton in 1863
- Born: c. 1831; Cleveland, Ohio
- Military career
- Allegiance: United States
- Branch: United States Navy
- Service years: 1861 - 1882
- Rank: Seaman; Acting Master's Mate; Boatswain
- Units: USS Roanoke (1855); USS Hunchback; USS Henry Brinker (1861); USS Commodore Perry; USRC Levi Woodbury; USS Tennessee (1865); USS Saratoga (1842); USS Constellation; USS Pawnee (1859); USS New Hampshire (1864); USS Wyoming (1859)
- Conflicts: American Civil War • Joint Expedition Against Franklin
- Awards: Medal of Honor

Thomas C. Barton (born c. 1831 in Cleveland, Ohio) was an American seaman who served in the Union Navy during the American Civil War. Barton enlisted in the Navy in June 1861, and resigned in April 1864.

While serving aboard the USS Hunchback during the Joint Expedition Against Franklin, Barton extinguished an ignited howitzer shell which had fallen onto the deck. For this action, Barton was promoted to acting master's mate and awarded the Medal of Honor on 3 April 1863; the citation for the latter read:

On board the U.S.S. Hunchback in the attack on Franklin, Va., 3 October 1862. When an ignited shell, with cartridge attached, fell out of the howitzer upon the deck, S/man Barton promptly seized a pail of water and threw it upon the missile, thereby preventing it from exploding.

== See also ==
- List of Medal of Honor recipients
