= 42nd Street Ferry =

42nd Street Ferry may refer to:

- 42nd Street Ferry (Weehawken), connecting West 42nd Street, Manhattan to the West Shore Railroad's Weehawken Terminal across the Hudson River in Weehawken, New Jersey
- 42nd Street Ferry (Williamsburg), connecting East 42nd Street, Manhattan with Broadway, Williamsburg across the East River
