= 11th Pennsylvania Cavalry Regiment =

Union Army cavalry regiment

11th Pennsylvania Cavalry
- Active: August 1861 - August 13, 1865
- Country: United States
- Allegiance: Union
- Branch: Cavalry
- Engagements: Battle of Beaver Dam Creek; Battle of Seven Pines (5 companies); Battle of Franklin and Blackwater; Battle of Deserted House; Siege of Petersburg; First Battle of Petersburg; Battle of Staunton River Bridge; First Battle of Deep Bottom (detachment); Second Battle of Ream's Station; Battle of Jerusalem Plank Road; Appomattox Campaign; Battle of Five Forks; Battle of Appomattox Court House

The 11th Pennsylvania Cavalry (108th Volunteers) was a cavalry regiment that served in the Union Army during the American Civil War.

== Service ==
The 11th Pennsylvania Cavalry was organized at Philadelphia, Pennsylvania as an independent regiment named "Harlan's Light Cavalry" August through October 1861. The regiment was accepted for state and federal service as the "108th Volunteers" and its designation changed to the 11th Pennsylvania Cavalry on November 13, 1861. It mustered in for three years service under the command of Colonel Josiah Harlan.

The regiment was attached to Department of Virginia to July 1862. Unattached, Division at Suffolk, VII Corps, Department of Virginia, to July 1863. U.S. Forces, Norfolk and Portsmouth, Virginia, Department of Virginia and North Carolina, to October 1863. Cavalry Brigade, Portsmouth, Virginia, Department of Virginia and North Carolina, to April 1864. 2nd Brigade, Cavalry Division, Department of Virginia and North Carolina, to January 1865. 2nd Brigade, Cavalry Division, Department of Virginia, to August 1865.

The 11th Pennsylvania Cavalry mustered out on August 13, 1865, at Richmond, Virginia.

== Detailed service ==
In mid-October, 1861, the 11th Pennsylvania Cavalry moved from Camp Harlan to Camp Palmer because of the unsanitary condition of the former. They remained at Camp Palmer, near Ball's Cross Roads in Washington, D.C., and practiced foot and mounted drills until an outbreak of the measles limited activities. On November 17, the regiment left Camp Palmer as they had been ordered to Camp Hamilton near Fortress Monroe in Virginia. The journey required the regiment to re-cross the Potomac River. However, at this time, the Long Bridge was under construction for some repairs, so this endeavor was more trying and took more time than expected. Many developed colds and were discharged during the winter. They remained at Camp Hamilton for six months where they built more permanent housing, ran drills, and learned how to scout. The soldiers also formed a music band which nearly lasted until the end of the Civil War. In January 1862, they had their first picket duty on the west side of the village of Hampton. The Confederate picket was in Big Bethel, about eight miles from the union camp. The Eleventh approached Big Bethel on February 14 to find the picket abandoned.

In March, two (C and M) of the 12 companies were sent to Newport News. On May 15, Companies A, E G, H, and L traveled to Suffolk, Virginia for picket and outpost duty. At the start of June, the other five companies joined the Army of the Potomac at the White House, participating in operations against J.E.B. Stuart June 13–15, and picket duty at White House and in rear of army until July 2 when they evacuated, retreating to Williamsburg.

- Action at Blackwater, near Zuni, May 30, 1862.
- Companies A, E, G, H, and L ordered to Suffolk, Virginia, June 1862, and picket and outpost duty there and toward the Blackwater until June 1863.
- Company M to Portsmouth, Va., and duty there until March 20, 1863.
- Companies B, C, D, F, I, and K ordered to join the Army of the Potomac at White House, participating in operations against J.E.B. Stuart June 13–15, and picket duty at White House and in rear of army until July 2.
- Operations about New Kent Court House June 23, and about White House June 26-July 2.
- Evacuation of White House July 2, and moved to Williamsburg rejoining other companies at Suffolk August 20, 1862.
- Action at Franklin August 31.
- Reconnaissance from Franklin to Blackwater October 3.
- Suffolk October 15.
- Reconnaissance from Suffolk December 1–3.
- Beaver Dam Creek December 1.
- Near Franklin and Blackwater December 2.
- Suffolk December 12.
- Expedition toward Blackwater January 8–10, 1863.
- Action at Deserted House January 30.
- Norfolk February 10 (Company M).
- Franklin and Blackwater March 17.
- Siege of Suffolk April 12-May 4.
- Somerton Road April 15.
- Edenton Road April 24.
- Reconnaissance through Gates County, N.C., and down the Chowan River June 5–7.
- Near Suffolk June 11 (detachment).
- Expedition to South Anna Bridge June 23–28 (detachment).
- Dix's Peninsula Campaign June 24-July 8.
- South Anna Bridge June 26.
- Hanover Court House June 26.
- Capture of Gen. W. H. F. Lee.
- Expedition from White House to South Anna River July 1–7.
- South Anna Bridge July 4. Moved to Portsmouth, Va., and duty there until January 1864.
- Expedition from Portsmouth to Jackson, N.C., July 25-August 3. 1864.
- Jackson July 28.
- Expedition to Camden and Currituck Counties, N.C., August 5–12. Expedition to Edenton, N.C., August 11–19 (Companies G, I, and K).
- Near Pasquotank August 18.
- South Mills September 12.
- Reconnaissance to Blackwater River September 14–17.
- Expedition from Yorktown to Matthews County October 4–9 (detachment).
- Expedition to South Mills and Camden, N.C., December 5–24.
- Moved to Williamsburg, Va., January 23, 1864, and duty there until April.
- Wistar's Expedition against Richmond February 6–8.
- Scout in Gloucester County February 28.
- Expedition in support of Kilpatrick March 1–4.
- Expedition into King and Queen County March 9–12.
- Carlton's Store March 10.
- Expedition into Matthews and Middlesex Counties March 17–21.
- Reconnaissance to Blackwater April 13–15.
- Butler's operations on south side of the James River and against Petersburg and Richmond May 4–28.
- Kautz's Raid on Petersburg & Weldon Railroad and to City Point, Va., May 5–11.
- Birch Island Bridges May 5. Bird Island Bridges, Blackwater River, May 6.
- Stony Creek Station, Weldon Railroad, May 7.
- White's Bridge, Nottaway Creek, May 8.
- Jarrett's Station and White's Bridge May 9.
- (Companies B and H to Headquarters XVIII Corps May 4; Company H there until September 28.)
- Kautz's Raid on Richmond & Danville Railroad May 12–17.
- Flat Creek Bridge, near Chula Depot, May 14.
- Belcher's Mills May 16. Bermuda Hundred June 2 (detachment).
- Petersburg June 9.
- Before Petersburg June 15–18.
- Siege operations against Petersburg and Richmond June 16, 1864 to April 2, 1865.
- (Company B rejoined the regiment June 20.)
- Wilson's Raid on South Side & Danville Railroad June 22–30, 1864.
- Staunton River Bridge and Roanoke Station June 25.
- Sappony Church or Stony Creek June 28–29.
- Ream's Station June 29.
- Demonstration on north side of the James River at Deep Bottom July 27–29.
- Deep Bottom July 27–28.
- Ream's Station August 18–21.
- Vaughan Road August 22.
- Dinwiddie Road, near Ream's Station, August 23.
- Near Ream's Station August 24.
- Ream's Station August 25.
- Jerusalem Plank Road September 15.
- Sycamore Church September 16.
- Chaffin's Farm, New Market Heights, September 28–30.
- Darbytown Road October 7 and 13.
- Fair Oaks October 27–28.
- Johnson's Farm October 29.
- Darbytown Road December 10.
- Expedition to Fearnsville and Smithfield February 11–15. 1865.
- Appomattox Campaign March 28-April 9.
- Five Forks April 1.
- Gravelly Ford, Hatcher's Run, April 2.
- Deep Creek April 4.
- Amelia Court House April 4–5.
- Prince Edward Court House April 7.
- Appomattox Station April 8.
- Appomattox Court House April 9.
- Surrender of Lee and his army. March to Lynchburg, Va., April 12–16, thence to Richmond April 16–24.
- Expedition to Staunton May 5–11.
- Duty in the Sub-District of Albemarle until July.
- (Company L detached on the eastern shore of Virginia from 1863.)

== Casualties ==
The regiment lost a total of 290 men during service; 3 officers and 67 enlisted men killed or mortally wounded, 220 enlisted men died of disease.

== Commanders ==
- Colonel Josiah Harlan - discharged by special order, August 20, 1862
- Colonel Samuel Perkins Spear - promoted to brevet brigadier general, July 27, 1866 (to date from March 13, 1865); resigned May 9, 1865
- Colonel Franklin Asa Stratton - promoted to brevet brigadier general, March 13, 1865, and mustered out with the regiment

== Notable members ==
- Quartermaster Sergeant Nelson W. Ward, Company M - Medal of Honor recipient for action at the Battle of Staunton River Bridge

== See also ==
- List of Pennsylvania Civil War regiments
- Pennsylvania in the American Civil War
