= USS Emily =

Union Navy steamship

History

United States
- Name: USS Emily
- Operator: Union Navy

General characteristics
- Type: Steamboat

Service record
- Commanders: C. W. Flusser; George Howland
- Operations: American Civil War

USS Emily was a steamboat in the Union Navy during the American Civil War.

In October 1862, Emily fell under the jurisdiction of a Colonel Howard at Roanoke Island, whereat it was lent to Lieutenant Commander C. W. Flusser to ferry Union servicemen wounded in the Joint Expedition Against Franklin to Norfolk Hospital. At some point in its service history, the steamer was captained by George Howland.
