= USS Colhoun (DD-85) =

American Wickes-class destroyer

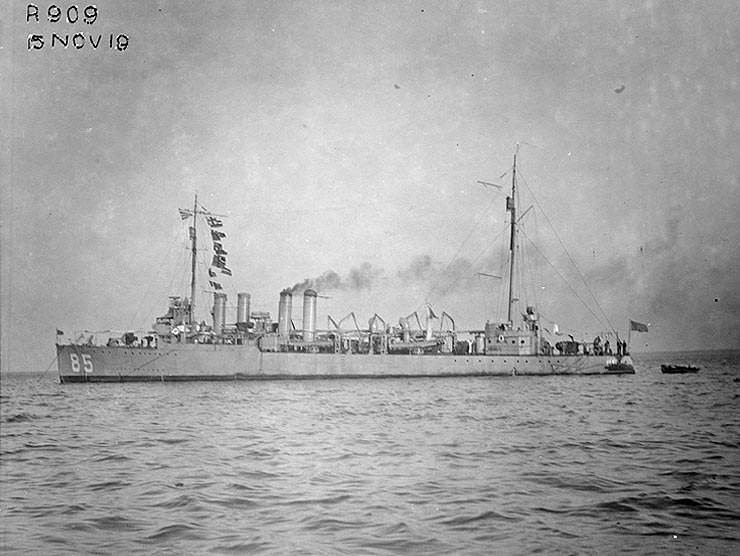
- USS Colhoun (DD-85)

History

United States
- Name: Colhoun
- Namesake: Edmund Colhoun
- Builder: Fore River Shipyard, Quincy, Massachusetts
- Laid down: 19 September 1917
- Launched: 21 February 1918
- Commissioned: 13 June 1918
- Decommissioned: 28 June 1922
- Recommissioned: 11 December 1940, as APD-2
- Fate: Sunk 30 August 1942

General characteristics
- Class & type: Wickes-class destroyer
- Displacement: 1,060 tons
- Length: 315 ft 5 in (96.14 m)
- Beam: 31 ft 9 in (9.68 m)
- Draft: 9 ft 2 in (2.79 m)
- Speed: 35 knots (65 km/h; 40 mph)
- Complement: 100 officers and enlisted
- Armament: 4 × 4 in (102 mm)/50 cal. guns; 1 × 3 in (76 mm)/23 cal. gun; 4 × 3 21 inch (533 mm) torpedo tubes

USS Colhoun (DD-85/APD-2) was a Wickes-class destroyer in the United States Navy during World War I and later redesignated APD-2 in World War II. She was the first Navy ship named for Edmund Colhoun.

Launched in 1918, she remained on convoy duty for the final few months of World War I, and she then operated out of the Atlantic for several years until being decommissioned in 1922. Returning to service in 1940 as a high-speed troop transport, Colhoun was dispatched to support the Guadalcanal campaign early in World War II. While unloading supplies to the island on 30 August 1942, she was attacked by aircraft of the Empire of Japan, and sunk with the loss of 51 men.

== Design and construction ==
Colhoun was one of 111 Wickes-class destroyers built by the United States Navy between 1917 and 1919. She, along with 25 of her sisters, were constructed at Fore River Shipyard shipyards in Quincy, Massachusetts, using specifications and detail designs drawn up by Bethlehem Steel.

She had a standard displacement of 1,060 tonnes (1,040 long tons; 1,170 short tons) an overall length of 315 feet 5 inches (96.14 m), a beam of 31 feet 9 inches (9.68 m) and a draft of 9 feet 2 inches (2.79 m). On trials, Harding reached a speed of 35 knots (65 km/h; 40 mph). She was armed with four 4-inch (102 mm)/50 caliber guns and twelve 21-inch (533 mm) torpedo tubes. She had a regular crew complement of 100 officers and enlisted men. She was driven by two Curtis steam turbines powered by four Yarrow boilers.

Specifics on Colhoun's performance are not known, but she was one of the group of Wickes-class destroyers designed by Bethlehem Steel, built from a different design than the 'Liberty type' destroyers constructed from detail designs drawn up by Bath Iron Works, which used Parsons or Westinghouse turbines. The non-'Liberty' type destroyers deteriorated badly in service, and in 1929 all 60 of this group were retired by the Navy. Actual performance of these ships was far below intended specifications especially in fuel economy, with most only able to make 2,300 nautical miles (4,300 km; 2,600 mi) at 15 knots (28 km/h; 17 mph) instead of the design standard of 3,100 nautical miles (5,700 km; 3,600 mi) at 20 knots (37 km/h; 23 mph). The class also suffered problems with turning and weight.

Colhoun was the first commissioned in the U.S. Navy named for Edmund Colhoun. The second Colhoun was a Fletcher-class destroyer commissioned in 1944.

== Service history ==
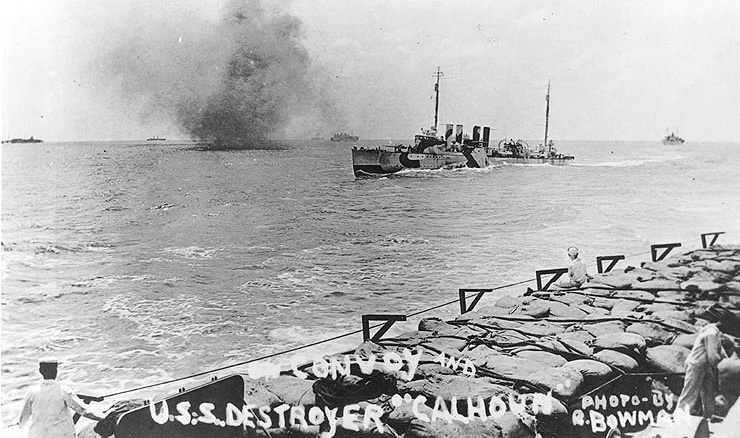
Colhoun is seen in dazzle camouflage while escorting troop transports in mid-1918

Colhoun was launched on 21 February 1918 from Fore River Shipyard and sponsored by Helen A. Colhoun, the daughter of Edmund Ross Colhoun. She was commissioned on 13 June 1918. Reporting to the United States Atlantic Fleet, she was assigned as a convoy escort between New York City and ports in Europe, escorting ships carrying troops and supplies supporting World War I from 30 June and 14 September 1918. On 18 November 1918, she reported to New London, Connecticut, to assist in tests of sound equipment which was under development at the time. On 1 January 1919, she was rushed to assist the troop transport Northern Pacific which had run aground off Fire Island, New York. Colhoun assisted in transporting 194 of the troops off of the ship, who had been returning from Europe, to their destination port in Hoboken, New Jersey.

On 1 December 1919, she was placed in reduced commission at Philadelphia Navy Yard, and then underwent an overhaul at Norfolk Navy Yard. Between 1919 and 1922, Colhoun remained assigned to the Atlantic Fleet on reserve status, based out of Charleston, South Carolina. She took part in sporadic fleet exercises and large maneuvers, as well as taking several midshipman cruises through the Caribbean and along the east coast. In mid-1922, she returned to Philadelphia Naval Yard and was decommissioned on 28 June.

Colhoun was towed to Norfolk Navy Yard on 5 June 1940, and began conversion to a high-speed transport. She was recommissioned into the fleet on 11 December 1940, and received the hull classification symbol of APD-2. Following this, she underwent a year of training exercises between Norfolk and the Caribbean, where she was during the attack on Pearl Harbor, and the entry of the U.S. into World War II.

=== World War II ===
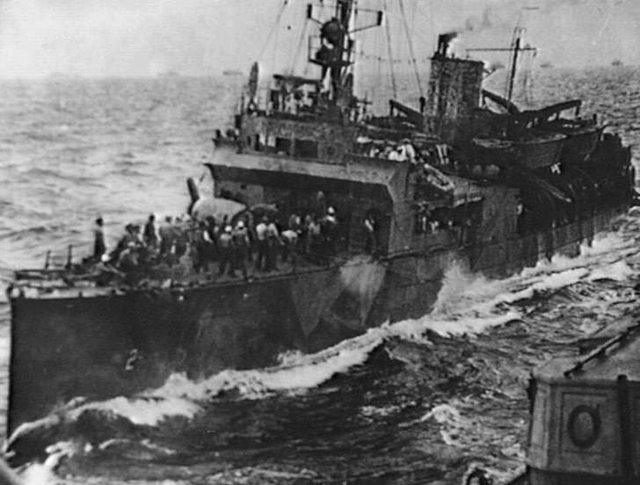
USS Colhoun (APD-2) off Guadalcanal, in August 1942.

With the war underway, she sailed for the Pacific to join the U.S. Pacific Fleet. There, she joined Transport Squadron 12 based out of Pearl Harbor, and began conducting anti-submarine warfare exercises there for a time. She arrived in Nouméa, New Caledonia on 21 July 1942. With a shortage of combat ships at the beginning of the war, Colhoun served a dual role as both a high-speed transport and an anti-submarine warfare vessel. In this role, she began preparations for the invasion of the Solomon Islands. On 7 August 1942, she carried units of the 1st Marine Raider Battalion in the initial assault landings which began the Guadalcanal campaign and continued to serve as both transport and antisubmarine vessel in support of the invasion.

On the morning of 30 August 1942, Colhoun ported at Kukum Point and unloaded stores for the U.S. Marine Corps garrison on Guadalcanal, and then exited the harbor to undertake anti-submarine patrols. Just before 12:00, an air raid siren was issued and Colhoun moved out to sea. A second alert was received at 14:00. Shortly thereafter, a lookout spotted a formation of Japanese aircraft approaching using the sun as cover. The Japanese aircraft, using clouds as cover, dove and released three bombs against Colhoun, two splashing nearby and one striking the after searchlight platform and a nearby boat. The bomb blew the after davits down and forward, blocking the after engine room hatches, and starting a fire from the diesel oil spilled by the boat.

Colhoun attempted to return fire with her anti-aircraft batteries, but the Japanese aircraft remained obscured by clouds. A second dive launched five or six bombs on her starboard side, knocking down the foremast and blowing two 20 millimetres (0.79 in) and one 4 inches (100 mm) gun off the ship. A lubrication oil cooler pump in the after engine room was blown through the bulkhead into the forward engine room. Another two bombs scored direct hits on the after deck house, killing all of the men there. An order was given to abandon ship, and several tank lighters arrived quickly from Guadalcanal to assist in taking in survivors. Colhoun sank at 09°24′S 160°01′E. Fifty-one men were killed and 18 wounded in her sinking. She was stricken from the Naval Vessel Register on 11 September 1942. She received one battle star for her service in World War II.
