= John Breen =

John Breen may refer to:

- John Breen (actor), actor in the film Untraceable
- John Breen (Australian politician) (1898–1966), Australian politician
- John Breen (playwright), Irish playwright
- John Breen (RAF officer) (1896–1964), senior officer in the Royal Air Force
- John Breen (scholar) (born 1956), British Japanologist
- John W. Breen (1907–1984), American football coach and executive
- John Breen (sailor) (1827–1875), Irish soldier who fought in the American Civil War
- John Breen (Irish politician), Irish Labour party politician
