= USS Flusser =

Several ships of United States Navy were named USS Flusser for Charles Williamson Flusser:

- The first USS Flusser (1864) was captured in 1864 and sold in 1865.
- The second USS Flusser (DD-20) was a Smith-class destroyer, commissioned in 1909 and sold in 1919.
- The third USS Flusser (DD-289) was a Clemson-class destroyer, commissioned in 1920 and scrapped in 1930.
- The fourth USS Flusser (DD-368) was a Mahan-class destroyer, commissioned in 1936 and decommissioned in 1946.
