= Daniel Lakin =

- Military career
- Branch: Union Navy
- Years: 1861–1865 (3.9 years)
- Rank: Ensign (acting)
- Unit: USS Commodore Perry
- Conflicts: American Civil War; Joint Expedition Against Franklin
- Awards: Medal of Honor

Daniel Lakin was a Medal of Honor recipient in the Union Navy from 1861–1865

== US Navy ==
Lakin enlisted in the Union Navy from New York on 15 October 1861.

For his actions at the Joint Expedition Against Franklin while serving aboard USS Commodore Perry, Lakin was promoted from seaman to acting master's mate (date-of-rank 25 October 1862) and received the Medal of Honor on 3 April 1863. The citation therefor reads:

On board the U.S.S. Commodore Perry in the attack upon Franklin, Va., 3 October 1862. With enemy fire raking the deck of his ship and blockades thwarting her progress, Lakin remained at his post and performed his duties with skill and courage as the Commodore Perry fought a gallant battle to silence many rebel batteries as she steamed down the Blackwater River.

Lakin was promoted to acting ensign on 18 August 1864, and was honorably discharged a year later on 25 September 1865.

== See also ==
- List of American Civil War Medal of Honor recipients: G–L
- List of Medal of Honor recipients
