= USS Flusser (DD-368) =

Mahan-class destroyer

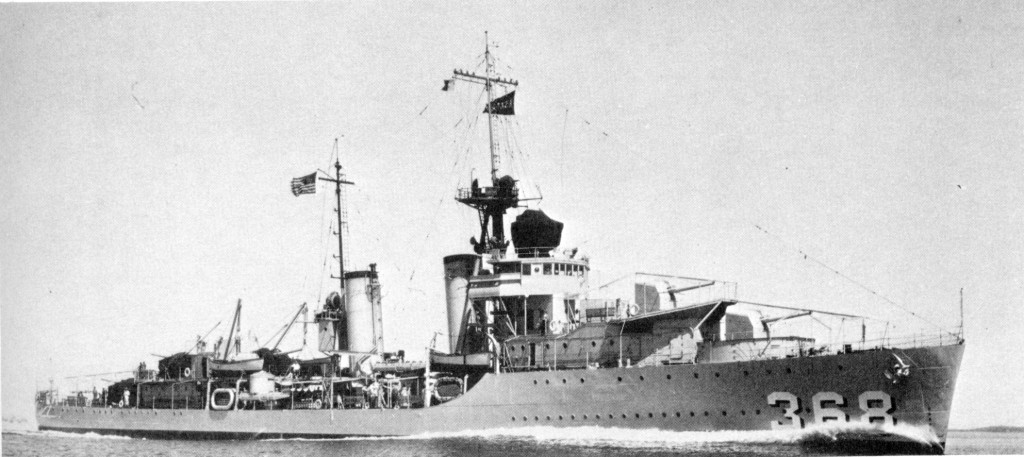
- USS Flusser (DD-368)

History

United States
- Namesake: Charles W. Flusser
- Builder: Federal Shipbuilding and Drydock Company
- Laid down: 4 June 1934
- Launched: 28 September 1935
- Commissioned: 1 October 1936
- Decommissioned: 16 December 1946
- Stricken: 7 April 1947
- Fate: Sold 6 January 1948

General characteristics
- Class & type: Mahan class destroyer
- Displacement: 1,600 tons
- Length: 341 ft 4 in (104.04 m)
- Beam: 36 ft (10.97 m)
- Draft: 9 ft 10 in (3 m)
- Speed: 37 knots (69 km/h)
- Complement: 168 officers and crew
- Armament: As Built: 1 × Gun director above bridge, 5 × 5"(127mm)/38cal DP (5x1), 12 × 21 inch (533 mm) T Tubes (3x4), 4 × .50cal (12.7mm) MG AA (4x1), 2 × Depth Charge stern racks, c1944: 1 × Mk33 Gun Fire Control System, 4 × 5"(127mm)/38cal DP (4x1), 12 × 21 inch (533 mm) T Tubes (3x4), 2 × Mk51 Gun Directors, 4 × Bofors 40 mm AA (2x2), 6 × Oerlikon 20 mm AA (6x1), 2 × Depth Charge roll-off stern racks, 4 × K-gun depth charge projectors

The fourth USS Flusser (DD-368) was a Mahan-class destroyer in the United States Navy before and during World War II. She was named for Charles W. Flusser.

== History ==
Flusser was launched 28 September 1935 by Federal Shipbuilding and Drydock Company, Kearny, New Jersey; sponsored by Mrs. F. W. Packard; and commissioned 1 October 1936.

Flusser sailed from New York 1 December 1936 for a shakedown cruise which found her operating with Squadron 40-T, a unit formed to protect American interests in the Western Mediterranean during the Spanish Civil War. She returned to Hampton Roads 9 February 1937, and for the next 5 months operated along the east coast as far north as Maine. On 16 July, she arrived at San Diego, California, her base for Pacific and Caribbean operations until October 1939, aside from a 2-week visit to Washington earlier that year.

== World War II ==
Based at Pearl Harbor, she took part in intensive training operations with ships of all types, and on 5 December 1941 put to sea screening Lexington (CV-2). Thus away from base at the time of the Japanese attack on Pearl Harbor, Flusser's force sought the retiring Japanese after the attack, then returned to their devastated home port 12 December. Through April 1942, Flusser sailed on convoy escort duty between Pearl Harbor and the west coast, and then cleared for Palmyra Atoll, where on 21 April she landed a small marine garrison. Continuing on, she began a period of escort and patrol service out of various southwest Pacific ports, on several occasions putting into Australian ports.

Overhauled at Pearl Harbor between July 1942 and February 1943, Flusser returned to escort, antisubmarine, and training operations in the southern Solomon Islands. After replenishing at Pearl Harbor between 25 July and 4 August 1942, Flusser returned to Efate 17 August to resume escort and patrol operations to the Fiji Islands, Espiritu Santo, Samoa, and Tonga, returning to Pearl Harbor for overhaul between September and February 1943. Once more at Espiritu Santo 17 February, Flusser again escorted convoys of auxiliaries as well as warships among southwest Pacific bases, to and from Australia, and to Guadalcanal. She returned from Australia to Milne Bay 22 August, and based here for the New Guinea operation. Participating in the landings at Lae and Finschhafen, she conducted preinvasion bombardment, gave fire support cover to the assaults, escorted reinforcement and re-supply convoys, and on 22 September, attacked and sank three Japanese barges at Finschhafen. Flusser next participated in the bombardment and landing at Arawe, New Britain, and had similar duty in the occupation of Cape Gloucester and Saidor.

=== 1944 – 1945 ===
From 11 January 1944 to 30 January, Flusser had a brief overhaul; she then took part in exercises in Australian waters, returning to Milne Bay for duty escorting convoys to Saidor and Cape Gloucester, and taking part in the landings on Los Negros, Admiralty Islands. Her constant activity in the New Guinea area made a west coast overhaul imperative, and she received this at Mare Island between April and June.

Departing Pearl Harbor 1 August 1944, Flusser escorted a convoy to Eniwetok, and arrived at Majuro 16 August for 6 weeks of duty patrolling off the bypassed Japanese-held atolls in the southern Marshall Islands. On 7 September, in an engagement with a shore battery on Wotje, nine of her men were wounded. Leaving Majuro 1 October on escort duty to Eniwetok, Ulithi, and Hollandia, she sailed north for San Pedro Bay, arriving 29 October for patrol duty in Leyte Gulf and Surigao Strait. On 18 November, she shot down a kamikaze plane, which crashed so close aboard that the pilot's parachute landed on the ship's forecastle.

Continuing her support of the Philippines operation, Flusser escorted reinforcement convoys to Leyte from Hollandia, and on 4 December 1944, received damage from the near miss of a Japanese suicide plane. A heavy air attack was launched at her group the next day, during which Flusser downed several planes, and rescued survivors of LSM-20 following a kamikaze attack. The destroyer sailed from Leyte 6 December to cover the landings at Ormoc Bay, and next day her group was attacked by the first of many waves of suicide planes. Flusser shot down at least one of these, and aided survivors of stricken ships, screening Lamson (DD-367) back to San Pedro.

Flusser sailed to Hollandia and Biak to prepare for the Lingayen operation, and arrived in Lingayen Gulf escorting the second group of reinforcements 13 January 1945. She covered the landings at Nasugbu on 31 January, then participated in the assault at Puerto Princesa, Palawan, as well as convoying escort forces between Leyte, Mindoro, and Palawan.

Flusser remained in the Philippines, joining in the landings on Cebu 26 March 1945 and escorting support convoys to that island, then escorted resupply convoys from Morotai to Polloc Harbor and Davao Gulf until 1 July. She participated in the Balikpapan operation, covering the landings, and escorting ships from Morotai, until 20 July, when she arrived at Manila. After brief overhaul, she sailed 31 August for escort duty to Okinawa, then arrived at Sasebo 16 September for occupation duty. Her officers served on teams inspecting Japanese naval and merchant shipping at Sasebo until 29 October, when the destroyer departed for San Diego, arriving 19 November.

== Fate ==
During the summer of 1946, Flusser took part in Operation Crossroads, the atomic weapons tests in the Marshalls. She returned to Pearl Harbor from this duty 14 September, and on 12 November arrived at Norfolk, Virginia, where she was decommissioned 16 December 1946 and sold 6 January 1948.

Flusser received eight battle stars for World War II service.
