= Joint Expedition Against Franklin =

Coordinated military engagement of American Civil War

- Part of the American Civil War
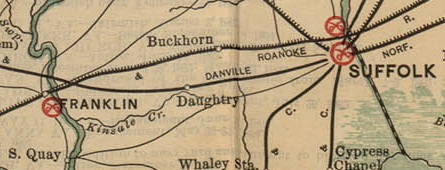
- Extract from 1892 map of the subject area. The Blackwater River flows north-south in left of the image.
Date	3 October 1862
Location	Franklin, Virginia & nearby Blackwater River
Result	Confederate victory

Belligerents
United States Navy; United States Army	Confederate States Army

Commanders and leaders
C. W. Flusser; Edmund R. Colhoun; Charles A. French; Samuel P. Spear	Dennis Dozier Ferebee; J. K. Marshall; Edward Graham; Collet Leventhorpe

Strength
3 Gunboats; 1,300 Infantry w/1 Artillery section	10,000–12,000 Infantry

Casualties and losses
5 KIA, 21 wounded	Estimated 70–100

The Joint Expedition Against Franklin was a joint engagement between the United States Army and Navy against the Confederate States Army during the American Civil War. The engagement was intended to move Union forces into an area where Confederate forces were gathering as they prepared to move on Suffolk, Virginia. Originally planned as a coordinated two-pronged attack with a naval flotilla supporting an infantry advance on Franklin, Virginia, communications delays caused the Navy to start the mission before the Army was ready to support it. Instead, 3 October 1862 found Union Naval forces on the Blackwater River greatly outnumbered by Confederate infantrymen and ultimately forced to retreat. The naval action alone is also known as the Action at Crumpler's Bluff or the Battle of Crumpler's Bluff.

Simultaneously, a nearby Army reconnaissance team conducted a failed assault on the town on the basis that the audibly nearby Naval forces—which they did not know were then in retreat—would bring support. The outcome left the Union forces with a combined 5 killed and 21 wounded. Dialogue between officers following the conflict left the Navy questioning the usefulness of gunboats in joint expedition settings in which they would not be capable of supporting themselves.

== Background ==
Receiving orders early 12 September 1862, the Confederate Army's 4th North Carolina (NC) Cavalry immediately proceeded from Garysburg, North Carolina to Franklin, Virginia, arriving late the next day. There, the 4th NC Cavalry, under the command of a Colonel Dennis Dozier Ferebee, was joined by the 52nd North Carolina Infantry, Edward Graham's Petersburg Artillery, and (two weeks later) the 11th North Carolina Infantry. The 4th NC Cavalry's first major assignment was to construct a floating bridge across the nearby Blackwater River to replace the Seaboard and Roanoke Railroad bridge and thereby facilitate the eastward transfer of men and equipment into Franklin. Col. Ferebee reported the bridge finished on 18 September.

A small Union army cavalry force was stationed in nearby Suffolk, Virginia under the command of Major General John J. Peck. On 23 September, Peck sent Colonel Samuel P. Spear to reconnoiter Franklin and the Confederates therein. Spear reported back to Peck about the Confederates' replacement bridge capable of supporting artillery pieces, as well as an estimated Confederate concentration of 10,000–12,000 men. Peck forwarded this information on to his commanding officer, Major General John Adams Dix who, in turn, developed a twofold mission to roust the enemy from Franklin and destroy the floating bridge with a joint service attack with the Army and Navy respectively.

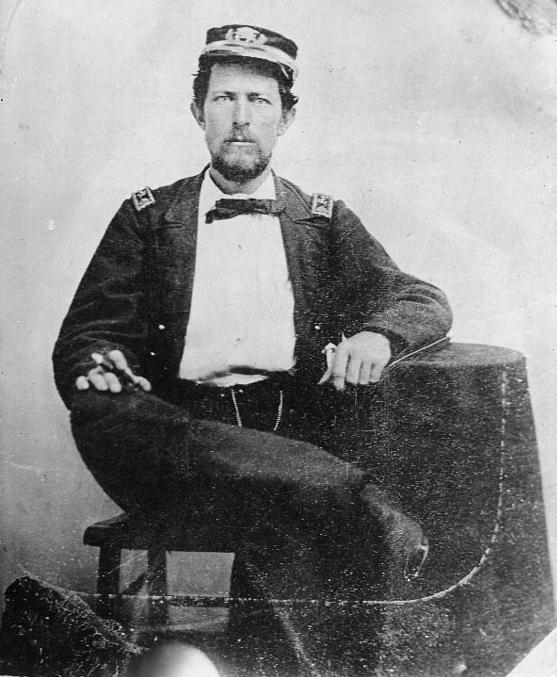
LCDR C. W. Flusser (1864)

Dix requested Union naval support from Acting Rear Admiral Samuel Phillips Lee. Lee, in turn, sent orders to Lieutenant Commander C. W. Flusser, directing him to give all assistance to General Dix's purposes. Three United States Navy steam-powered ferryboats stationed at Albemarle Sound were sent; USS Commodore Perry, commanded by Lieutenant Commander Flusser, USS Hunchback, commanded by Acting Lieutenant Edmund R. Colhoun, and USS Whitehead, commanded by Acting Master Charles A. French.

Acting on Union picket intelligence of the Confederates' position in Franklin, both Generals Peck and Dix felt that it would be wiser to wait on the joint assault. However, because Dix's messenger arrived five hours late, Commander Flusser never received word that the former's forces were delaying "until about the 10th". Peck did however order a reconnaissance mission be undertaken in the area; at 9:00 p.m. on October 2, Colonel Spear left Suffolk with 1,300 soldiers, one artillery section, and orders to survey Franklin and determine the extent of the Confederate forces south of Suffolk.

== Attack ==
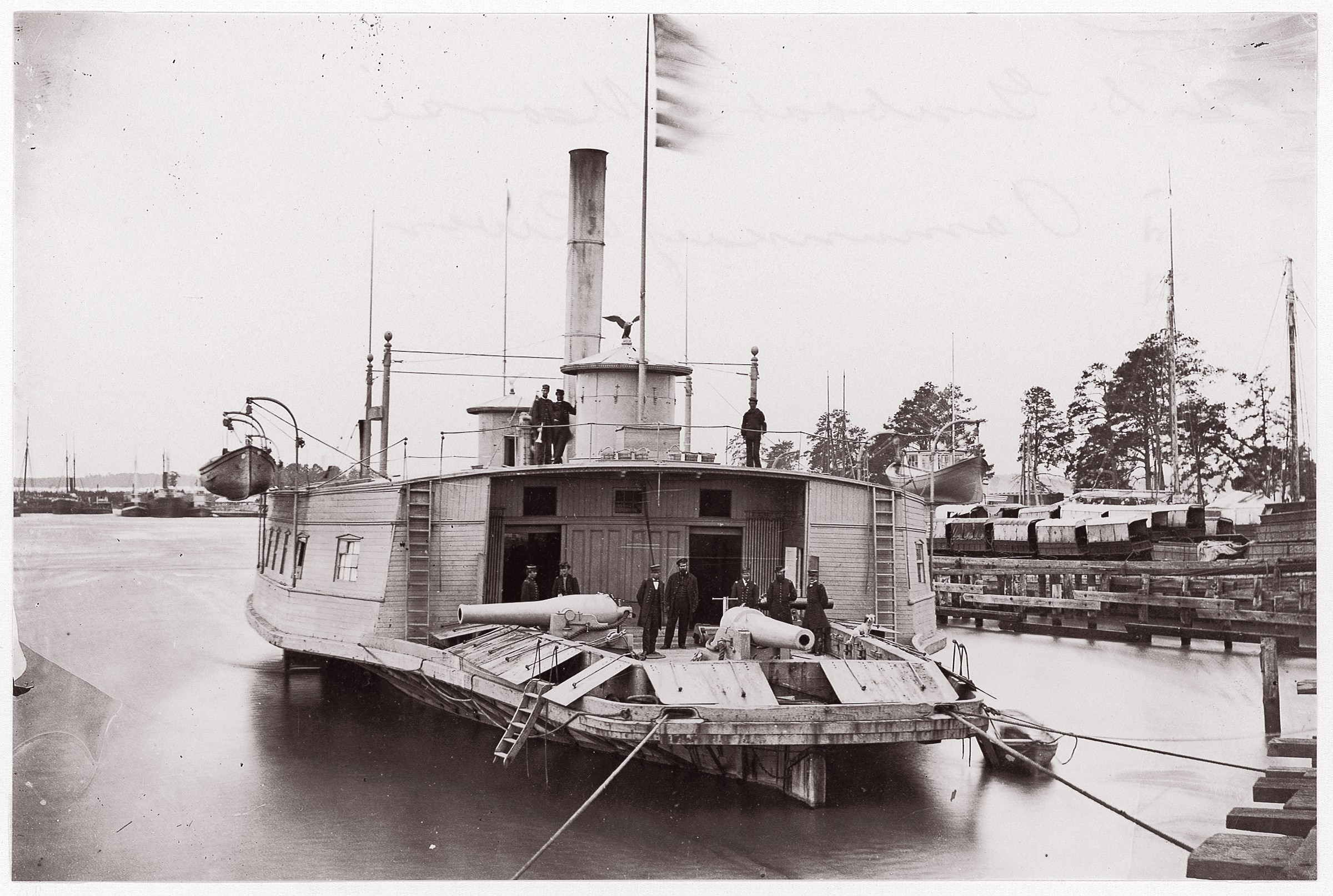
USS Commodore Perry (on Pamunkey River, early 1860s)

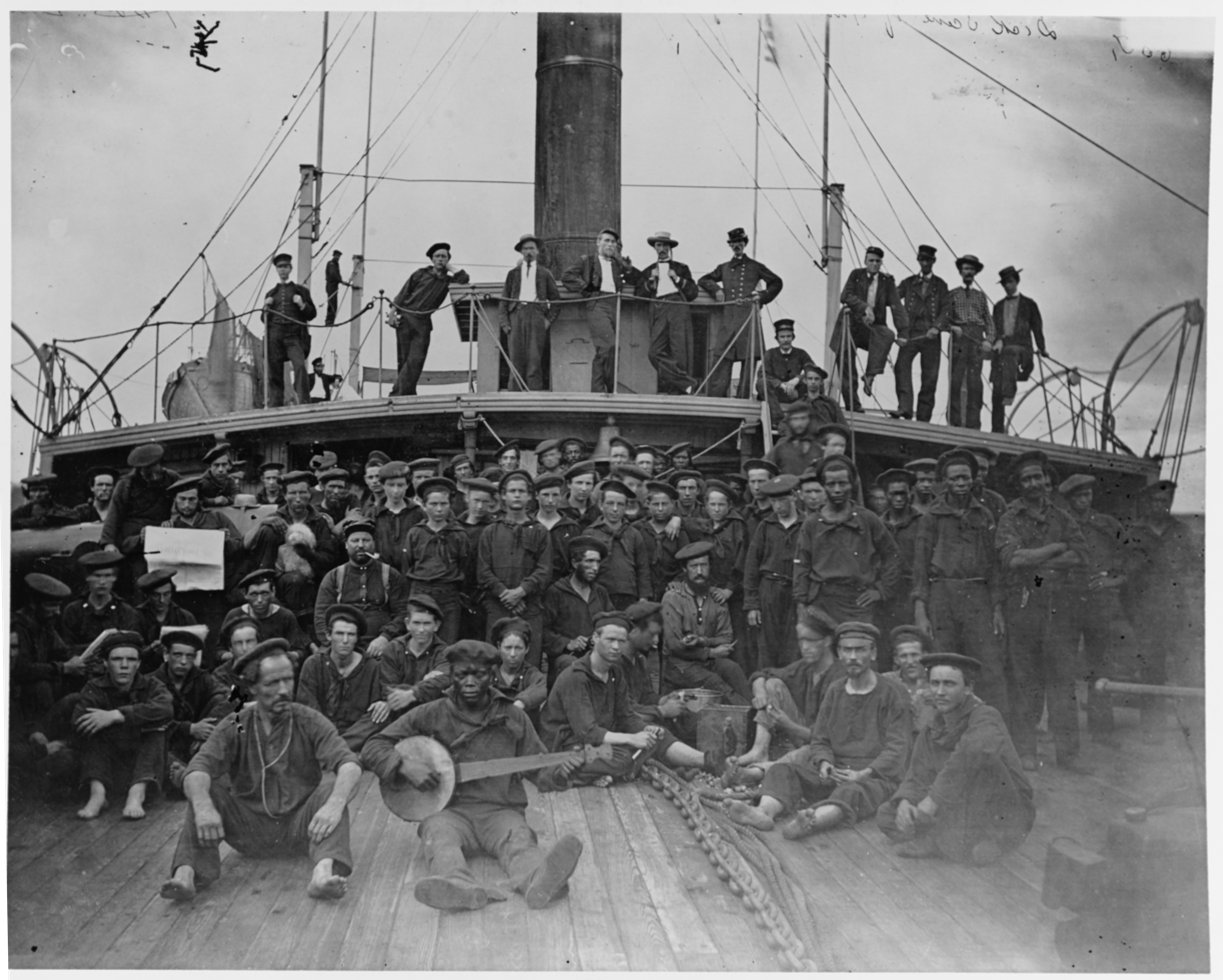
USS Hunchback and crew

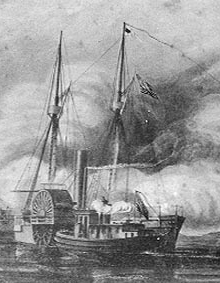
USS Whitehead (1864)

The evening of 2 October, Confederate pickets observed the three riverboats waiting around South Quay, Virginia, approximately three miles (4.8 km) downriver from Franklin. At 5:45 a.m. the next day, the three ships began moving towards the city while shelling the nearby banks. The attack was led by Commodore Perry, followed by Whitehead astern Hunchback. While the Union shelled the banks of the Blackwater, Confederate troops began distributing themselves along the riverside to take advantage of the concealment there. Some of the 4th North Carolina Cavalry was dismounted and taken up by Colonel Marshall of the 52nd, and positioned along with his men at Crumpler's and neighboring bluffs to fire upon the riverboats. Colonel Ferebee took the rest of the 4th NC Cavalry, dismounted them, and positioned them behind the trees and bushes along the banks of the Blackwater, under the command of a Lieutenant Ruffin. According to a Union naval officer later, the Confederates' forces along the Blackwater also included "some nonuniformed irregulars and even 'some negroes.'"

At 7:00 a.m., approximately .75 miles (1.21 km) from Franklin, Commodore Perry came under fire from the Confederate forces along the river and atop the bluffs. As Perry was too close to bring its large-bore guns to bear, Commander Flusser ordered his sailors to shelter themselves as best they could while the ship tried to steam past the enemy. Due to the narrowness of the bend, Commodore Perry ran aground; Lt. Ruffin and his men were so close to the grounded riverboat, they later claimed to have heard Perry's officers cursing the enlisted sailors. Freed, Perry rounded the bend and maneuvered to provide suppressive fire to allow Hunchback and Whitehead to follow; the combined shelling of all three ships forced Lt. Ruffin and his detachment to withdraw from the banks of the river. However, all three ships' progress was soon halted by a barricade in the river. While the barricade was removable with Commander Flusser's available manpower, he could not attempt to do so due to the "terrible fire to which [they] were exposed." While continuing to assault the Confederacy with their "IX-inch grape and shell" guns, "32-pounder" guns, field gun, and muskets, the three ships waited at the barricade hoping to hear the gunfire of General Dix's infantry forces.

At 10:15 a.m., Commander Flusser ordered retreat from the river barrier. All three ships remained under heavy fire by enemy forces from multiple angles until between 2:30 and 3:30 p.m. An incomplete rear barricade of felled trees failed to stop the ships which "[pushed through] with a heavy head of steam." Flusser later opined that this new barricade would have been impassable had the ships remained north of it for several more hours, waiting for General Dix's quiescent forces.

Meanwhile, Colonel Spear arrived around 1:00 p.m. and anticipating support from the now-retreating naval gunships, his Union infantrymen fought with the Confederates in Franklin. After six hours of combat, running low on ammunition, realizing that he only had 1,300 men (not the 1,700–2,000 he'd thought), and losing two riflemen to Confederate defection, Spear withdrew the Union forces around Franklin, and returned to Suffolk abandoning one brass field piece, a few overcoats, and a horse.

=== Aftermath ===
Upon return to Albemarle Sound, Commander Flusser sent Hunchback on to Plymouth to bury their dead sailors; at Roanoke Island, Flusser was lent USS Emily to carry the wounded to Norfolk Naval Hospital.

== Outcome ==
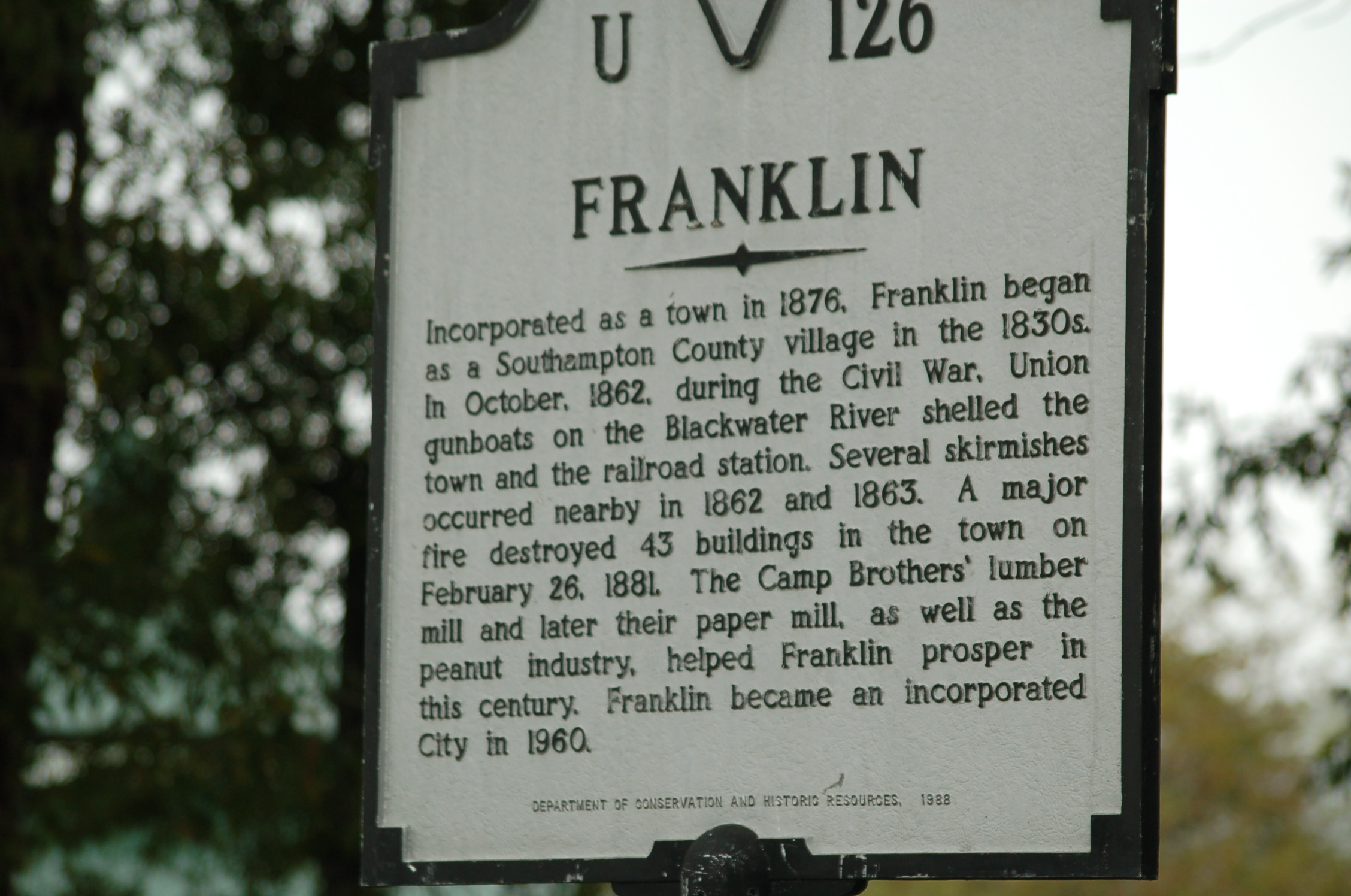
1988 sign noting the occurrence of several Civil War skirmishes around Franklin in 1862 and 1863

The Confederate forces around Franklin held back the Navy and ultimately forced them, and the Army reconnaissance team, to retreat. While the Union Navy lost no ships, they suffered four deaths and 15 wounded; the Army suffered one death and six wounded, although General Dix believed the infantry to have robbed the enemy of 70–100 in return. For the Confederates, this was the 4th NC Cavalry's first combat action of the war, and gave Colonel Ferebee and his men confidence in their abilities; they and the other Confederate forces in Franklin spent the rest of October 1862 surveilling the Union forces across the river. After the Union shelling, most of Franklin's civilians left the town, leaving it in the hands of the Confederate soldiers there; they did not return until after the April 1865 surrender of General Lee. The Joint Expedition has been described as the only fighting of significance to occur in Southampton County, Virginia during the war.

For their distinguished services in the battle, Union servicemen Thomas Barton, John Breen, James H. Burbank, Daniel Lakin, Alfred Peterson, Edwin Smith, and John Williams were all awarded the Medal of Honor. In his summation of the Joint Expedition Against Franklin, Acting Rear-Admiral Lee said, "The Department will perceive that Lieutenant-Commander Flusser (senior officer present) displayed his usual gallantry, and that the officers and crews of the three gunboats did their parts well, under very trying and difficult circumstances."

In his after action report to Admiral Lee of 6 October 1862, Lieutenant Commander Flusser described his losses as heavy and opined that it was "folly to fight these people on the banks, where they have every advantage", and that he could not be of any further service to the Army forces. In the aftermath of the failed mission, both Navy and Army flag officers suggested that the cause was attempting to cooperate with the respective sister service. Admiral Lee wrote to Naval Secretary Gideon Welles that "where the situation does not allow [...] gunboats to take care of themselves, they can not assist the army." Further, General Peck wrote to General Dix saying, "there is great uncertainty in operations with gunboats."
