= Edwin Smith (Medal of Honor) =

United States Navy sailor

- Born: c. 1841; New York City
- Military career
- Allegiance: United States
- Branch: United States Navy
- Rank: Master's Mate
- Unit: USS Whitehead
- Conflicts: American Civil War • Joint Expedition Against Franklin
- Awards: Medal of Honor

Edwin Smith (born c. 1841, date of death unknown) was a Union Navy sailor in the American Civil War and a recipient of the U.S. military's highest decoration, the Medal of Honor, for his actions during the Joint Expedition Against Franklin.

Born in about 1841 in New York, New York, Smith joined the Navy from that state. By October 3, 1862, he was serving as an ordinary seaman on the USS Whitehead. On that day, during the Joint Expedition Against Franklin, Virginia, Smith swam to shore despite heavy Confederate fire to assist his ship after it became grounded in the Blackwater River. He was later awarded the Medal of Honor for this act.

Smith was promoted to Master's Mate the same month, but his appointment was revoked in March 1865 due to sickness. He was dishonorably discharged in April 1867.

Smith's official Medal of Honor citation reads:

On board the U.S.S. Whitehead in the attack upon Franklin, Va., 3 October 1862. When his ship became grounded in a narrow passage as she rounded a bend in the Blackwater River, Smith, realizing the hazards of lowering a boat voluntarily swam to shore with a line under the enemy's heavy fire. His fearless action enabled his ship to maintain steady fire and keep the enemy in check during the battle.
