= John Williams (Medal of Honor, born 1832) =

- Born: 1832; Blair County, Pennsylvania
- Died: Unknown
- Military career
- Allegiance: United States
- Branch: United States Navy
- Rank: Seaman
- Unit: USS Commodore Perry
- Conflicts: American Civil War • Joint Expedition Against Franklin
- Awards: Medal of Honor

John Williams (born 1832, date of death unknown) was a Union Navy sailor in the American Civil War and a recipient of the U.S. military's highest decoration, the Medal of Honor, for his actions during the Joint Expedition Against Franklin.

Born in 1832 in Blair County, Pennsylvania, Williams was still living in that county when he joined the Navy. By October 3, 1862, he was serving as a seaman on the USS Commodore Perry. On that day, as the ship steamed down the Blackwater River during the Joint Expedition Against Franklin, Virginia, Williams remained at his post despite heavy fire. For this action, he was awarded the Medal of Honor six months later, on April 3, 1863.

Williams' official Medal of Honor citation reads:

On board the U.S.S. Commodore Perry in the attack upon Franklin, Va., 3 October 1862. With enemy fire raking the deck of his ship and blockades thwarting her progress, Williams remained at his post and performed his duties with skill and courage as the Commodore Perry fought a gallant battle to silence many rebel batteries as she steamed down the Blackwater River.
