= 42nd Street Ferry (Williamsburg) =

Former ferry in Manhattan and Brooklyn, New York

The 42nd Street Ferry was a ferry route connecting Manhattan and Williamsburg, Brooklyn, New York City, United States, joining 42nd Street (Manhattan) and Broadway (Brooklyn) across the East River.

== History ==
The Brooklyn and New York Ferry Company, which operated the 23rd Street Ferry from the foot of Broadway, began operating to 42nd Street on December 2, 1901, improving access from Williamsburg to Grand Central Terminal on 42nd Street in Manhattan. The route was discontinued in 1909.

== Surface connections ==
At the foot of 42nd Street, passengers could transfer to streetcars of the 42nd Street Crosstown Line past Grand Central Terminal to the West 42nd Street Ferry, as well as several lines operating on First Avenue:

- Broadway Line via 42nd Street and the Upper West Side to the Fort Lee Ferry
- East Belt Line along the East River from South Ferry to East Harlem, serving all the East River ferries
