= Nelson W. Ward =

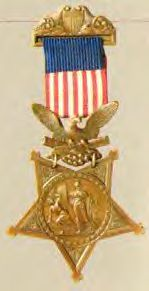
- Medal of Honor, 1862–1895 Army version
- Born: November 15, 1837; Columbiana County, Ohio, US
- Died: February 5, 1929 (aged 91); Long Beach, California, US
- Military career
- Allegiance: United States; Union
- Branch: United States Army; Union Army
- Service years: 1861 – 1865
- Rank: Quartermaster Sergeant
- Units: Company M, 11th Pennsylvania Cavalry
- Conflicts: American Civil War; Battle of Staunton River Bridge
- Awards: Medal of Honor

Nelson W. Ward (November 20, 1837 – February 5, 1929) was a United States Army Medal of Honor recipient, honored for his actions while a private in the 11th Pennsylvania Cavalry during the Battle of Staunton River Bridge of the American Civil War. He also was the author of one book.

== Biography ==
Ward was born in Columbiana County, Ohio, on November 20, 1837. He was married to Emily "Emma" Jane Hall on September 14, 1865. The couple moved to Greene County, Missouri shortly after their marriage. Nelson and Emma had two children: Joseph Edgar, born September 22, 1866; and Virginia, born 1869.

In the late 1890s, he bought the Grundie Hotel in Springfield, Missouri, which he operated until about 1904. In the early 1900s, his family moved to Long Beach, California, where he lived for the rest of his life.

Ward published the book, 'The Master Key' to the Problems of Passion Week and the Resurrection According to the Scriptures in 1915.

His first wife, Emma, died on September 9, 1916, in Long Beach. He married Minnie Zurada Souder between Emma's death and 1920.

== Military service ==
Ward enlisted in the 11th Pennsylvania Cavalry on August 5, 1861, and eventually attained the rank of Quartermaster Sergeant in that regiment. He received the Medal of Honor for his actions at the Battle of Staunton River Bridge on June 25, 1864. Ward led a charge from land without meaningful cover onto a railroad bridge that was secured on both sides by Confederate troops. Although his commanding officer had been killed, he led a successful assault of the bridge despite the Union forces suffering heavy casualties.

== Medal of Honor citation ==
Citation:

Voluntarily took part in a charge; went alone in front of his regiment under a heavy fire to secure the body of his captain, who had been killed in the action.

== See also ==
- List of Medal of Honor recipients
