= USS Lodona =

Gunboat of the United States Navy

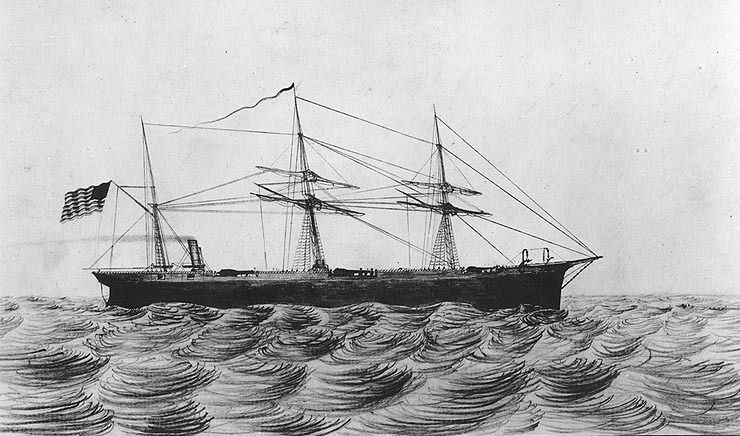
- USS Lodona by Commander Edmund Colhoun USN

History

United Kingdom
- Name: Lodona
- Owner: Zachariah Charles Pearson
- Port of registry: Hull, England
- Builder: M. Samuelson & Co, Hull
- Yard number: 52
- Launched: 1862
- Maiden voyage: 25 May 1862
- Stricken: 1865 (est.)
- Fate: Captured by Union Navy forces 4 August 1862

History

United States
- Name: Lodona
- Owner: United States Navy
- Acquired: 20 September 1862
- Commissioned: 5 January 1863
- Decommissioned: 11 May 1865
- Fate: Sold, 20 June 1865

General characteristics
- Type: iron-hulled cargo steamer (1862); naval gun boat (1863-1865)
- Tonnage: 688 GRT
- Displacement: 750 long tons (760 t)
- Length: 210 ft (64 m)
- Beam: 27 ft 6 in (8.38 m)
- Draft: 11 ft 6 in (3.51 m)
- Depth of hold: 16 ft 6 in (5.03 m)
- Propulsion: steam engine; screw-propelled
- Speed: 7 knots
- Complement: (1863) 97
- Armament: (1863) one 100-pounder Parrott rifle; one 30-pounder Parrott rifle; one 9" Dahlgren rifle; four 24-pounder guns

USS Lodona was a British steamship of the same name captured by the Union Navy during the American Civil War. She had been built in England for shipowner Zachariah Pearson and attempted to break the United States' blockade of Confederate ports. USS Lodona was used by the Navy to patrol waters off those ports. After the war she returned to commercial ownership.

== Blockade runner ==
Lodona, a bark-rigged iron screw steamer, was built by M. Samuelson & Son at Kingston-upon-Hull, England, as Yard No.52 in 1862 for shipowner Zachariah Charles Pearson, who was also Mayor of Hull when the American Civil War broke out. She had an iron-hull with a length of 204.2 ft (62.2 m), a beam of 28.4 ft (8.7 m), a depth of 16.5 ft (5.0 m) and a draft of 14.0 ft (4.3 m). She measured 688 GRT and 573 NRT and was powered by a 2-cylinder marine steam engine of 80 nhp, driving a single screw. On completion, Lodona was issued British Official Number 43827 and signal letters TQMJ, and was registered at the port of Hull.

She sailed from Hull on 28 May 1862 for London to load cargo for Beaufort, North Carolina.

Captured by Union gunboat USS Unadilla while attempting to run the blockade in Ossawbaw Sound, South Carolina, on 4 August 1862, Lodona was taken to Philadelphia, Pennsylvania, under Lt. C. H. Greene for adjudication.

== United States Navy service ==
=== Assigned to the South Atlantic Blockade ===
Condemned, she was purchased by the Navy from the Philadelphia Prize Court on 20 September 1862 and commissioned as USS Lodona at Philadelphia Navy Yard on 5 January 1863 with Acting Lieutenant Edmund R. Colhoun in command. Assigned to Rear Adm. Samuel F. DuPont’s South Atlantic Blockading Squadron, Lodana departed Philadelphia on 7 January 1863 for Port Royal, South Carolina, touching at Hampton Roads and Fort Monroe, Virginia, where she took in tow monitor USS Weehawken, arriving Port Royal 5 February. The warship sailed 5 days later for Charleston, South Carolina, towing schooner E. W. Gardner, joining the blockade there the next day.

On the 19th, she headed for Bull's Bay to take up blockading. Lodana remained on active blockade off the coast of South Carolina, at Bull’s Bay or Charleston, returning intermittently to Port Royal for supply or repairs through September. On 20 April, the steamer captured English brig Minnie out of Nassau, Bahamas, attempting to run the blockade in Bull’s Bay and sent her to Philadelphia.

=== Engaging the guns on Morris and Folly Islands ===
From 12 to 16 June, the warship’s batteries engaged the Confederate guns on Morris and Folly Islands in Charleston Harbor. Lodona next provided support in the attacks by ironclads on Morris Island and Fort Sumter 17 August; attacked Fort Wagner the next day, and, on the 20th, returned once again to Morris Island. She continued operations against the Charleston forts 8 and 9 September by sending boats in the attack on Fort Sumter, losing one boat and crew captured. The ship sailed north 10 September, arriving Philadelphia on the 16th.

Lodona remained at Philadelphia Navy Yard overhauling until 11 November and then stood out for Charleston. At sea on the 15th, she captured schooner Arctic and sent the prize to Washington, D.C. The warship arrived Charleston 17 November, then proceeded to blockade duty in Sapelo Sound, Georgia. Arriving 20 November, she operated from there, capturing sloop Hope on 10 July 1864, until sailing for Port Royal on 20 April 1865 following news of Robert E. Lee’s surrender.

=== Post-war decommissioning and sale ===
The steamer put to sea on 24 April for Philadelphia Navy Yard arriving 1 May 1865. She decommissioned there on 11 May and was sold at public auction on 20 June.
