= Flusser (surname) =

Flusser is a surname. Notable people with the surname include:

- Alan Flusser (born 1945), American writer and clothing designer
- Charles W. Flusser (1832–1864) United States Navy officer
- David Flusser (1917–2000), Israeli academic
- Jan Flusser (*1962), Czech computer scientist and mathematician
- Vilém Flusser (1920–1991), Czech-Brazilian Jewish philosopher, writer and journalist
