= Samuel P. Spear =

US Army general (1815-1875)

- Spear in the uniform of a Colonel in the Union Army, C. 1862
- Born: c. 1815; Boston, United States
- Died: May 4, 1875 (aged 59–60); New York City, United States
- Burial place: Cypress Hills National Cemetery
- Military career
- Allegiance: United States; Union; Fenian Brotherhood
- Branch: United States Army; Union Army; Irish Republican Army
- Service years: 1833–1865 (American service)
- Rank: Colonel; Brevet Brigadier General
- Unit: 2nd U.S. Cavalry Regiment
- Commands: 11th Pennsylvania Cavalry Regiment; 2nd Brigade, Cavalry Division, Army of the James
- Conflicts: Seminole Wars; Mexican–American War; Battle of Cerro Gordo; American Civil War; Joint Expedition Against Franklin; Second Battle of Ream's Station; Battle of Fair Oaks & Darbytown Road; Battle of Five Forks; Fenian Raids; Pigeon Hill Raid

Samuel Perkins Spear (c. 1815 – May 4, 1875) was an American soldier who saw combat in the Seminole Wars, the Mexican–American War, and the Civil War.

Spear enlisted in the army in 1833, and was assigned twice to the 2nd Dragoons and once to the 2nd Cavalry in which he was promoted from private to first sergeant each time.

Spear was discharged from the U.S. Regular Army on August 6, 1861. He was appointed lieutenant colonel of the 11th Pennsylvania Cavalry Regiment and was promoted to colonel on August 20, 1862. He commanded his regiment at the Joint Expedition Against Franklin, October 3, 1862.

He commanded the brigade to which his regiment was assigned in the XVIII Corps; serving in the Department of Virginia and North Carolina to which his regiment was assigned from August 1863 to April 28, 1864. For the rest of 1864 his corps was part of the Army of the James. In January 1865 his brigade had become the 2nd Brigade of the Cavalry Division of said army.

He led his brigade at the Second Battle of Ream's Station, August 25, 1864, the Battle of Fair Oaks & Darbytown Road, October 27–28, 1864 and the Battle of Five Forks, April 1, 1865, during the Siege of Petersburg. Spear was wounded at the Battle of Five Forks and resigned from the volunteers on May 9, 1865.

On January 13, 1866, President Andrew Johnson nominated Spear for appointment to the grade of Brevet brigadier general of volunteers for his actions as a brigade commander at the Battle of Fair Oaks & Darbytown Road, to rank from April 13, 1865, and the United States Senate confirmed the appointment on March 12, 1866.

After the Civil War, Spear became a Major-general in the Irish Republican Army within the Fenian Movement in America and lead the eastern wing of the Fenian Army from St Albans, Vermont into Canada during June 6–7, 1866. He also served as the Fenian Secretary of War within the Fenian Brotherhood during the late 1860s.

== See also ==
- List of American Civil War brevet generals (Union)
