= USS Flusser (DD-289) =

Clemson-class destroyer

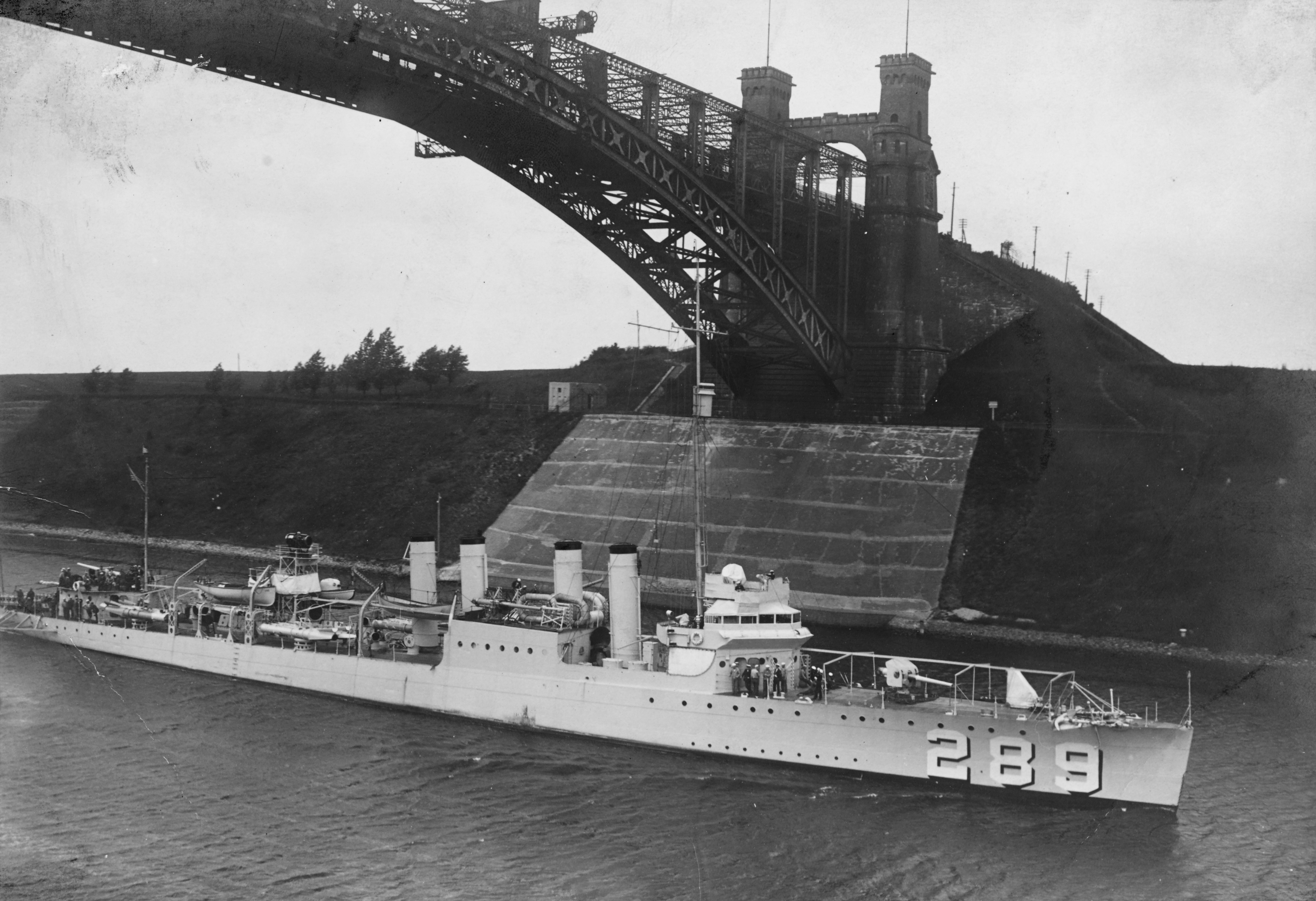
- USS Flusser (DD-289) transiting the Kiel Canal c1924

History

United States
- Namesake: Charles W. Flusser
- Builder: Bethlehem Shipbuilding Corporation, Squantum Victory Yard
- Laid down: 21 July 1919
- Launched: 7 November 1919
- Commissioned: 25 February 1920
- Decommissioned: 1 May 1930
- Stricken: 22 October 1930
- Fate: Sold for scrapping, 17 January 1931

General characteristics
- Class & type: Clemson-class destroyer
- Displacement: 1,290 long tons (1,311 t) (standard); 1,389 long tons (1,411 t) (deep load)
- Length: 314 ft 4 in (95.8 m)
- Beam: 30 ft 11 in (9.42 m)
- Draught: 10 ft 3 in (3.1 m)
- Installed power: 27,000 shp (20,000 kW); 4 water-tube boilers
- Propulsion: 2 shafts, 2 steam turbines
- Speed: 35 knots (65 km/h; 40 mph) (design)
- Range: 2,500 nautical miles (4,600 km; 2,900 mi) at 20 knots (37 km/h; 23 mph) (design)
- Complement: 6 officers, 108 enlisted men
- Armament: 4 × single 4-inch (102 mm) guns; 2 × single 1-pounder AA guns or; 2 × single 3-inch (76 mm) guns; 4 × triple 21 inch (533 mm) torpedo tubes; 2 × depth charge rails

USS Flusser (DD-289) was a Clemson-class destroyer built for the United States Navy during World War I.

== Description ==
The Clemson class was a repeat of the preceding Wickes class although more fuel capacity was added. The ships displaced 1,290 long tons (1,311 t) at standard load and 1,389 long tons (1,411 t) at deep load. They had an overall length of 314 feet 4 inches (95.8 m), a beam of 30 feet 11 inches (9.4 m) and a draught of 10 feet 3 inches (3.1 m). They had a crew of 6 officers and 108 enlisted men.

Performance differed radically between the ships of the class, often due to poor workmanship. The Clemson class was powered by two steam turbines, each driving one propeller shaft, using steam provided by four water-tube boilers. The turbines were designed to produce a total of 27,000 shaft horsepower (20,000 kW) intended to reach a speed of 35 knots (65 km/h; 40 mph). The ships carried a maximum of 371 long tons (377 t) of fuel oil which was intended gave them a range of 2,500 nautical miles (4,600 km; 2,900 mi) at 20 knots (37 km/h; 23 mph).

The ships were armed with four 4-inch (102 mm) guns in single mounts and were fitted with two 1-pounder guns for anti-aircraft defense. In many ships a shortage of 1-pounders caused them to be replaced by 3-inch (76 mm) guns. Their primary weapon, though, was their torpedo battery of a dozen 21 inch (533 mm) torpedo tubes in four triple mounts. They also carried a pair of depth charge rails. A "Y-gun" depth charge thrower was added to many ships.

== Construction and career ==
Flusser, named for Charles W. Flusser, was launched 7 November 1919 by Bethlehem Shipbuilding Corporation, Squantum, Massachusetts; sponsored by Mrs. Maude F. Williams; and commissioned 25 February 1920. Flusser's first active service was patrol duty in Mexican waters between 9 May 1920 and 17 June, based at Key West. She carried out a comprehensive training schedule along the east coast and in the Caribbean until 18 June 1924 when she sailed from Newport, Rhode Island for a tour of duty with U.S. Naval Forces, Europe, calling at ports in 15 countries before returning to New York 16 July 1925.

Returning to east coast and Caribbean operations, Flusser aided in the development of destroyer tactics and carried reservists on training cruises until decommissioned at Philadelphia 1 May 1930. She was scrapped 22 October 1930 in accordance with the terms of the London Treaty limiting naval armaments.
