= USS Colhoun (DD-801) =

Fletcher-class destroyer

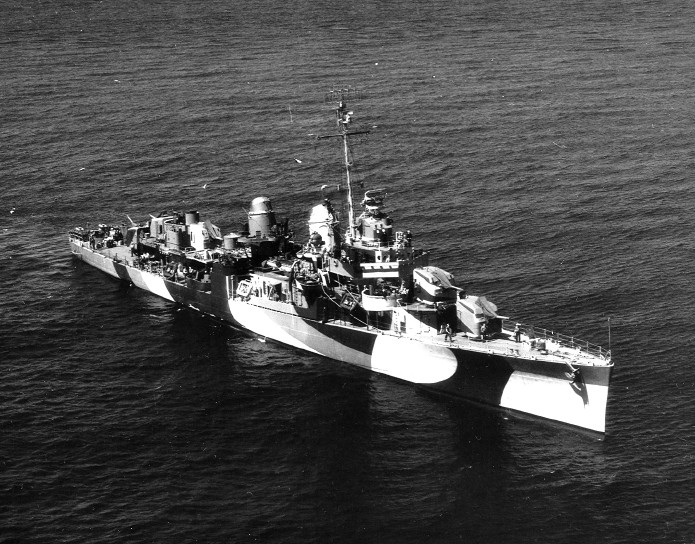
- USS Colhoun (DD-801)

History

United States
- Name: USS Colhoun
- Namesake: Edmund Colhoun
- Builder: Todd Pacific Shipyards, Seattle, Washington
- Laid down: 3 August 1943
- Launched: 10 April 1944
- Commissioned: 8 July 1944
- Honours and awards: 1 Battle Star
- Fate: Sunk by Kamikaze, 6 April 1945

General characteristics
- Class & type: Fletcher-class destroyer
- Displacement: 2,050 tons
- Length: 376 ft 6 in (114.76 m)
- Beam: 39 ft 8 in (12.09 m)
- Draft: 17 ft 9 in (5.41 m)
- Propulsion: 60,000 shp (45,000 kW); 2 propellers
- Speed: 38 knots (70 km/h; 44 mph)
- Range: 6,500 nmi (12,000 km; 7,500 mi) at 38 knots (70 km/h; 44 mph)
- Complement: 273
- Armament: 5 × 5-inch 38 caliber; 10 × 40 mm AA guns; 7 × 20 mm AA guns; 10 × 21 inch (533 mm) torpedo tubes; 6 × depth charge projectors; 2 × depth charge tracks

USS Colhoun (DD-801), a Fletcher-class destroyer, was the second ship of the United States Navy to be named for Rear Admiral Edmund Colhoun (1821–1897).

Colhoun was launched 10 April 1944 by Todd-Pacific Shipbuilding Corp., Seattle, Washington; sponsored by Captain K. K. Johnson, WAC; and commissioned 8 July 1944.

== Service history ==
Colhoun arrived at Pearl Harbor 10 October 1944 for training and patrol duty. Arriving off Iwo Jima 19 February 1945, she screened transports, served as radar picket and gave fire support for the invasion of Iwo Jima. On 1 March, she was hit by a salvo from heavy enemy batteries ashore, which killed one man and injured 16. After repairs at Saipan, Colhoun sailed for Okinawa, arriving 31 March for radar picket duty.

At 1530 on 6 April 1945, during the first heavy kamikaze raid of the battle of Okinawa, Colhoun received a request for help from USS Bush and sped to her aid. Interposing her guns between Bush and the attacking suicide planes, Colhoun downed three planes before a kamikaze crashed into the 40 mm (1.6 in) mount scattering flaming wreckage across the ship and dropping a bomb into the aft fireroom where it exploded. Retaining power and using emergency steering, Colhoun awaited the next attacking trio, shooting down the first two while the third struck her on the starboard side.

The bomb from the second kamikaze exploded, breaking Colhoun's keel, piercing both boilers, ripping a 20 by 4 ft (6.1 by 1.2 m) hole below the waterline, and starting oil and electrical fires. Operating the remaining guns manually, the crew gamely faced yet another wave of three attackers shooting down one and damaging another, while the third kamikaze struck her aft section. This airplane's bomb bounced overboard and exploded, adding another 3 ft (0.91 m) hole to allow more flooding. Colhoun valiantly struggled to stay afloat, but a final kamikaze crashed into the bridge in a mass of flames. At 1800, LCS-84 took off all but a skeleton crew, which remained onboard while a tug attempted to tow Colhoun to Okinawa. Heavy listing, uncontrolled flooding, and fires made it impossible to save her, and she was sunk by gunfire from USS Cassin Young (DD-793) at 27°16′N 127°48′E. Her casualties were: 34 killed and 21 wounded.

== Awards ==
Colhoun received one battle star for World War II service.
