= Brooklyn and New York Ferry Company =

The Brooklyn and New York Ferry Company was a ferry company that operated between Manhattan and Brooklyn, New York City, United States.

== History ==
The Williamsburgh Ferry Company was established in 1824, taking over the existing Grand Street Ferry.

In early January 1886, the property of the New York Ferry Company was transferred to the new Brooklyn and New York Ferry Company.
