= John Breen (sailor) =

Irish soldier who fought in the American Civil War

- Born: c. 1827; Ireland
- Died: December 13, 1885; Milwaukee, Wisconsin, US
- Burial place: Calvary Cemetery and Mausoleum, Milwaukee
- Military career
- Allegiance: United States of America
- Branch: United States Navy
- Service years: 1861 to July 1864
- Rank: Boatswain's mate
- Unit: (New York (state))
- Awards: Medal of Honor

Boatswain's Mate John Breen (c. 1827 – December 13, 1885) was an Irish soldier who fought in the American Civil War. Breen received the United States' highest award for bravery during combat, the Medal of Honor, for his action at Petersburg, Virginia on October 3, 1862. He was honored with the award on April 3, 1863.

== Biography ==
Breen's grave at Calvary Cemetery

Breen was born in 1827 in Ireland to William and Margaret Breen. He moved to New York and first enlisted into the United States Navy in 1852 under the name Charles Mercer. He was discharged after three years but later reenlisted under his correct name at the outbreak of the Civil War in 1861. During this service he was assigned to various vessels including the USS Brandywine, the USS Isaac N. Seymour and the USS Commodore Perry. It was aboard the Commodore Perry that Breen earned the Medal of Honor for his action on October 3, 1862 in successfully repelling Confederate ground troops positioned at the Blackwater River.

Following the war, Breen and his wife, Ellen Grant, relocated to Milwaukee where he continued a career as a sailor. He died on December 13, 1885 of acute pneumonia and his remains are interred at the Calvary Cemetery and Mausoleum in Milwaukee.

== Medal of Honor citation ==
On board the U.S.S. Commodore Perry in the attack upon Franklin, Va., 3 October 1862. With enemy fire raking the deck of his ship and blockades thwarting her progress, Breen remained at his post and performed his duties with skill and courage as the Commodore Perry fought a gallant battle to silence many rebel batteries as she steamed down the Blackwater River.

== See also ==
- List of American Civil War Medal of Honor recipients: A–F
