= Edmund Colhoun =

Edmund Ross Colhoun
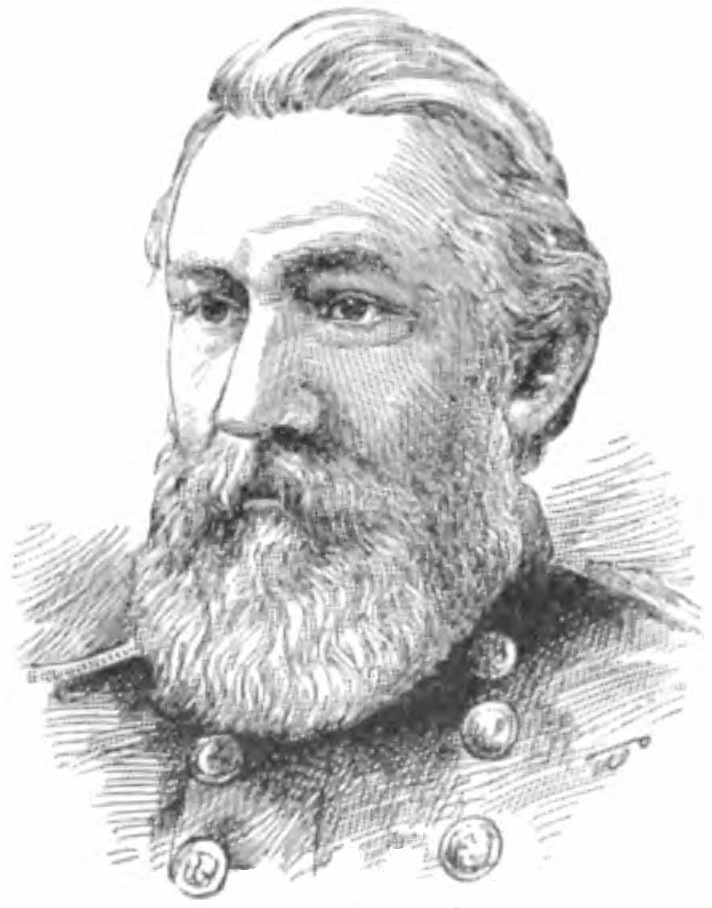
- Born: May 6, 1821; Chambersburg, Pennsylvania, US
- Died: February 17, 1897 (aged 75); Washington, D.C., US
- Burial place: Arlington National Cemetery
- Military career
- Allegiance: United States of America
- Branch: United States Navy
- Service years: 1839–1853; 1861–1883
- Rank: Rear Admiral
- Commands: USS Shawsheen; USS Hunchback; USS Lodona; USS Weehawken; USS Saugus; USS Hartford; Asiatic Squadron; USS Richmond; Mare Island Navy Yard
- Conflicts: Mexican–American War: Alvarado; Tabasco; American Civil War: Union blockade; Battle of Roanoke Island; Battle of New Bern; Joint Expedition Against Franklin; First Battle of Fort Fisher; Second Battle of Fort Fisher

Signature
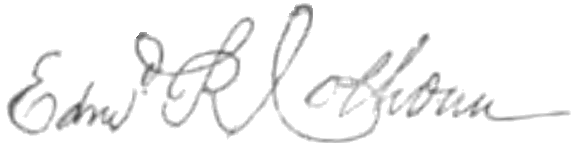

Edmund Ross Colhoun (6 May 1821 – 17 February 1897) was a rear admiral of the United States Navy who served during the Mexican War and the American Civil War, in which he was commended for his participation in the bombardment and capture of Fort Fisher.

== Naval career ==
=== Service from 1839 to 1853 ===
Colhoun was born at Chambersburg, Pennsylvania, on 6 May 1821 and was appointed a midshipman on 1 April 1839. He was attached to the sloop-of-war USS Marion in the Brazil Squadron from 1839 to 1841, then to the frigate USS Congress in the Mediterranean Squadron and Brazil Squadron from 1842 to 1844. He then attended the Philadelphia Naval School in Philadelphia, Pennsylvania, in 1845 and, after completing his studies, was promoted to passed midshipman on 2 July 1845.

Colhoun next served aboard the frigate USS Cumberland from 1846 to 1847, seeing action in the Mexican War, first under Commodore David Conner in the first attack on Alvarado, Mexico, and then under Commodore Matthew C. Perry at Tabasco, Mexico.

From 1850 to 1851, Colhoun served aboard a receiving ship at Philadelphia, then aboard the frigate USS St. Lawrence in the Pacific Squadron from 1851 to 1853, being promoted to master on 6 January 1853. He resigned from the Navy on 27 June 1853.

=== Service from 1861 to 1883 ===
With the onset of the American Civil War in April 1861, Colhoun returned to U.S. Navy service, becoming an acting lieutenant on 24 September 1861. From 1861 to 1862 he was commanding officer first of the steam tugboat USS Shawsheen, then of the steamer USS Hunchback, both operating as part of the Union blockade of the Confederate States of America in the North Atlantic Blockading Squadron. In command of Hunchback, he saw combat at the Battle of Roanoke Island on 7–8 February 1862, the Battle of New Bern on 14 March 1862, and in an engagement on the Blackwater River south of Franklin, Virginia, on 3 October 1862 during the joint expedition against Franklin.

Promoted to commander on 17 November 1862, Colhoun took command of the steamer USS Lodona in the North Atlantic Blockading Squadron in 1863. Later that year, he became commanding officer of the monitor USS Weehawken in the South Atlantic Blockading Squadron, and led Weehawken in various actions against Confederate forts – among them Fort Sumter, Fort Wagner, and Fort Beauregard – between 10 July and 15 September 1863. He next commanded the monitor USS Saugus from 1864 to 1865, engaging Howlett's Battery on the James River in Virginia on 21 June and 5 December 1864 and taking her into action in North Carolina in both the First Battle of Fort Fisher in December 1864 and the Second Battle of Fort Fisher in January 1865. He was commended for his participation in the bombardment and capture of Fort Fisher.

After the war, Colhoun had special duty at New York City in 1866 before serving as Fleet Captain of the South Pacific Squadron from 1866 to 1867. He was promoted to captain on 2 March 1869 and was commanding officer of the monitor USS Dictator from 1869 to 1870. He commanded the sloop-of-war USS Hartford, flagship of the Asiatic Squadron, from 1873 to 1874 and was in command of the entire Asiatic Squadron from 12 January 1874 to 29 May 1874. He then took command of the sloop-of-war USS Richmond, flagship of the South Pacific Squadron, in August 1874.

Leaving Richmond in July 1875, Colhoun was promoted to commodore on 26 April 1876 and took command of Mare Island Navy Yard in Vallejo, California, on 17 April 1877. On 15 January 1881, he relinquished command of the navy yard and was on special duty until 1882 as inspector of vessels in California. He was promoted to rear admiral on 3 December 1882 and retired from the Navy on 6 May 1883 upon reaching the mandatory retirement age of 62.

== Personal life ==
Colhoun married the former Mary Ann Reed (15 July 1825 – 11 February 1916) in 1845. They had three sons and three daughters, four of whom survived him.

Colhoun died suddenly of heart failure at his home in Washington, D.C., late on the evening of 17 February 1897. He is buried with his wife at Arlington National Cemetery in Arlington, Virginia.

== Namesakes ==
Two U.S. Navy destroyers have been named USS Colhoun in Colhoun's honor.

== Notes ==
Military offices
Preceded by Enoch Greenleafe Parrott	Commander, Asiatic Squadron; 12 January 1874–29 May 1874	Succeeded by Alexander Mosely Pennock
