= USS Commodore Perry =

United States Navy gunboat from 1861 to 1865

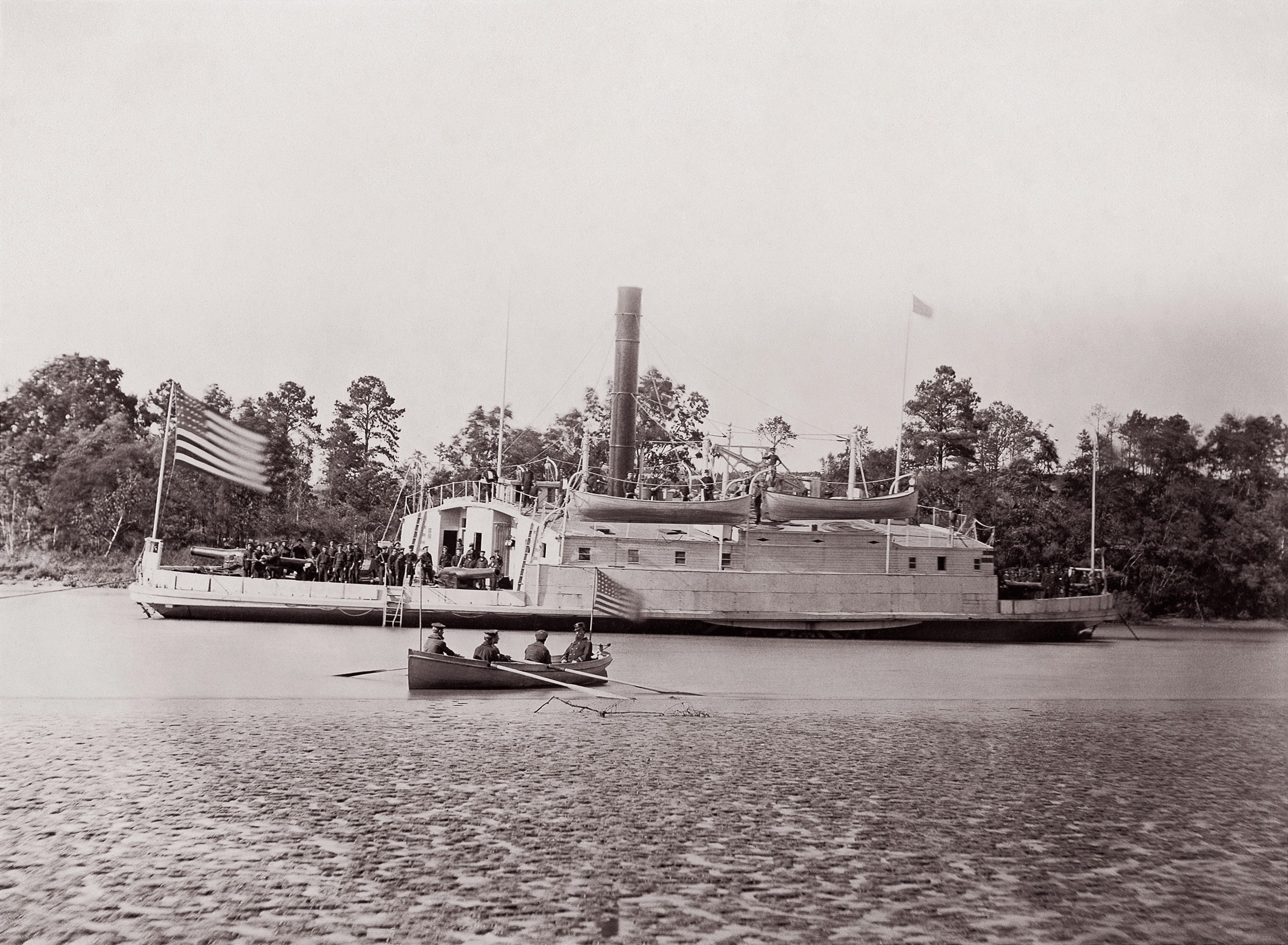
- USS Commodore Perry, Pamunkey River, photographed by Timothy H. O'Sullivan

History

United States
- Name: Commodore Perry
- Namesake: Commodore Oliver Hazard Perry
- Launched: 1859 at Williamsburg, New York
- Acquired: 2 October 1861
- Commissioned: October 1861
- Decommissioned: 26 June 1865
- Fate: Sold, 12 July 1865

General characteristics
- Type: Gunboat
- Displacement: 512 long tons (520 t)
- Length: 143 ft (44 m)
- Beam: 33 ft (10 m)
- Draft: 10 ft (3.0 m)
- Propulsion: Steam engine; side wheel-propelled
- Speed: 7 knots (13 km/h; 8.1 mph)
- Complement: 125
- Armament: 2 × 9 in (230 mm) guns; 2 × 32-pounder smoothbore guns; 1 × 12-pounder howitzer

USS Commodore Perry was a 512-long-ton (520-tonne) steamer acquired by the Union Navy in 1861, the first year of the American Civil War. She was named after Commodore Oliver Hazard Perry (1785–1819), a naval officer who had commanded American forces on Lake Erie in the War of 1812. In January–February 1862, Commodore Perry was part of the North Atlantic Blockading Squadron, taking part in the attack, in cooperation with the Union Army, which resulted in the surrender of Roanoke Island by the Confederate States of America. She participated in several other campaigns through 1862, including the capture of Elizabeth City, North Carolina, and army–navy expeditions against Franklin, Virginia, and Hertford, North Carolina. From 1863 until the end of the war, she was engaged in patrols, both inland and in Virginia coastal waters.

Commodore Perry was outfitted as a gunboat with heavy guns and a large crew of 125 officers and enlisted personnel. Her powerful guns were capable of doing considerable damage to blockade runners or shore fortifications of the Confederate States of America.

== Service history ==
Commodore Perry — an armed, side-wheel ferry — was built in 1859 by Stack and Joyce, Williamsburg, New York; purchased by the Navy on 2 October 1861 and commissioned later in the month, Acting Master F. J. Thomas in command. The ship was named in honor of Commodore Oliver Hazard Perry, who commanded American forces on Lake Erie in the War of 1812, and his brother Matthew Calbraith Perry, who negotiated the Convention of Kanagawa historic treaty which opened Japan to American commerce, and who had died the previous year, in 1858.

=== Civil War ===
Commodore Perry sailed from Hampton Roads, Virginia on 17 January 1862 to join the North Atlantic Blockading Squadron, and on 7–8 February took part in the attack, in cooperation with the Union Army, which resulted in the surrender of Roanoke Island, part of the long campaign through which the Navy secured key coastal points.

On 9 July 1862, at 2 a. m., the U.S. gunboats Commodore Perry, Shawsheen and Ceres, left Plymouth, N.C., and steamed up the Roanoke River on an expedition to Hamilton, where a large force of Confederates was reported to be stationed. On the Perry, which was commanded by Navy Lieut. O. W. Flusser, were 20 men of Co. F, of the 9th New York Volunteer Infantry Regiment, (Hawkins' Zouaves,) under Capt. W. W. Hammell. On the Shawsheen were 10 men of the same company under Sergeant David J. (better known as Jack) Green, and ten men on the Ceres, commanded by Lieut. Joseph A. Greene, also of Co. F. Lieut. Flusser, in his report to Flag Officer Goldborough, says: "About 1 o'clock p.m. in. we were fired upon from the south bank of the river by musketry, returned the fire with great guns and small arms, and pushed on for Hamilton, where I hoped to meet the enemy in force. We were under fire for two hours running very slowly and keeping a lookout for a battery. Two or three miles below Hamilton we found a deserted battery. At Hamilton we landed 100 men, soldiers and sailors, and one field piece, but the rebels, who fired on us from high banks, where they were comparatively safe, were afraid to meet us. The steamer Wilson, belonging to the rebels, run into our hands at Hamilton and was taken possession of. The officers and men both soldiers and sailors behaved with great spirit."

Acting Master Mac Diarmid, in command of the Ceres, in his report of the affair to his superior officer, under the date of 10 July 1862, says : "When within a few miles of Hamilton, was fired on by the enemy from the left bank with small arms. Returned fire with great guns and small arms. This firing was kept up on both sides until within one-half-mile of Hamilton. Lieutenant Greene was wounded in the leg by first volley, but sat on deck and loaded the muskets for his men."

Commodore Perry took part in the capture of Elizabeth City, North Carolina on 10 February, and the next day captured the schooner Lynnhaven. As operations along the North Carolina coast continued, she joined in the capture of New Berne and Washington in March, and in April took singly or in concert with others of her squadron four schooners and a sloop in the Pasquotank River and New Begun Creek. On 3 October, Commodore Perry joined in an Army-Navy expedition against Franklin, Virginia, and on 10 December joined an attack against Plymouth, North Carolina. Four crewmen were awarded the Medal of Honor for their actions during the expedition against Franklin: Boatswain's Mate John Breen, Seaman Daniel Lakin, Seaman Alfred Peterson, and Seaman John Williams. After another combined expedition against Hertford, North Carolina on 30 January 1863, Commodore Perry patrolled constantly in Pamlico and Albemarle Sounds and the streams which enter them, frequently exchanging fire with small detachments of Confederates ashore.

Repaired at Norfolk, Virginia and Baltimore, Maryland late in 1863, she returned to her squadron in March 1864 for duty in the inland and coastal waters of Virginia on picket, guard, and patrol duty, joining in many amphibious expeditions, until the close of the war. She sailed from Norfolk for New York City on 12 June 1865, and there was decommissioned on 26 June. On 12 July, she was sold to the New York and Brooklyn Ferry Company for $16,500 ($347,038 in present-day terms).
