= Charles W. Flusser =

United States Navy officer

Charles Williamson Flusser
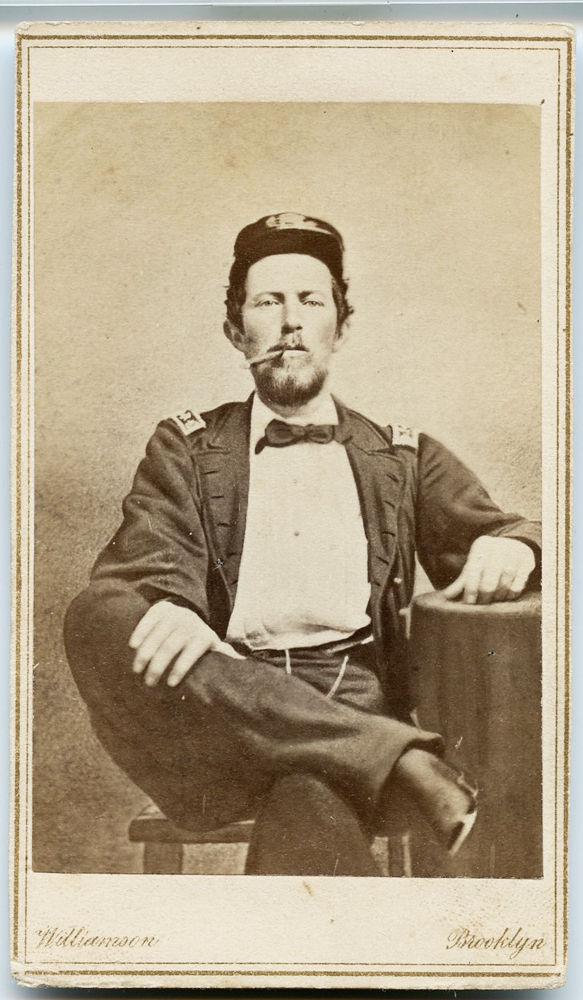
- Lieutenant Commander Charles W. Flusser, USN, 1864
- Born: September 27, 1832; Annapolis, Maryland
- Died: April 16, 1864 (aged 31); Plymouth, North Carolina
- Burial place: United States Naval Academy Cemetery
- Military career
- Allegiance: United States of America
- Branch: United States Navy
- Service years: 1847–1864
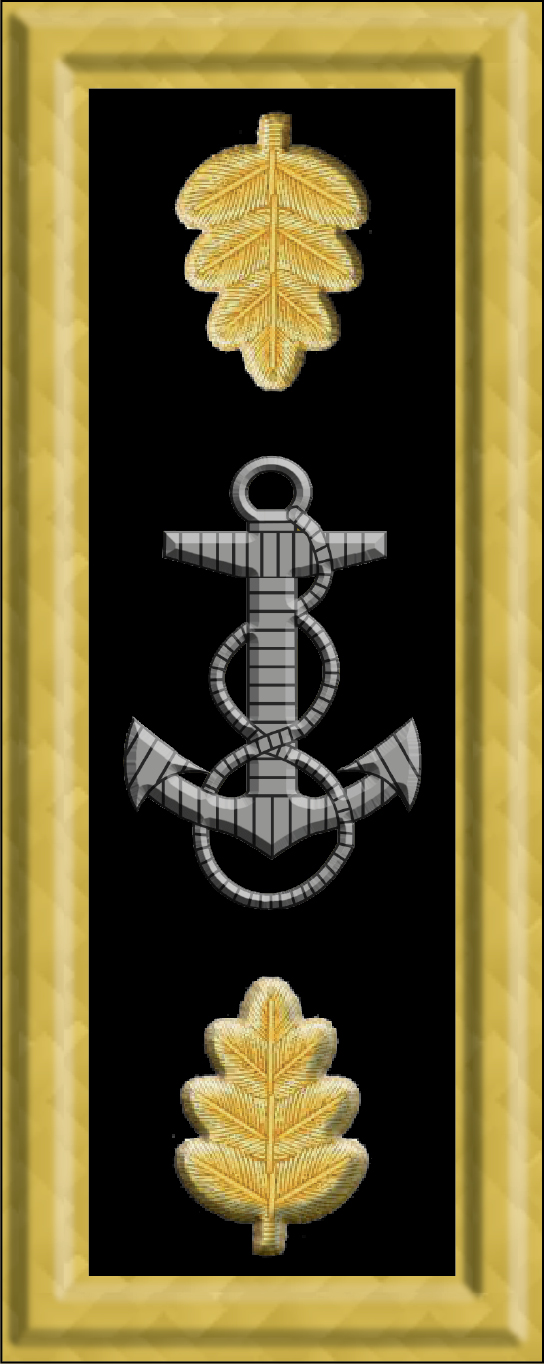
- Rank: Lieutenant commander
- Commands: USS Commodore Perry; USS Miami
- Conflicts: American Civil War: Burnside's North Carolina Expedition; Joint Expedition Against Franklin; Battle of Plymouth †

Charles Williamson Flusser (September 27, 1832 – April 19, 1864) was an officer in the United States Navy during the American Civil War.

== Biography ==
Born at Annapolis, Maryland, Flusser entered the United States Naval Academy in 1847 and graduated with the Class of 1853 with the rank of passed midshipman. He received promotion to master and then lieutenant on September 15 and 16, 1855, while serving in the South American Squadron. In early 1861, Flusser was appointed to the Naval Academy in Annapolis, and oversaw its relocation to Fort Adams in Newport, Rhode Island.

Flusser served on blockade duty off the coast of Georgia in late 1861, before being appointed commander of the gunboat Commodore Perry for the Burnside Expedition, taking part in the victory at the Battle of Elizabeth City in February 1862.

Flusser was promoted to lieutenant commander in July 1862, also assuming command of all Union gunboats in Albemarle Sound. He took part in the expedition against Franklin, Virginia, in October 1862, with his ship only narrowly escaping capture.

Flusser was killed in action on April 19, 1864, during the Battle of Plymouth, commanding the Union naval forces present. In the engagement between the Miami and Southfield against the Confederate ironclad CSS Albemarle. In that action, Flusser personally fired a cannon shell at the Confederate ironclad. The shell, with a 10-second fuse, bounced off the Albemarle's armor and landed back on the deck of the Miami, where its explosion killed him. Brigadier General Henry W. Wessells, commanding the garrison at Plymouth, North Carolina, noted: "In the death of this accomplished sailor the Navy has lost one of its brightest ornaments..."

Flusser was interred at the military cemetery in New Bern, but in 1868 his remains were transferred to the Naval Academy Cemetery.

== Namesakes ==
Four United States Navy ships have been named USS Flusser in his honor.
