= William D. Gregory =

American sea captain (1825–1904)

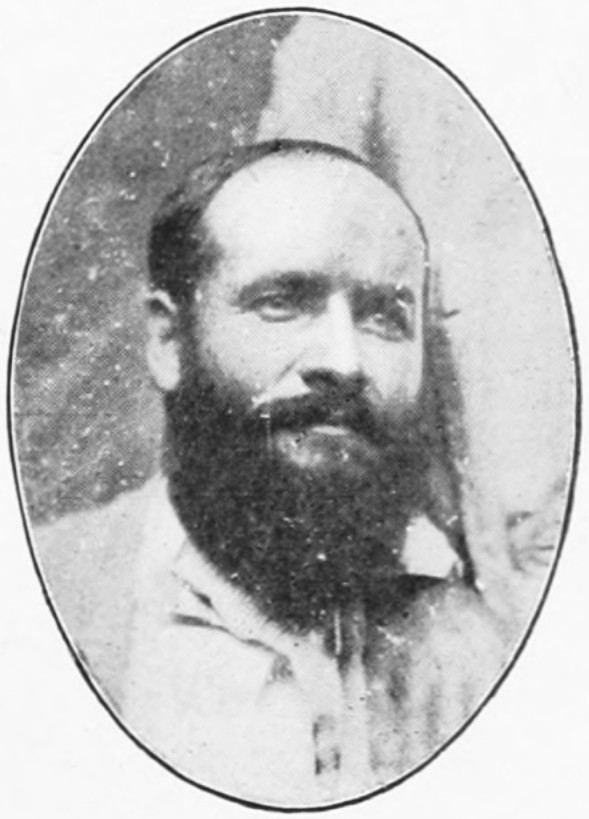
- Born: December 31, 1825; Marblehead, Massachusetts, US
- Died: August 14, 1904 (aged 78); Marblehead, Massachusetts, US
- Occupation: Shipmaster
- Years active: c. 1840–1866

William Doliber Gregory (December 31, 1825 – August 14, 1904) was an American sea captain born in Marblehead, Massachusetts. Gregory was captain of the clipper ship Tejuca from her 1854 completion to her foundering and sinking in an 1856 hurricane; Gregory and most of his crew were rescued only at the last moment by the courageous intervention of a passing ship. Gregory was later commander of the bark Albers, and in 1857 is said to have put down a riot on his ship virtually singlehanded.

With the outbreak of the American Civil War in April 1861, Gregory took a temporary commission in the United States Navy and was given command of the brig USS Bohio. Bohio under Gregory's command took a number of prizes, the most remarkable example of which involved a ruse to disguise his vessel as a steamship in order to deceive the enemy into surrendering.

After resigning from the Navy, Gregory struggled to find a new command due to the exigencies of war. His last voyage as a mariner was reportedly made in 1866.

== Life and career ==
William Doliber Gregory was born on December 31, 1825, in Marblehead, Massachusetts, to John H. Gregory, a shipmaster, and his wife Tabitha (née Bowden). William was one of seven sons from the union, at least five of whom would become sea captains like their father, and three of whom—Samuel, Michael and William—would have notable seafaring careers.

Gregory began his career as a sailor in about 1840, at the age of fifteen, eventually working his way up to the rank of captain. In 1849 he was a crew member of the bark Lucia Maria of Salem, Massachusetts, on a voyage bound for Zanzibar, Tanzania. While still in his early twenties, he supervised the construction of the clipper ship Sunny South, built in 1850, which his older brother Michael would captain.

=== Tejuca (1854–1856) ===
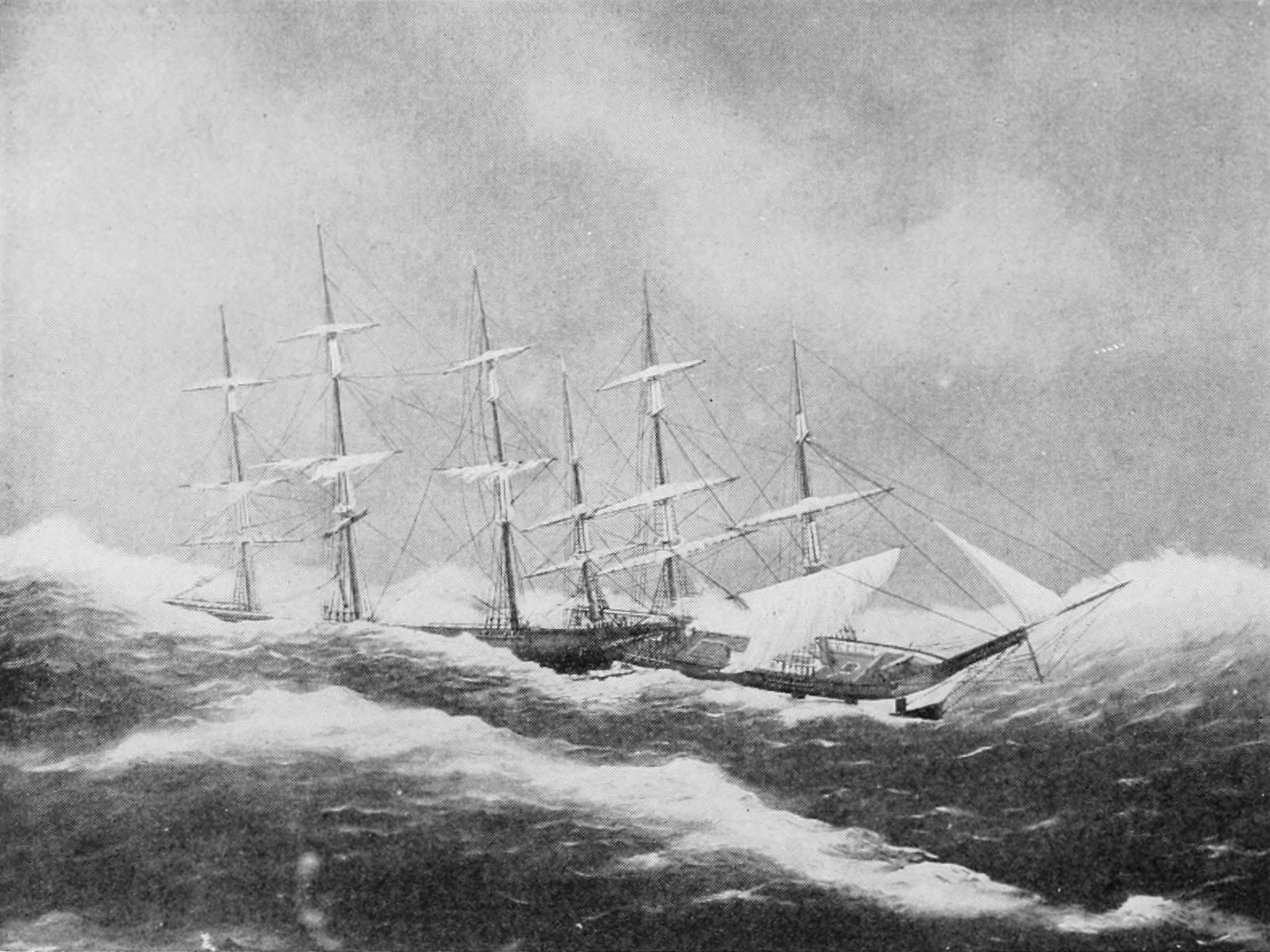
Rescue of Gregory and the crew of Tejuca in 1856

In 1854, Gregory supervised construction of the 470-ton clipper ship Tejuca, (Note: Lindsey refers to Tejuca as a bark, but all contemporaneous sources describe her as a ship (see newspaper articles below) and the sole illustration of the vessel—the painting by Thomas Pitman (see above)—shows her to be ship-rigged.) which was built in Hoboken, New Jersey, by Isaac C. Smith & Son. Gregory took command after the ship's completion, and would remain her master throughout her brief career.

Tejuca was built for the coffee trade, and between June 1854 and July 1855 she made three round trips between New York City and Rio de Janeiro, Brazil, returning via Bahia, Brazil, on each occasion with about 5,000 bags of coffee. On the second such trip, she reportedly made "one of the quickest passages on record" between Rio and New Orleans, Louisiana. Her last voyage to Rio returned with a cargo of sugar, arriving New York on December 7.

On December 27, 1855, Tejuca set out from New York on her first attempted transatlantic crossing, with a cargo of sugar bound for Queenstown, Ireland. A few days out, on January 5, the ship ran into what Gregory later described as a "terrible hurricane". At midnight, Tejuca shipped a sea which rolled the vessel almost on her beam ends, broke most of the yards, and destroyed or swept away everything on deck including the lifeboats, the seawater also contaminating the crew's food stores and drinking water.

By the 7th, with no provisions and the ship settling fast, Gregory and his crew had abandoned hope of survival when a sail appeared on the horizon, belonging to the ship Excelsior. Excelsior's captain, Eben Mitchell, attempted to come to Tejuca's aid, but was unable to launch lifeboats in the raging storm. He finally decided on the hazardous tactic of bringing his ship alongside the stricken vessel, an act which would risk the safety of his own vessel. The maneuver proved successful, and most of Tejuca's crew were able to leap to safety, except for one man who lost his footing and was crushed between the two vessels. Gregory himself almost fell, but was pulled aboard Excelsior by a member of his crew.

In addition to the loss of the ship, Gregory also lost "a very valuable collection of interesting and valuable articles, the accumulations of many years" in the disaster. He later wrote a testimonial praising the courage of Mitchell and his crew, and Mitchell was subsequently awarded for gallantry for the rescue by an association of shipmasters.

=== Albers (1857–1861) ===
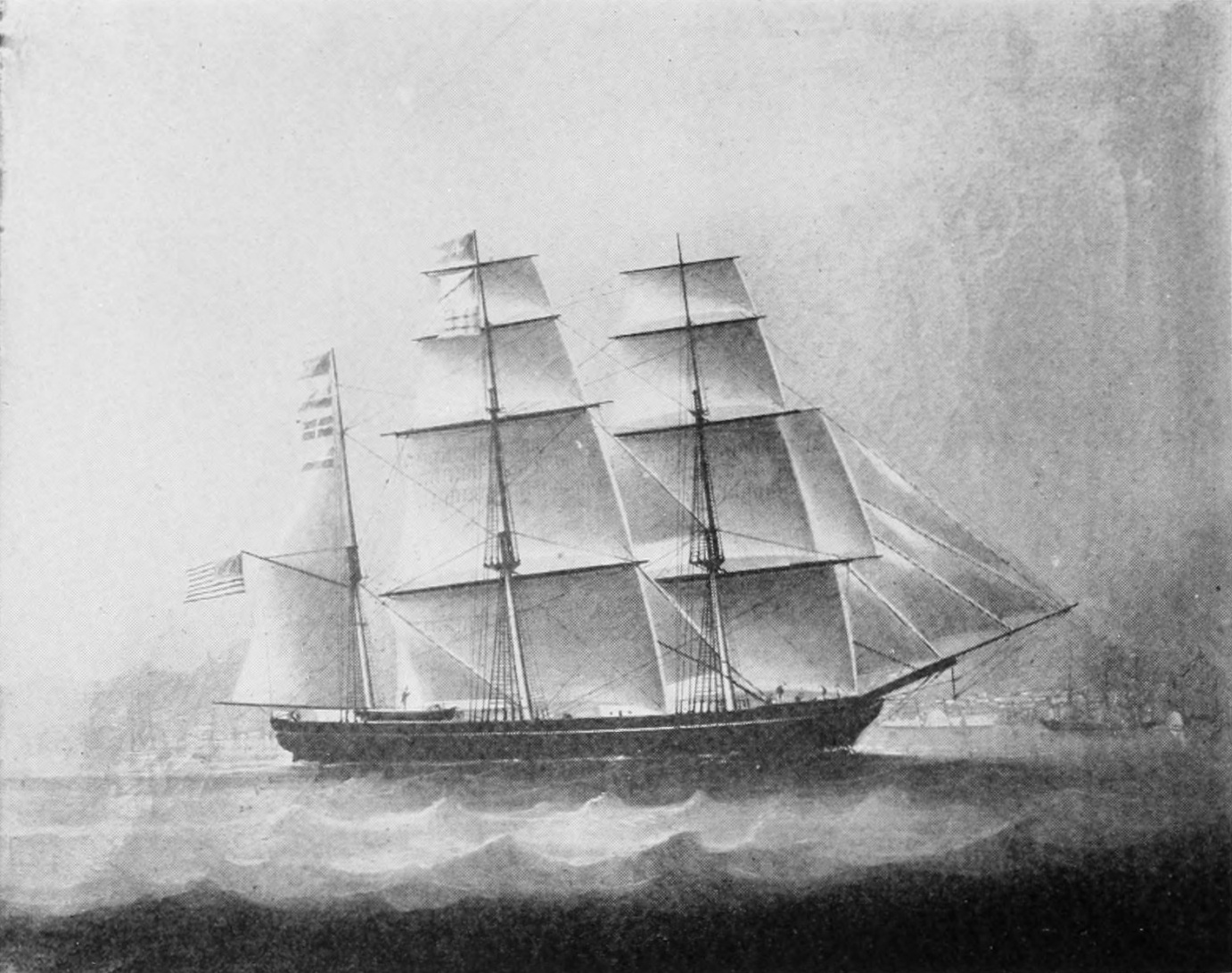
The bark Albers

Following the loss of Tejuca, Gregory assumed command in 1857 of the 360-ton bark Albers, built in Topsham, Massachusetts, in 1844, and owned by Bush & Wilder of Boston. Taking charge of the vessel at that city, Gregory sailed her to Charleston, South Carolina, then to Buenos Aires, Argentina; Montevideo, Uruguay; and Patagonia, before returning to Baltimore. From there, he took the ship to China via Hong Kong, where she was sold for $4,000 (equivalent to $143,000 in 2025); he nonetheless remained in command. His next port of call with Albers was Whampoa, "where he was violently ill", but after recovering he took the vessel on to Canton and Swatow, when she was again sold, with Gregory again remaining in command. In September 1860, Albers departed Sigua with a cargo of rice bound for Manila. Here Gregory left the vessel and returned to San Francisco in another ship, arriving April 4, 1861.

An anecdote from Gregory's service on Albers appeared in an article printed decades later in The Boston Globe. According to the article, Gregory had been obliged to hire a new crew at the port of Macau during his 1857 voyage. On the advice of the American consul, he paid the crew in advance, but he later heard that his new crew included a number of men known for jumping ship with their wages.

While sharing a meal with the new owner of Albers at the latter's residence, Gregory received word that the crew were running wild aboard ship. Hurrying back to the vessel, Gregory caught one crew member attempting to swim ashore, and dragged him back aboard. Arriving on deck, he found other crew members "running about brandishing knives", while the mate and a loyal shipmate were at a loss to stop them. The Globe describes what occurred next:

Capt. Gregory was armed with a stout cane, and as he stepped on the deck began knocking the rioters down, right and left. Then he went at them with his fists, fighting so effectually that order was soon restored. The ship was taken down the stream, and the voyage to Manila, thence to Hong Kong, was made without further trouble.

Not long after Gregory's return to the United States, his employers, Bush & Wilder, purchased a new ship for him to take on another voyage to China. Before he could do so however, the United States Navy requisitioned the vessel for service in the American Civil War which had recently broken out, thus depriving him of his new command.

=== Naval service (1861–1862) ===
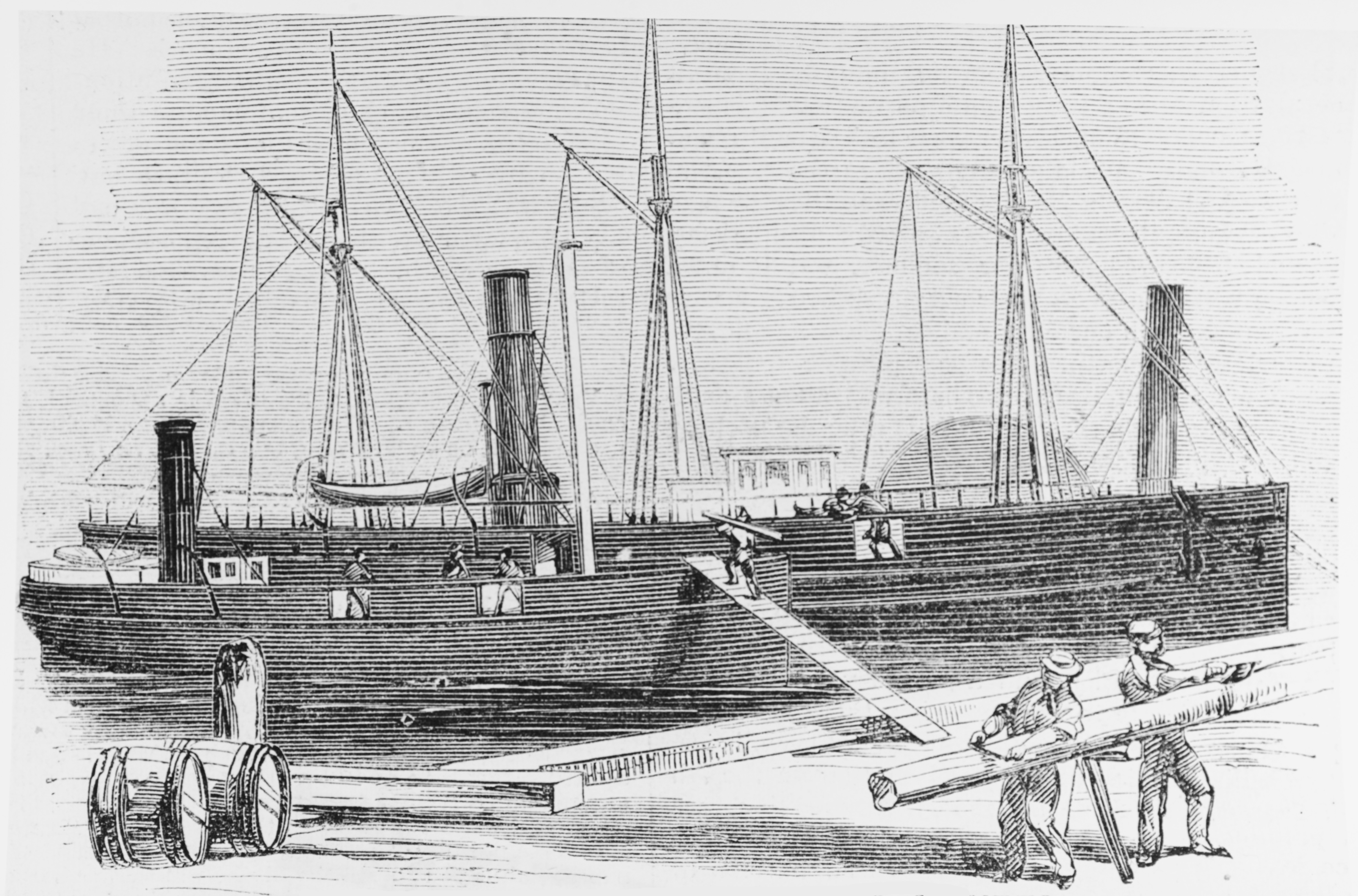
E. B. Hale and Stars and Stripes fitting out at the New York Navy Yard, 1861

With the outbreak of the civil war in April 1861, the United States Navy needed to undertake a rapid expansion, despite having lost many officers to the newly formed Confederate States of America. To address the critical shortage of personnel, the Navy created temporary commissions, enabling volunteers from the merchant marine to become naval officers with little or no additional training. In the autumn of 1861, William Gregory and his brothers Michael and Samuel all volunteered for, and received, such commissions.

==== Dismissal and reinstatement, 1861 ====
William Gregory was quickly given command of the steam gunboat USS E. B. Hale, with the rank of Acting Master, while his older brother Samuel joined him on the same vessel with the rank of Master's Mate. No sooner had the two men been appointed to these posts, however, than they were both summarily dismissed from the Navy without explanation. After making inquiries, William and Samuel discovered that some political opponents in their home town of Marblehead had preferred charges of disloyalty against them to the Secretary of the Navy, Gideon Welles.

Returning home, the two brothers organized "a large and enthusiastic meeting" of the town's residents at Lyceum Hall, where resolutions were adopted condemning the charges against the two as false, and expressing confidence in their loyalty to the nation. The brothers then returned to Washington, D.C., with both a record of the meeting and a petition "signed by nearly every legal voter in Marblehead"; they were quickly reinstated to the service, with William being given command of the armed brig USS Bohio, effective October 3, 1861, and Samuel command of the steam gunboat USS Western World.

==== USS Bohio (1862) ====
Bohio was subsequently assigned to the West Gulf Blockading Squadron in the Gulf of Mexico, and departed January 1, 1862. Arriving off the coast of Louisiana, Bohio sighted and gave chase on February 7 to a schooner sailing under the British flag. On catching the vessel, she was discovered to be the Confederate schooner Eugenie Smith, bound for Matamoras from Havana, Cuba, (Note: Neither source clarifies which Matamoras the vessel was bound for.) with a "valuable cargo" of coffee, soap, dry goods and other items. Her officers and crew were taken prisoner, and the captured vessel placed in the hands of a prize-master, who sailed her to the U.S. District Court at Key West, Florida.

Bohio proceeded on to the Southwest Pass, at the mouth of the Mississippi River, arriving March 7. Here, Gregory received intelligence that a "suspicious-looking" schooner flying the British flag had been recently hailed in the vicinity by a US Navy ship, but allowed to proceed because her papers seemed to be in order. Gregory requested and received permission to pursue the vessel, and at 11 pm set sail on an interception course.

At 5 am the next morning, Bohio sighted the vessel, but the latter immediately set all sails to evade her pursuer, and a chase ensued. Finding after some hours that he was unable to gain on the other ship, Gregory devised a ruse by which he hoped to deceive her captain. He had his crew erect a 12-foot length of stovepipe, fastened to some barrels on deck, to resemble a smokestack. Sand was placed in the bottom barrel to protect the deck, and a fire was then started in the stovepipe "with bits of rope, old junk, tar and other materials" to create smoke. Simultaneously, he had the crew constantly wet the sails to increase Bohio's speed. Seeing Bohio gaining on his ship, and the smoke coming from the stovepipe, the captain of the fleeing vessel was deceived into thinking that Bohio was a steamship; concluding that the race was futile, he hove to at about 2 pm and surrendered. The vessel turned out to be the Confederate schooner Henry Travers.

Bohio took several other prizes while under the command of Gregory. On 13 May, the schooner Deer Island was captured in Mississippi Sound with a cargo of flour and rice. On June 21, Bohio captured the sloop L. Rebecca bound from Biloxi, Mississippi, to Mobile, Alabama, and on June 27, the brig captured the sloop Wave on its way from Mobile to Mississippi City with a cargo of flour. Not long after, Gregory resigned his commission, reportedly due to some ill feeling between himself and some of the other officers.

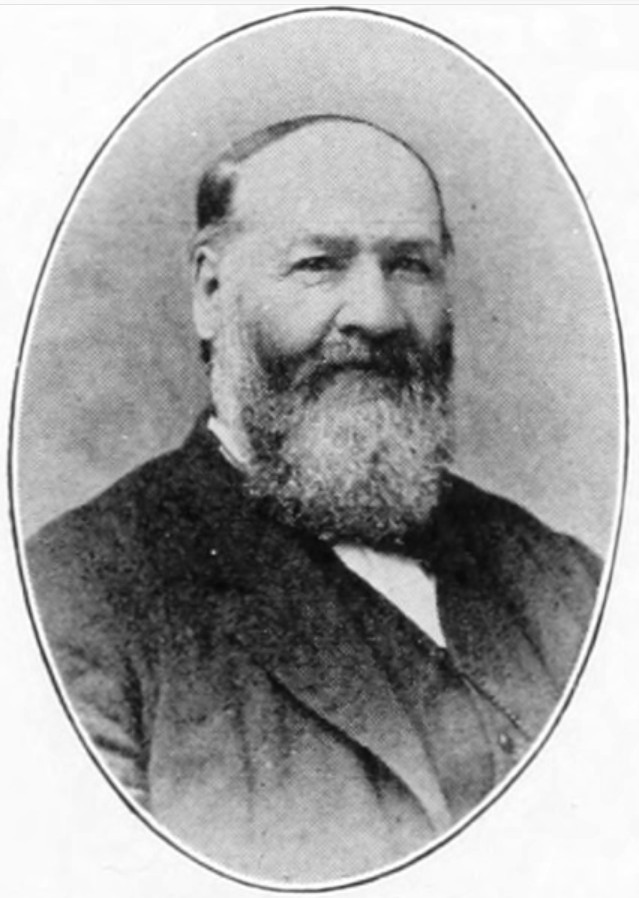
Gregory in later life

=== Later life and career ===
After leaving the Navy, Gregory spent some time "with his brother Augustus in Catalina Island", California. He eventually returned home as mate aboard the mammoth clipper Great Republic, as he was unable to secure a command of his own due to the exigencies of the war. His last voyage as a mariner was in 1866, as chief mate of the Argentinian ship Panama, bound for Buenos Aires.

=== Personal details ===
Gregory married Deborah Anne Thayer at Marblehead on 3 September 1848, when she was 18. The couple had five children: William Chisholm (1848–1923), Annie (1854–1920), Michael B. (1857–1865), Adeline Maria (1859–1869) and Maria L. (1867–1876). Gregory's wife died in 1868, and he never remarried.

Gregory was a Freemason. He died on 19 August 1904 at the age of 78. He and the other members of his immediate family are buried in the family plot in Waterside Cemetery, Marblehead.
