= USS Samuel Rotan =

Gunboat of the United States Navy

History

United States
- Name: USS Samuel Rotan
- Laid down: Not known
- Launched: Date unknown
- Acquired: 21 September 1861; at Philadelphia, Pennsylvania
- Commissioned: 12 November 1861; at Philadelphia, Pennsylvania
- Decommissioned: 10 June 1865; at the New York Navy Yard
- Stricken: 1865 (est.)
- Fate: Sold, 15 August 1865

General characteristics
- Type: Schooner
- Displacement: 212 tons
- Length: 110 ft (34 m)
- Beam: 28 ft 6 in (8.69 m)
- Draft: 9 ft (2.7 m)
- Depth of hold: 7 ft 6 in (2.29 m)
- Propulsion: Sail
- Complement: 29
- Armament: 2 × 32-pounder guns

USS Samuel Rotan was a schooner acquired by the Union Navy during the American Civil War. She was outfitted by the Union Navy as a gunboat to patrol navigable waterways of the Confederacy to prevent the South from trading with other countries. Prior to the war, the US Navy had mostly large, deep-draft, oceangoing vessels. The establishment of the Union blockade required small, fast, shallow-draft vessels like the Samuel Rotan for littoral operations.

== Purchased at Philadelphia in 1861 ==
Samuel Rotan, a wooden, center-board, two-masted coastal merchant schooner, was purchased by Admiral Samuel Francis Du Pont of the US Navy at Philadelphia, Pennsylvania, on 21 September 1861 for $11,000. She was fitted out as a gunboat at the Philadelphia Navy Yard; and commissioned there on 12 November 1861, Acting Master (equivalent to modern Lieutenant Junior grade) John A. Rogers in command.

== Battery Evolution ==
As more weapons became available, her battery was increased.

- October 31, 1861: 2 32-pounders; 57 cwt
- December 28, 1861: 1 24-pounder Dahlgren howitzer added
- February 11, 1863: 1 30 pounder Dahlgren Rifle and 2 32 pounders 57 cwt
- December 31, 1863: added to the preceding: 1 24 pounder howitzer
- December 31, 1864: Add to that of Dec 31, 1863: 1 30 pounder Parrott rifle.

== Civil War service ==
=== Assigned to the Gulf Blockading Squadron ===
Assigned to the Gulf Blockading Squadron, the schooner arrived off Fort Pickens, Florida, on 16 December 1861 and sent to Ship Island, Mississippi. She reported as a gunboat tender to the USS Colorado) at the SW Pass of the Mississippi River on 28 December. Commander T Bailey of the Colorado added a 24-pounder howitzer to her and assigned her to blockade Barataria Bay.

On 9 January 1862, she sailed to West Bay, Texas, and used her two boats to conduct a reconnaissance of the bayou there on the 10th, 11th and 12th. The shore party also destroyed some telegraph lines, as reported by Acting Master Rogers.

She then performed blockade duty off the Mississippi River passes in conjunction with the USS Colorado and was reported being there on 23 January.

=== Reassigned to the East Gulf Blockading Squadron ===
On 20 January 1862, Secretary of the Navy Gideon Welles, on splitting naval jurisdiction in the Gulf of Mexico between Flag Officers William McKean and David Farragut, assigned Samuel Rotan to the former for service in the East Gulf Blockading Squadron. However, other events would delay her reporting.

On 23 Jan 1862, she captured Confederate privateer, Calhoun, by forcing her to run aground in East Bay, formed by the Southwest-Pass and Grand-Pass fingers of the Mississippi Delta. The prize had been attempting to slip into the Southwest Pass laden with over 25 tons of gunpowder, rifles, chemicals, coffee, and other assorted cargo needed by the Confederacy.

The Calhoun was pressed into Federal Service and the prize cargo and papers taken aboard the Samuel Rowan which was dispatched from Ship Island on 18 February to deliver them to the prize court in Philadelphia. Judge John Cadwalader ruled that the proceeds of the prize be shared by both the Rotan and the Colorado. The prize was deemed to be worth $16,531, and after court costs, $14,412.40 was sent to the Treasury Department, where half would be placed into the Navy Pension Fund and half would be distributed amongst the crew members of the two ships.

On March 28, she was dispatched from Philadelphia to report to Key West, Florida, under the command of Acting Master John A Rogers. As she had the prize master from the Colorado on board, she needed to rendezvous with her off the Mississippi first.

Acting Master J.D. Barclay took command on April 4. As the USS 'Colorado drew too much water to navigate the Mississippi, the Samuel Rotan was separated and dispatched to protect David Dixon Porter's mortar schooner fleet at the forthcoming Battle of Forts Jackson and St. Philip where she is pictured in a Harper's Weekly drawing of that fleet.

The schooner then joined her new squadron at Key West at the end of April. She was dispatched to blockade the Indian River on April 28 and St. Andrews Bay on May 14. Acting Volunteer Lieutenant W.W Kennison was given command on July 6 after heroic action as a gun captain when the USS Cumberland was sunk by the ironclad in Hampton Roads that previous March. (The destroyer USS Kennison was later named for him.)

Into the autumn, she blockaded the Florida coast, primarily off St. Andrews Bay and later Tampa Bay. The New York Times reported her in Key West on November 3, 1862

She sailed from Key West on 16 November for badly needed repairs in the Philadelphia Navy Yard.

=== North Atlantic Blockade duty ===
In January 1863, Samuel Rotan joined the North Atlantic Blockading Squadron and was ordered to the York River for blockade duty. Officers were Acting-Volunteer-Lieutenant, W. W. Kennison; Acting-Master's Mates, Thos. Moore, C. H. Packer and D. M. Gaskins. On February 20, she took part in the capture of the schooner General Taylor. On the morning of 24 April, she and USS Western World captured schooners, Martha Ann and A. Carson, off Horn Harbor, Virginia.

On 2 July, she took 35-ton schooner, Champion, off the mouth of the Piankatank River. On 24 July, Lt Commander Gillis reported "the blockade running in Mobjack Bay has been effectively stopped by placing the schooner Samuel Rowan at the mouth of the York River."

On the 27th, her picket boat seized a canoe which had run the blockade from the Severn River, Virginia, laden with corn, chickens, and eggs. On 10 October, her picket boat chased a yawl standing up the beach of Horn Harbor, Virginia. Its occupants jumped overboard and fled to the beach. Then the Southerners fired upon the Union sailors who came up and took possession of the little prize and its cargo of salt.

Soon thereafter, the schooner's need for repairs became serious, and she proceeded to the Norfolk Navy Yard for the work.

Late in January 1864, she was back on blockade duty off the west coast of Chesapeake Bay, and she continued this duty into the autumn. Then she was transferred to the James River to help support General U.S. Grant's operations against Richmond, Virginia, in the Petersburg Campaign. Early in December 1864, she was back off the York River and served in that area into the spring of 1865.

== End-of-war decommissioning and sale ==
On April 15, under the command of Acting Ensign J.W. Willard, she was ordered to duty as a guard ship at Hampton Roads. On May 15 she sailed north for inactivation under Gideon Welles' order of 2 May 1865; and she was decommissioned at the New York Navy Yard on 10 June 1865. The schooner was sold there by Burdett, Jones & Company on 15 August 1865 to a Mr. Stannard for $8,200. Stannard was in the business of scrapping old ships for their materials, and this was probably the fate of the Rotan.
