= James H. Brown =

James H. Brown may refer to:

- James Brown (ecologist) (born 1942), American biologist and academic
- James H. Brown (judge) (1818–1900), Justice of the Supreme Court of Appeals of West Virginia
- James H. Brown (politician) (born 1940), Secretary of State of Louisiana from 1980 to 1988 and Insurance Commissioner of Louisiana from 1991 to 2000
- James Harmon Brown, American television writer with Barbara Esensten
- James Brown (sailor) (1826–1905), American sailor who fought in the American Civil War
- James Harvey Brown (1906–1995), city council member in Los Angeles, California
