= James Brown (sailor) =

Medal of Honor recipient, born 1826

- Civil War era Navy Medal of Honor
- Born: c. 1826; Rochester, New York, US
- Military career
- Allegiance: United States
- Branch: Union Navy
- Rank: Quartermaster
- Awards: Medal of Honor

James Brown (c. 1826 – ) was an officer in the United States Navy who served as quartermaster aboard the USS Albatross during the American Civil War. He received his nation's highest award for bravery during combat, the U.S. Medal of Honor, for his actions aboard ship during the Union Navy's May 4, 1863 attack on Fort DeRussy in an attempt to disrupt the hold by Confederates over the Red River region of Louisiana. That award was conferred on April 16, 1864.

== Formative years ==
Brown was born in Rochester, New York, in 1826.

== Civil War ==
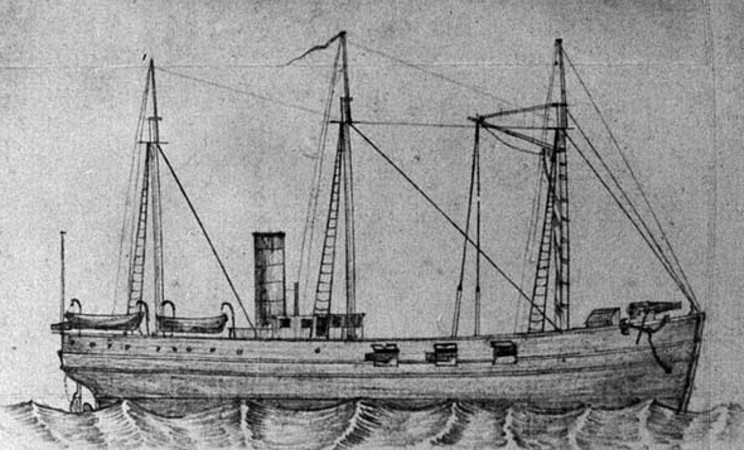
USS Albatross near Mobile, Alabama, September 1863 (William M. C. Philbrick, illustrator).

Brown enlisted in the U.S. Navy during the American Civil War. In 1863, he was serving as quartermaster aboard the 378-ton, screw-propelled wooden gunboat USS Albatross during the U.S. Navy's attack on Fort DeRussy, Louisiana on May 4. Despite sustaining heavy enemy fire that day, which included the projection of a ball from a 32-pound cannon through the wheelhouse of the Albatross which blew off the ship's wheel and exposed the ship's relieving tackles, the ship's officers and enlisted men were still able to capture the fort's heavy works and inflict serious damage on two Confederate steamships, the CSS Grand Duke and Mary T. For his efforts that day, which involved operating the relieving tackles under withering fire in order to move his ship out of harm's way, Brown was later awarded the U.S. Medal of Honor. The award of Brown's Medal of Honor was announced via General Order No. 32 on April 16, 1864:

Awarding medals of honor to—

- J. K. L. Duncan, orindary seaman, Fort Hindman.
- Hugh Melloy, orindary seaman, Fort Hindman.
- Wm. P. Johnson, landsman, Fort Hindman.
- Bartlett Laffey, seaman, Petrel.
- Jas. Stoddard, seaman, Marmora.
- Wm. J. Franks, seaman, Marmora.
- Richard Seward, paymaster's steward, Commodore.
- Christopher Nugent, orderly sargeant Marines, Fort Henry.
- James Brown, quartermaster, Albatross.
- William Moore, boatswain's mate, Benton.
- William P. Brownell, cockswain, Benton.
- John Jackson, ordinary seaman, C. P. Williams (*Awarded under an erroneous report—not entitled to it)
- William Talbot, captain forecastle, Louisville.
- Richard Stout, landsman, Isaac Smith.
- Geo W. Leland, gunner's mate, Lehigh.
- Thos. Irving, cockswain, Lehigh.
- Horatio N. Young, seaman, Lehigh.
- William William, landsman, Lehigh.
- Frank S. Gile, landsman, Lehigh.
- Michael Huskey, fireman, Carondelet.
- John Dorman, seaman, Carondelet.
- William Farley, boatswain's mate, Marblehead.
- Chas. Moore, landsman, Marblehead.
- James Miller, quartermaster, Marblehead.
- Robert Blake (colored), powder boy, Marblehead.

After receiving the Medal of Honor, Brown was promoted to the rank of Acting Master's Mate and later to Acting Ensign.

His life after the Civil War is unknown.

== Medal of Honor citation ==
Served on board the U.S.S. Albatross during action against Fort De Russy in the Red River Area on May 4, 1863. After the steering wheel and wheel ropes had been shot away by rebel fire, Brown stood on the gun platform of the quarterdeck, exposing himself to a close fire of musketry from the shore, and rendered invaluable assistance by his expert management of the relieving tackles in extricating the vessel from a perilous position, and thereby aided in the capture of Fort De Russy's heavyworks

== See also ==
- List of American Civil War Medal of Honor recipients: A–F
- USS Albatross
