= USS Eugenie =

Tender of the United States Navy

History

United States
- Acquired: 7 February 1862 (by capture)
- In service: 22 April 1862
- Out of service: November 1864
- Fate: Sold, November 1864

General characteristics
- Displacement: 150 tons
- Propulsion: sail
- Armament: one gun

USS Eugenie was a captured Confederate schooner acquired by the Union Navy from the prize court during the American Civil War. She was put into service by the Union Navy to guard the Union-controlled port of Key West, Florida.

The sailing ship Eugenie Smith was captured on 7 February 1862 by the brig USS Bohio, commanded by William D. Gregory, near the mouth of the Mississippi River as she attempted to run the blockade. Dispatched to Key West, Florida, for condemnation by the prize court, she was bought by the Navy and renamed Eugenie on 22 April 1862. She was fitted out as a guard ship for the port at Key West, Florida, and placed in the command of Acting Master S. F. Holbrook. She continued as the guard ship until sold in November 1864.
