= Tejuca =

Clipper ship

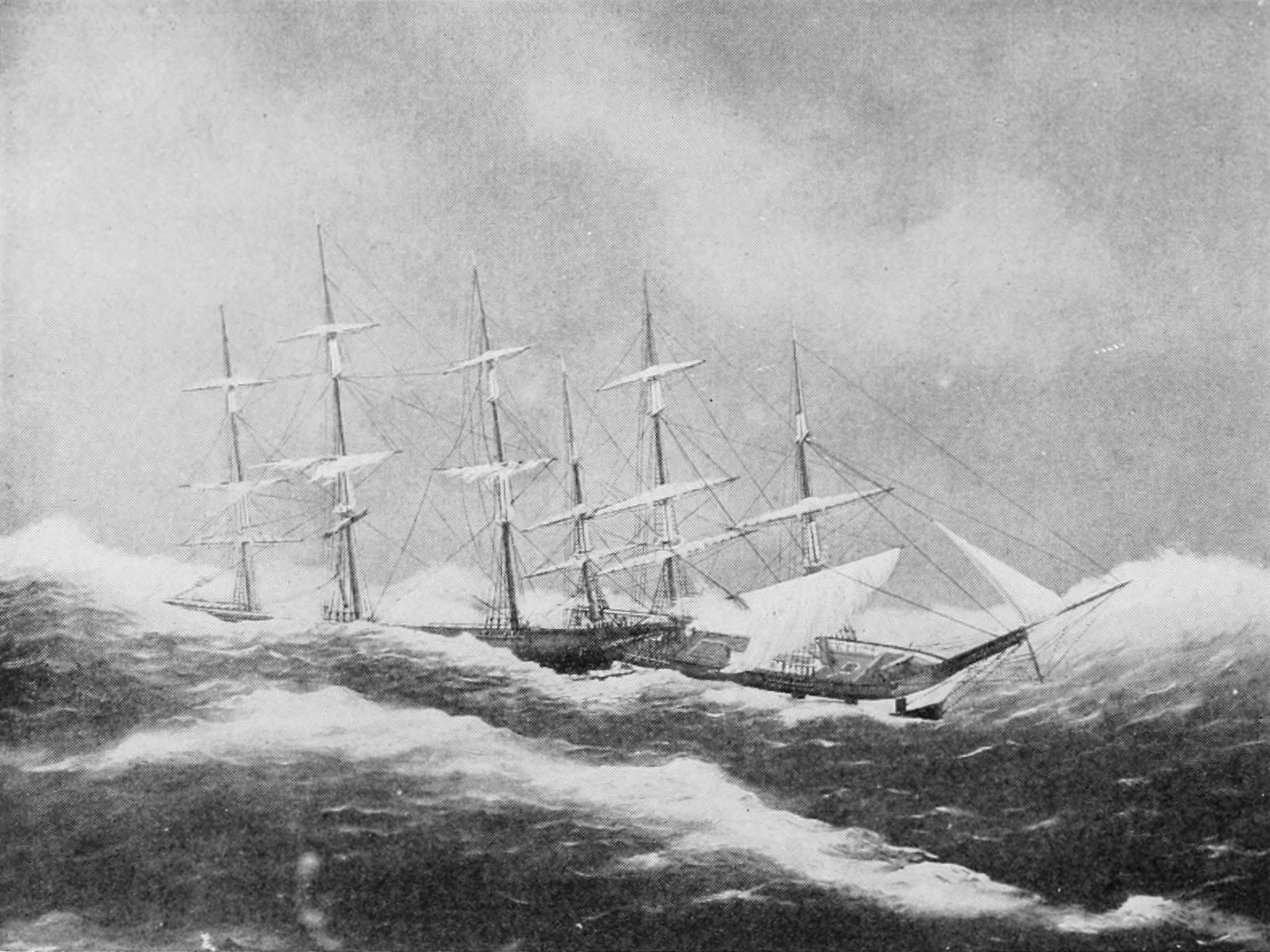
- Rescue of Tejuca's crew by Excelsior (right), 1856

History
- Name: Tejuca
- Namesake: Tijuca, Rio de Janeiro, Brazil
- Owner: Napier, Johnson & Co.
- Builder: Isaac C. Smith & Son (Hoboken, NY)
- Launched: 24 May 1854
- Maiden voyage: 15 June 1854
- Fate: Sunk by hurricane in mid-Atlantic, 7 January 1856

General characteristics
- Type: Clipper ship
- Tonnage: 470 tons
- Length: 140 ft (43 m)
- Beam: 28 ft (8.5 m)
- Depth of hold: 12 ft (3.7 m)
- Propulsion: Sail
- Sail plan: Square rigged
- Crew: 17

Tejuca was a small 470-ton clipper ship built in Hoboken, New Jersey in 1854. After only eighteen months of service, she was lost in a hurricane on the North Atlantic, with most of her crew rescued through a daring maneuver carried out by the ship Excelsior.

Built for South American service, Tejuca spent most of her brief career in the coffee trade between Brazil and the United States, making four round trips between the two countries, including a passage between Bahia and New Orleans in early 1855 that at the time was reportedly one of the fastest on record.

In late December 1855, Tejuca embarked on her first transatlantic crossing, and a few days later ran into a severe hurricane. With the ship badly damaged and in a sinking condition, all but one of her crew were rescued by the ship Excelsior, whose captain risked his own vessel by bringing it alongside Tejuca while the storm still raged. Excelsior's captain later received an award for gallantry for the rescue.

== Construction and design ==
Tejuca, a wood-hulled clipper ship, (Note: Lindsey refers to Tejuca as a bark, a description repeated by Knoblock, but all contemporaneous sources describe her as a ship (see References section below) and the sole illustration of the vessel—the painting by Thomas Pitman (see above)—shows her to be ship-rigged.) was built in 1854 by Isaac C. Smith & Son of Hoboken, New Jersey, for Napier, Johnson & Co., a New York firm. Launched 24 May 1854, Tejuca was built "for the South American trade", (Note: The source erroneously refers to the ship as Tejorca.) and was named after the district of Tijuca (Note: Commonly spelled "Tejuca" in the 19th century.) in Rio de Janeiro, Brazil, then known for its coffee plantations.

Tejuca was 140 feet (43 m) in length, with a beam of 28 feet (8.5 m) and hold depth of 12 feet (3.7 m). Her carrying capacity was 470 tons, and she had some accommodation for passengers. At time of launch, she was described in newspaper reports as a "finely modelled" and "finely proportioned" ship that combined "carrying capacity with qualities for sailing."

Tejuca was to be commanded for the whole of her brief career by William D. Gregory. Her New York agent was Gurdon S. Coit of 106 Wall Street, who was also agent for the clipper Sunny South, skippered by Gregory's brother Michael.

== Service history ==
Tejuca made four round trips between the United States and Brazil from June 1854 to December 1855, usually calling at Rio de Janeiro via Bahia and returning via Bahia to New York, although one return voyage was made to New Orleans. The return cargo on the first three trips was coffee, but the last was made with a cargo of sugar. Tejuca's coffee cargoes typically attracted good prices in the United States as Brazilian coffee was much in demand at this time. The ship's outbound cargoes are not known.

Tejuca departed New York on her maiden voyage June 15, 1854, bound for Rio via Bahia, returning to New York 14 October with two passengers and a consignment of 5,000 bags of coffee for Napier, Johnson & Co. Clearing New York 18 November, Tejuca made a second passage to Rio via Bahia. Departing Rio 5 February, the vessel then completed "one of the quickest passages on record" between that port and New Orleans, where she arrived 14 March with a cargo of 4,541 bags of coffee.

From New Orleans, Tejuca returned for a third time to Rio, departing 25 April and arriving 7 July, before returning via New Orleans to New York, where she arrived early September with 4,834 bags of coffee. Tejuca's final voyage to Brazil was again made to Rio via Bahia, clearing New York 10 September and returning 14 December with a cargo of sugar. On the latter voyage, the ship experienced heavy weather, losing her topgallant mast and having several yards sprung and sails split, while also being "twice blown off the coast."

=== Loss ===
Tejuca's first attempt at a transatlantic crossing was fated to become her final voyage. On 27 December 1855, the ship departed New York for Queenstown, Ireland, with a cargo of sugar. The first few days of the voyage were uneventful, but on the night of 4 January, the ship ran into a "tremendous gale". The following morning, the vessel shipped a sea that damaged the front of the poop deck, allowing water into the hold. After nightfall, the gale developed into a "terrible hurricane", and at midnight, Tejuca shipped another sea which rolled the ship almost on her beam ends, broke most of the yards and destroyed or swept away everything on deck including the lifeboats, and also contaminated the crew's food stores and drinking water.

By the 7th, without provisions and with waves broaching over the deck and the ship "nearly on a level with the water and settling fast", the captain and crew had given up hope of survival when, at about 1 pm, a sail appeared on the horizon, belonging to the ship Excelsior—a small merchant vessel of about the same tonnage as Tejuca. Excelsior's captain, Eben Mitchell of Kennebunk, Maine, had seen Tejuca's plight and determined to aid her crew, in spite of his own vessel having taken a severe battering from the hurricane.

When within range, Mitchell first attempted to launch one or more of his ship's lifeboats, but these were either swamped or dashed against the side of his ship and destroyed:

Nothing then remained for the doomed crew save the desperate expedient of placing the ships alongside. Calling his men aft, [Mitchell] addressed them in the eloquence of earnestness; he pointed out the peril, but he showed them the hope! A hearty cheer told him the gallant fellows would go wherever he led; for the slightest collision in that raging storm must have been fatal to both.

Mitchell, "skilfully watching the lift and fall" of the waves, brought his vessel alongside Tejuca's bow and had his crew throw lines to the stricken vessel, by means of which some of Tejuca's crew were hauled aboard. The two ships then came together closely enough for the remaining crew to leap to the safety of Excelsior's channels, whereupon Mitchell signalled a contingent of his crew—standing by for the purpose—to unfurl the foresail, drawing Excelsior out of danger. All of Tejuca's crew were saved in the operation but one, who lost his footing and was crushed between the two ships; though he too was hauled aboard Excelsior, he died a few hours later from internal injuries.

=== Aftermath ===
After the rescue, Excelsior continued on to her destination of Le Havre, France, where she limped into port on 20 January "almost a wreck herself". Captain Gregory later gave accounts of the rescue to the newspapers, in which he expressed his profound gratitude to Captain Mitchell, his officers and crew for their "noble, perilous and successful exertions" in effecting the rescue and their "humane and benevolent conduct" thereafter. The following May, a group of shipmasters from Mobile, Alabama, presented Captain Mitchell with a "handsome service of plate ... as a testimonial of their appreciation of his gallant conduct in rescuing the crew and officers of the clipper ship Tejuca".

The loss of Tejuca and her cargo was estimated at $80,000 (equivalent to $2,799,704 in 2024). Tejuca was one of 79 American ships lost and over a thousand damaged in the first six months of 1856, described at the time as "a period probably without parallel in our commercial history", with total losses estimated at $15,890,500 (equivalent to $556,108,646 in 2024).
