= William Kennison =

Union Navy officer (1825–1893)

William W. Kennison
- Born: February 28, 1825; Massachusetts, United States
- Died: January 4, 1893 (aged 67)
- Burial place: Mount Auburn Cemetery, Cambridge, Massachusetts
- Military career
- Allegiance: United States of America
- Branch: United States Navy
- Service years: 1861–1868
- Rank: Lieutenant
- Commands: USS Samuel Rotan
- Conflicts: American Civil War

William W. Kennison (1825–1893) was an officer in the United States Navy during the American Civil War.

== Biography ==
Born in Massachusetts, Kennison was appointed Acting Master's Mate on 28 August 1861. On 26 March 1862 he was promoted to Volunteer Lieutenant in recognition of his gallant conduct in the action between the CSS Virginia and the USS Cumberland during the Battle of Hampton Roads on 8 March 1862, in which Kennison was in charge of the forward 10-inch (250 mm) pivot gun. He was subsequently appointed commander of the schooner Samuel Rotan in the North Atlantic Blockading Squadron in 1863, capturing the schooner Champion off the Piankatank River, Virginia, on 2 July, and a large yawl off Horn Harbor, Virginia, with cargo including salt, on 10 October. He later served aboard the steam gunboat South Carolina, involved in operations off Charleston and Savannah in 1865. Following the war, he was honorably discharged on 4 May 1866, but was reappointed Acting Master on 20 August 1866. His final muster out date was 16 November 1868.

== Namesake ==
The destroyer USS Kennison (DD-138) (1918–1945) was named for him.
