= Hurricane (clipper) =

American sailing ship, built 1851

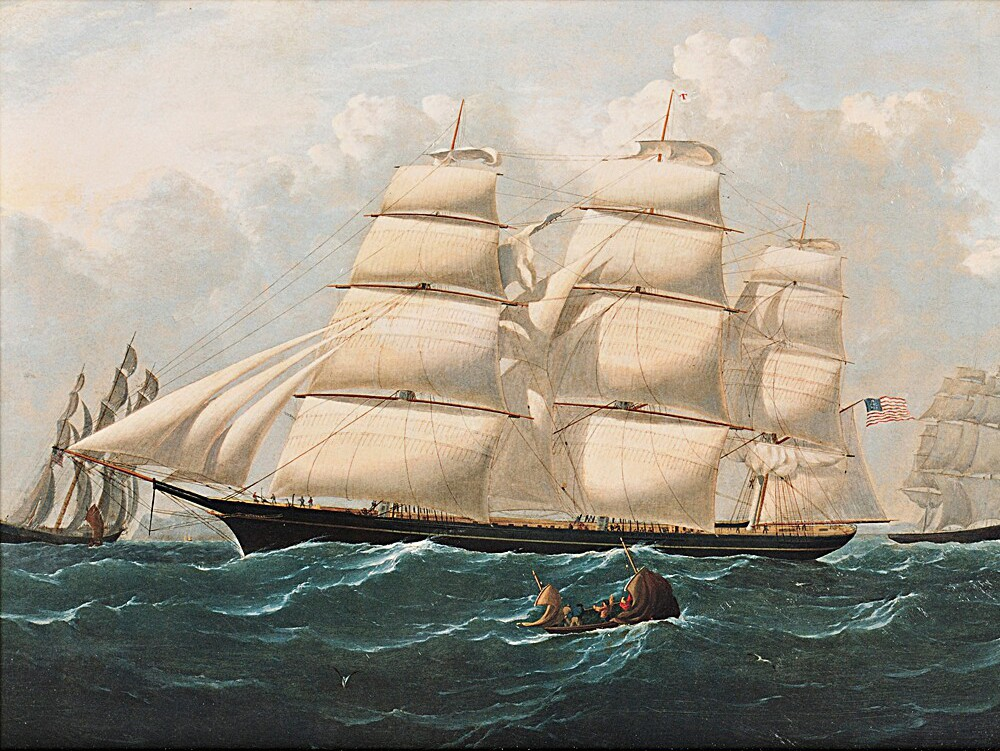
- Hurricane in the English Channel; detail of a lithograph after a painting by Stephen Dadd Skillet

History
- Name: Hurricane
- Owner: C. W. & A. Thomas
- Port of registry: New York, United States (1851–60); Singapore, Straits Settlements (after 1860)
- Builder: Isaac C. Smith (Hoboken, New Jersey)
- Launched: 25 Oct 1851
- Maiden voyage: 17 Dec 1851
- In service: 1851–57; 1859–76?
- Out of service: 1857–58
- Renamed: Shaw-Allum (c. 1860)
- Fate: Unknown; disappears from shipping registers after 1876
- Notes: Reputedly the most extreme clipper ever built Made several record port-to-port or point-to-point passages

General characteristics
- Type: Extreme clipper
- Tons burthen: 1608
- Length: 230 ft (70 m) (oa); 215 ft (66 m) (deck); 206 ft (63 m) (keel)
- Beam: 40 ft (12 m)
- Draft: 20 ft (6.1 m)
- Depth of hold: 22 ft (6.7 m)
- Decks: Two
- Sail plan: Ship-rigged
- Speed: 18 knots (33 km/h) in ideal conditions; typical speed 7–10 knots (13–19 km/h)

Hurricane was a large extreme clipper of 1608 tons burthen built in Hoboken, New Jersey, United States in 1851. Reputedly the most extreme clipper ever built, Hurricane proved a very fast vessel, reportedly capable of speeds of up to 18 knots (33 km/h) in ideal conditions, and establishing a number of record passages in the early years of her career.

Hurricane made a total of four New York–to–San Francisco voyages while under the American flag, the fastest of which was an outstanding 100-day passage in 1854. After arriving at San Francisco, the ship would usually continue on to China or Hong Kong before returning via San Francisco to New York. She also made several voyages between the United Kingdom and India during this period, including two record passages in 1855–1856.

Due partly to an economic depression in the United States, Hurricane was laid up for about a year at New York in 1857–58. In late 1858, she sailed via San Francisco for Singapore, Straits Settlements, where in 1860 she was sold to British interests. Renamed Shaw-Allum, little is known about her subsequent career. Her last entry in shipping registers was in 1876.

== Construction and design ==
Hurricane, an extreme clipper, was built in Hoboken, New Jersey, United States, in 1851 by Isaac C. Smith. The ship was originally referred to in press reports as Yankee Doodle, but was renamed while still under construction. Hurricane was the first clipper built by Smith, and his first time building a fast sizeable ship; she was also by far the largest vessel to come from Smith's Hoboken shipyard. (Note: See Isaac C. Smith § shipbuilding record.) Her owners, C. W. & A. Thomas, (Note: As evidenced by company advertisements, the firm is misnamed C. W. & H. Thomas in the New-York Marine Register, an error consequently duplicated by some later sources.) a firm involved mainly in the importation of French textiles to the United States, are not known to have owned any other notable clippers.

Hurricane was built of live oak, with white oak keel, kelson and frame, and a top made of live oak and locust; her timbers were "thoroughly salted on the stocks." Hurricane's fastenings were of copper and iron, square bolted throughout, and she was said to be an exceptionally heavily timbered and strongly built vessel. She had an overall length of 230 feet (70 m), 215 feet (66 m) on deck and 206 feet (63 m) keel, with a beam of 40 feet (12 m), hold depth of 22 feet (6.7 m) and draft of 20 feet (6.1 m). She had two decks, and was fitted with passenger accommodations in addition to her cargo capacity. Her registered tonnage was 1,608 tons burthen.

According to some authorities, (Note: Both Fairburn and Howe and Matthews state that Hurricane was the most extreme clipper according to "some authorities" without identifying them.) Hurricane was "the sharpest sailing ship ever constructed by any builder"—that is, the most extreme clipper—though her model fore and aft is said to have avoided concave lines. She had a deadrise of 40 inches (100 cm) typical of the early extreme clippers. It was said that no other vessel had lines below water "sweeter than those of the Hurricane, for, in her, resistance to driving through water was reduced to a minimum." (Note: Fairburn provides the quote without identifying the source.) The disadvantage of such sharp lines was a corresponding reduction in cargo capacity, which ran the risk of making the extreme clippers unprofitable during periods of low freight rates. At the time of Hurricane's debut, however, the California Gold Rush was in full swing and rates were still at unprecedented highs.

Hurricane had a "gracefully" rising bow and rounded stern, with a heavy brass rail running around the poop deck. The bow was decorated with an eagle's head, which had a ribbon flowing from its mouth upon which was inscribed the ship's name in gilt letters, the whole creating "a very novel appearance". (Note: Howe and Matthews state that the eagle's head and ribbon decorations were located on the ship's stern rather than bow, contradicting the contemporaneous newspaper account.) Hurricane was loftily sparred and fitted with rolling topsails, with her name emblazoned across the lower part of the foretopsail in large black lettering "that could be read much further than any signals and looked very smart and shipshape." Overall, she was described as a "truly beautiful ship".

=== Launch ===
Hurricane was launched with all her standing spars on the morning of 25 October 1851, witnessed by an "immense concourse" of spectators. After the launch, the vessel "remained afloat several days with nearly all her yards aloft, without a pound of ballast in her", a tribute to her stability.

Hurricane's launch was widely reported across the country, with some seeing the event not merely as the launch of an exceptional ship, but as a symbol of the growing confidence of the young Republic. A reporter from a Washington, D.C., periodical, after noting how the vessel "sparred enormously, looms up prodigiously ... [and] overtops and belittles everything afloat lying near", further reflected that "[t]he tendency in every thing with us is toward magnificence of dimensions ... the day of cheap things is past altogether. Grandeur, speed and magnificence are the ruling ideas in the American mind." Another journalist from North Carolina was sufficiently moved by news of the launch to declare: "We are a great people and Gotham is magnificent." Others confined their admiration to the ship itself. Another North Carolina reporter, writing some weeks after the launch, described the ship "with all her sails and colors flying" as "one of the most cheering nautical sights ever shown in this region".

=== Command ===
Hurricane's first master, who would command the vessel for the first six years of her service, was Captain Samuel Very Jr., son of Salem mariner John Crowninshield Very and father of future United States Navy Rear Admiral Samuel W. Very. Captain Very Jr. would prove to be an effective captain and navigator, under whose command Hurricane would set or equal a number of point-to-point or port-to-port records.

== Service history ==
=== Very captaincy, 1851–57 ===
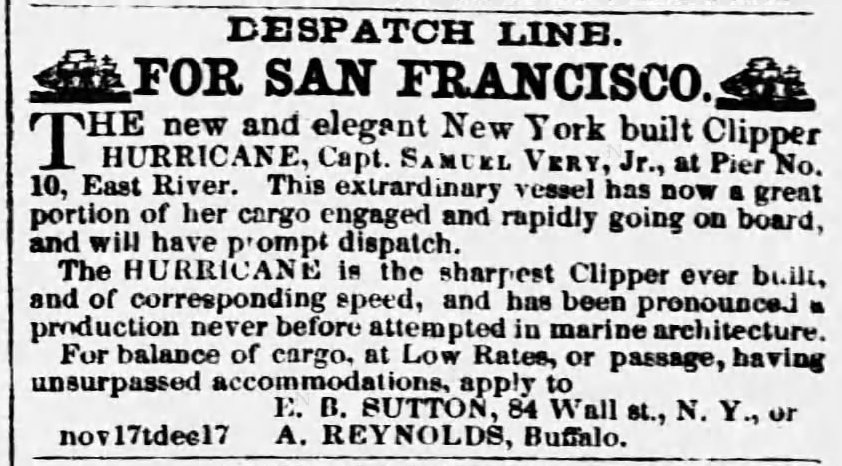
Advertisement for Hurricane's maiden voyage

Prior to Hurricane's launch, a voyage to China via Cape Horn, Chile and San Francisco, California, (Note: All ships travelling between the East and West Coast of the United States during the California gold rush were obliged to travel around Cape Horn as the Panama Canal had not yet been built.) had already been organized for the vessel, and in the days following the ship's completion, she took on cargo and booked passengers. While Hurricane's cargoes are not known, typical goods shipped to California in this period were manufactured goods of all types as well as foodstuffs, all of which were much in demand at the time. Hurricane eventually departed New York for San Francisco on her maiden voyage on 17 December 1851, with Captain Samuel Very Jr. in command.

Sixteen days out from New York, Hurricane's fore and main topmasts and mizzen topgallant mast were lost in a white squall, but despite the mishap, the ship crossed the equator in good time and arrived at Rio de Janeiro, Brazil, on 28 January 1852, where she put in for repairs. These were effected in the space of 12 days—then considered a remarkably short time for this port—and the ship resumed her journey 9 February, reaching the Pacific Ocean 24 days later and enjoying a "fine run" of 18 days to the equator, thence to San Francisco in 24 days, where she arrived 15 April. Hurricane's time on her first New York–to–San Francisco voyage was 120 days overall including the 12-day stopover at Rio, her net sailing days thus totalling just 108, (Note: By way of comparison, the typical voyage on the same route for a sailing ship other than a clipper was in the vicinity of six to seven months (180 to 220 days).) while her run of 66 days from Rio to San Francisco has been described as "only once beaten and only twice equalled" in the history of merchant sail. Hurricane is also said to have travelled 400 nautical miles (740 km) in a single day on the passage from Rio, at times reaching speeds of up to 18 knots (33 km/h), and while this claim has been queried, according to naval architect William Fairburn the vessel was "fully capable" of achieving such speeds in the right conditions.

After making port at San Francisco, Hurricane continued on her scheduled trip to China, returning to San Francisco from Whampoa 20 October after a 43-day transpacific crossing. The ship then made a second transpacific crossing, this time to Hong Kong, in a time of 44 days. Loading again at Whampoa, the vessel cleared port 12 February 1853 for her home port of New York, arriving at her destination 18 May after a passage of 94 1/2 days.

Hurricane departed on her second New York–to–San Francisco voyage on 9 August 1853, and initially made good time. In the vicinity of Cape Horn, however, she was beset by much calm weather, and also lost her jibboom and foretopgallant mast, finally arriving at San Francisco after a 123-day passage. Regardless, her run of 25 days from Sandy Hook to the equator on the outset of this voyage is said to have "never been bettered and seldom equalled for August departures." Hurricane then returned to New York in ballast, clearing San Francisco 31 December and arriving at her destination in early April after a passage of 96 days.

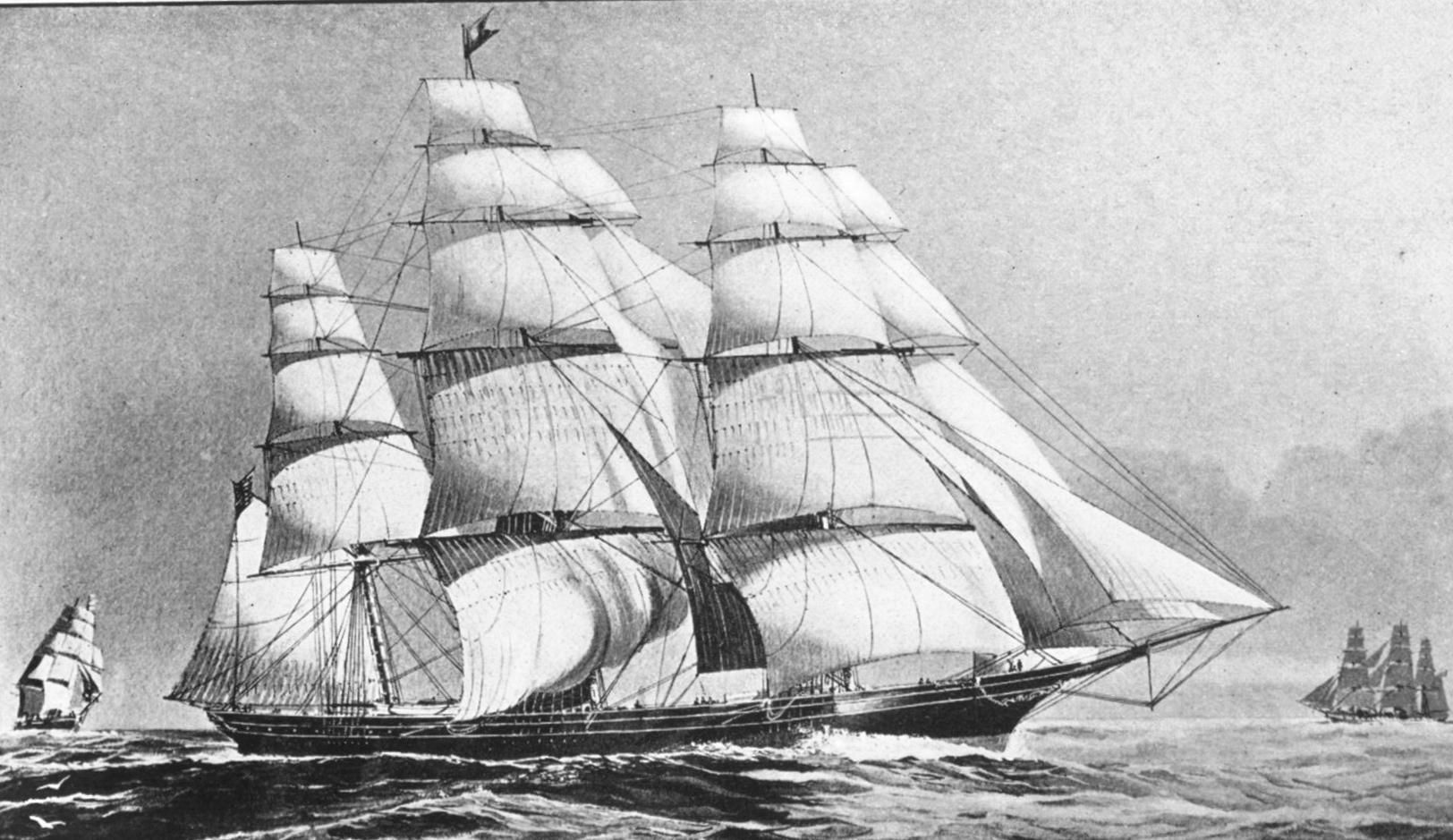
Flying Cloud

Hurricane's third and fastest New York–to–San Francisco voyage began on 26 May 1854. After just 85 days in transit, the ship was only 1,040 miles (1,670 km) from San Francisco and within striking distance of Flying Cloud's all-time record passage of 89 days, but at this point was beset by light winds and calms; it took another two weeks to cover the remaining distance, the ship eventually logging a nonetheless outstanding passage of 100 days (99 days 16 hours pilot to pilot). Captain Very was particularly proud of his ship's performance through the challenging region of the tropics on this voyage, noting that the vessel averaged more than 8 mph (13 km/h) through both the Atlantic and Pacific legs, and recording in his log the conviction that "these two portions of our passage have rarely, if ever, been equalled"; both legs were later established by marine historian Carl C. Cutler as all-time records. Fairburn has additionally noted Hurricane's "unusually uniform" speeds under varying conditions on this passage, and argued that with a little more good fortune, the vessel could well have set considerably faster times throughout her career.

After arriving at San Francisco, Hurricane made a 40-day passage to Hong Kong, departing 21 September and arriving 1 November, before continuing on to Calcutta, India, on a leg which included a very fast passage of 6 1/2 days from Hong Kong to Singapore at an average speed of just under 10 knots (19 km/h). Clearing Calcutta 3 February 1855, the ship made a 100-day passage around the Cape of Good Hope to London, United Kingdom. From London, the vessel returned to Calcutta, on this occasion making the run from The Needles to the mouth of the Hooghly River in 82 1/4 days, setting a record "not beaten or equalled for many years thereafter." Leaving Calcutta 10 January 1856, the ship returned to Falmouth, United Kingdom, in an all-time record of 79 sailing days (83 days total), during which the ship also established an all-time record of 36 days from Calcutta to past the Cape of Good Hope, Cape Colony, before departing from London for Hong Kong, where she arrived 5 October 1856.

After almost four months at Hong Kong, Hurricane sailed for San Francisco 20 January 1857, arriving 13 March. At this point, an unsuccessful attempt was made to sell the vessel. Hurricane eventually sailed from San Francisco 16 June for New York, arriving 28 September 1857 after a 104-day passage. This was the last voyage of Hurricane under the command of Captain Very, whose family returned to New York with him on this passage.

=== Later history ===
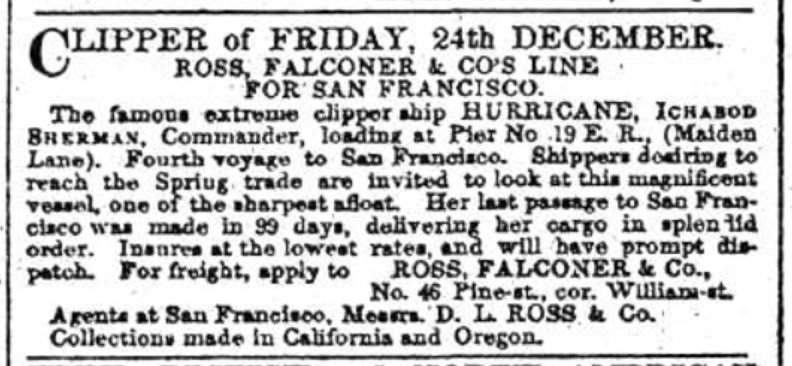
Advertisement for Hurricane's last New York to San Francisco voyage, 1858

After returning to New York in September 1857, Hurricane was laid up with no work until the end of 1858 due to low freight rates caused in part by an economic depression in the United States. While other vessels could continue to operate profitably in such conditions, extreme clippers like Hurricane, with their high labor costs and relatively light tonnages, could not. Toward the end of 1858, Hurricane was again placed in commission—reportedly in hopes of finding a buyer—and on 8 January 1859, departed for the fourth and final time for San Francisco, with Captain Ichabod Sherman in command. On this voyage, Hurricane experienced much adverse weather, arriving at San Francisco 30 May after an unexceptional 143-day passage.

From San Francisco, Hurricane sailed for Singapore 3 September, arriving 7 November. There, she was sold in 1860 for US$30,000 (equivalent to US$1,050,000 in 2024) and went under the British flag. Renamed Shaw-Allum, little is known about the vessel's subsequent career. Her last known mention in shipping registers was in 1876.
