= USS Albatross (1858) =

Gunboat of the United States Navy

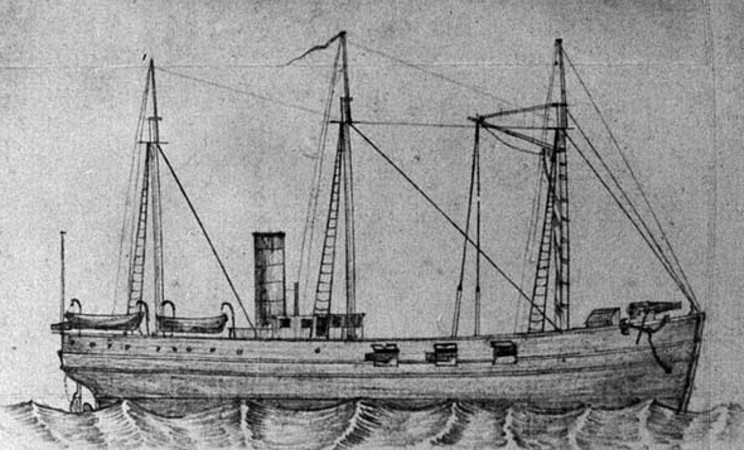
- Sketch of Albatross by William M. C. Philbrick, depicting her off Mobile, Alabama, on 25 September 1863.

History

United States
- Namesake: the bird Albatross
- Launched: 1858 at Mystic, Connecticut
- Acquired: 23 May 1861 at Brooklyn, New York
- Commissioned: 25 June 1861 at the New York Navy Yard
- Decommissioned: 11 August 1865 at the Boston Navy Yard
- Stricken: 1865 (est.)
- Fate: Sold 8 September 1865 at Boston, Massachusetts

General characteristics
- Type: screw steamer
- Tonnage: 378
- Length: 150 ft (46 m)
- Beam: 30 ft (9.1 m)
- Depth of hold: 10 ft (3.0 m)
- Propulsion: steam engine, screw-propelled
- Sail plan: rigged as a three-masted schooner
- Speed: 11 knots (20 km/h; 13 mph)
- Complement: not known
- Armament: 1 × 8 in (200 mm) smoothbore Dahlgren gun; 2 × 32-pounder (15 kg) smoothbore guns

USS Albatross was a screw steamer rigged as a three-masted schooner acquired by the Union Navy during the beginning of the American Civil War. She was outfitted as a gunboat with heavy guns and used in the Union blockade of the waterways of the Confederate States of America.

== Built in Mystic, Connecticut ==
Albatross was built at Mystic, Connecticut in 1858. She was purchased by the Navy at Brooklyn, New York on 23 May 1861, and commissioned at the New York Navy Yard on 25 June 1861, Commander George A. Prentiss in command.

== Civil war operations ==
=== Assigned to the Atlantic blockade ===
Acquired during the Union Navy's efforts to expand the fleet early in the civil war to carry out the blockade of the Confederate coast established by U.S. President Abraham Lincoln's proclamation of 19 April, Albatross was assigned to the Atlantic Blockading Squadron. She soon sailed for the Virginia Capes, and reported to the squadron's commander, Flag Officer Silas Stringham, at Hampton Roads, Virginia on 1 July 1861.

Following a week's service in the Chesapeake Bay along its eastern shore and off the mouth of the Rappahannock River, the steamer rounded Cape Henry on 10 July and proceeded south to waters outside the bar off Hatteras Inlet to assist in sealing off the North Carolina coast. The ship's first action came on 11 July after a Confederate shore battery near Oregon Inlet opened fire on her. She answered with all her guns, knocked out one of the Confederate cannon, and drove the Southern soldiers from the area.

Albatross made her first capture on 18 July, when a party from the steamer boarded and seized the schooner Velasco of Galveston, Texas, which was carrying false papers while sailing under the Lone Star flag from Matanzas, Cuba, with a cargo of sugar. Albatross took the prize to Hampton Roads and turned her over to Flag Officer Stringham on 20 July. The next day, while returning to her station, Albatross exchanged fire with the North Carolina steamer Beaufort lying off Bodie Island and forced the Southern ship to retire through Oregon Inlet to safety in Pamlico Sound.

=== Capturing pirates ===
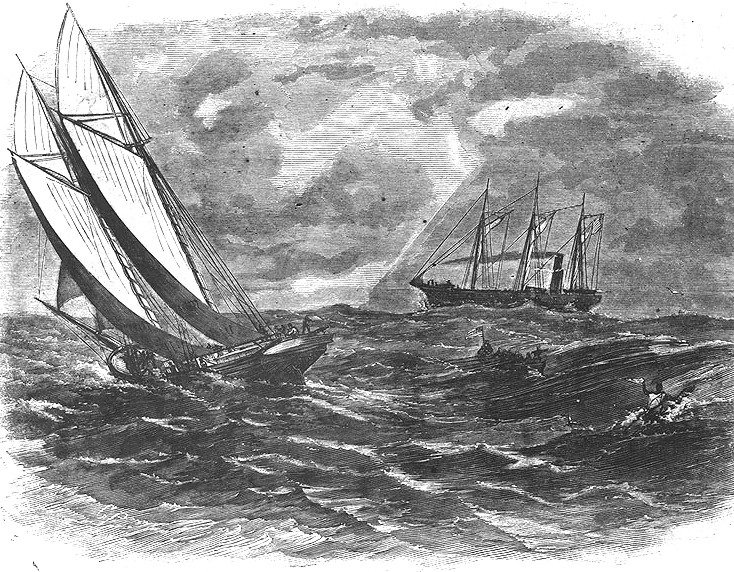
"Recapture of the Schooner Enchantress by the Gun-boat Albatross" (Line engraving published in Harpers Weekly, 1861)

On 22 July 1861, while Albatross was chasing a sailing vessel near Hatteras Inlet, a black man jumped overboard and shouted, "Save me, captain, she's bound to Charleston." While lowering a boat to pick up the man, Albatross turned her guns on the schooner and ordered her to heave to. That vessel, Enchantress, a schooner of Newburyport, Massachusetts, which had been captured on 6 July by Confederate privateer Jefferson Davis, promptly surrendered. Commander Prentiss, considering the five crewmen captured with the schooner to be pirates, had them put in double irons. He placed Master's Mate Tunis D. Wendell in charge of the prize over a crew consisting of five Union sailors and the rescued man who had been on Enchantress when she surrendered to the Southern privateer.

Albatross took the schooner to Hampton Roads where they arrived on 24 July. Since the Union steamer was in need of repairs, Stringham sent the two vessels on to Philadelphia, Pennsylvania. En route north on 1 August, a party from Albatross boarded Elizabeth Ann of Accomac, Virginia and bound from Penns Grove, New Jersey, for Chincoteague, Virginia, and, upon finding her papers to be incorrect, seized that vessel and took her in tow. On 2 August, the three ships reached Philadelphia, Pennsylvania, where the schooners were turned over to the prize court and Albatross entered the shipyard for repairs.

After completion of the machinery work late in the month, the steamer returned to Hampton Roads on the evening of 31 August and began cruising in Chesapeake Bay where she took the schooner Alabama off the mouth of the Potomac River on 14 September. Next ordered back to waters off the outer banks of North Carolina, Albatross, except for periodic runs to Hampton Roads for fuel and provisions and a trip to Baltimore, Maryland, for repairs, operated near Beaufort, North Carolina until April 1862 when she was transferred to the South Atlantic Blockading Squadron.

=== Reassigned to the South Atlantic blockade ===
The highlight of this stint of service off Beaufort was her discovery and destruction of the grounded 800-ton British ship York of Dublin, Ireland, near Bogue Inlet on 16 January 1862. After reporting to Flag Officer Samuel Francis du Pont, the ship spent May and June in Winyah Bay, South Carolina, blockading Georgetown, South Carolina. There, on 20 June, two boats from Albatross captured the steam tug Treaty and schooner Louisa.

=== Reassigned to the West Gulf blockade ===
Early in July 1862, the steamer proceeded to Boston, Massachusetts where she arrived on 10 July for repairs. When ready again for sea, Albatross, commanded by Commander Henry French since 1 August, was reassigned to the West Gulf Blockading Squadron. She stood out to sea on the evening of 7 August and, after reporting to Rear Admiral David Farragut, was stationed off the mouth of the Rio Grande near Brownsville, Texas. There, on 21 September, she captured the schooner Two Sisters of Galveston, Texas, flying the Confederate flag as she was sailing from Sisal, Mexico, toward Galveston with 87 bales of gunny cloth for Southern cotton gins and one case of crinolines, probably intended for a less utilitarian purpose.

=== Outbreak of yellow fever ===
Late in September 1862, yellow fever broke out on Albatross. Upon the recommendation of the ship's surgeon, Commander French sailed to Pensacola, Florida, where she arrived on 4 October. Farragut placed the steamer in quarantine, and she was forbidden to communicate with the rest of the squadron. Nevertheless, the admiral reprimanded French for leaving his station before his ship had been properly relieved and, on 29 October, sent him north in USS Rhode Island with orders to report to Secretary of the Navy Gideon Welles. Lieutenant Commander John E. Hart took command of Albatross.

After the health of her crew had been restored, the steamer began patrolling off the Gulf of Mexico shore in mid-November. From 24 November until 8 December 1862, boat crews from Albatross and from the armed brig USS Bohio made a series of raids against salt works along the Florida coast between St. Andrews Bay and Pensacola, during which they destroyed over 300 salt pans.

=== Mississippi River operations ===
On 11 December 1862, Albatross sailed for the Mississippi River where the tempo of operations to free the river for Union shipping was increasing. On 17 December, she, USS Richmond, USS Cayuga, USS Katahdin, and USS Winona supported the uncontested landing of Major General Nathaniel Prentiss Banks' troops at Baton Rouge, Louisiana. Ever since the previous spring, when his thrusts upriver had been nullified by a lack of ground forces, Farragut had been awaiting army support for clearing the Mississippi. After the surrender of Baton Rouge, he was eager to move on to the next Confederate river stronghold, Port Hudson, Louisiana, but no soldiers were made available for the operation.

Finally, with the approach of the spring, misfortunes to Rear Admiral David Dixon Porter's Mississippi Squadron, which had been attempting to send some of its gunboats past Vicksburg, Mississippi, to patrol the river between that strongly fortified position and Port Hudson, prompted Farragut to brave the guns of Port Hudson without help from Banks. On the evening of 13 March 1863, he moved seven of his warships - four saltwater men-of-war and three gunboats - some 15 miles above Baton Rouge and anchored for the night.

During the next day, he gave careful attention to the readiness of each ship in the force for battle. He had three of the heavy warships lashed to the port and soon-to-be-engaged sides of the smaller gunboats, pairing his flagship, USS Hartford, with Albatross, Richmond with USS Genesee, and USS Monongahela with USS Kineo. USS Mississippi, proceeding alone, brought up the rear. Farragut later explained his selection of Albatross as Hartford's partner:

Albatross being the most vulnerable of the gunboats, and her speed being about equal to that of this ship, was assigned to her. ...

=== Braving the fire of Port Hudson ===
Shortly after 10:00 p.m., the fleet got underway. Moving up the river "in good style," Hartford and Albatross weathered the hail of shot from the batteries. Major General Franklin Gardner, commanding Confederate forces at Port Hudson, noted: "She returned our fire boldly." While the flagship and her consort were passing the lower batteries, the current nearly swung the pair around and grounded them; "but," Farragut reported, "backing the Albatross, and going ahead strong on this ship, we at length headed her up the river." Though able to bring only two guns to bear on the upper batteries, Farragut successfully passed those works.

Following the flagship closely, Richmond took a hit in her steam plant, disabling her. "The turning point (in the river) was gained," Commander James Alden, Jr. reported, "but I soon found, even with the aid of the Genesee, which vessel was lashed alongside, that we could make no headway against the strong current of the river, and suffering much from a galling cross fire of the enemy's batteries, I was compelled though most reluctantly, to turn back, and by the aid of the Genesee soon anchored out of the range of their guns."

Next in line, Monongahela ran hard aground under Port Hudson's lower batteries where she remained for nearly half an hour, taking severe punishment. At least eight shots passed entirely through the ship. The bridge was shot from underneath Captain James P. McKinstry, wounding him and killing three others. With Kineo's aid, Monongahela was refloated; and she attempted to resume her course upriver. "We were nearly by the principal battery," wrote Lieutenant Nathaniel W. Thomas, the executive officer, "when the crank pin of the forward engine was reported heated, and the engine stopped. ..." The ship became unmanageable and drifted downstream, where she anchored out of range of the Confederate guns.

=== USS Mississippi is lost after grounding ===
Meanwhile, on board Mississippi, Captain Melancton Smith saw Richmond coming downstream but, because of the heavy smoke of the battle, was unable to sight Monongahela. Thinking that she had steamed ahead to close the gap caused by Richmond's leaving the formation, he ordered his ship "go ahead fast". In attempting to do so, Mississippi ran aground and, despite every effort, could not be brought off. After being set afire in four places, she was abandoned. At 3:00 a.m., Mississippi was seen in flames floating slowly down river; and, two and one-half hours later, she blew up. Thus ended one of the war's fiercest engagements. Only Hartford and Albatross had succeeded in running the gauntlet.

Commenting on Albatross' role, Farragut stated,

"... although it was not in Lieutenant Commander Hart's power to do much, still he did all that was in his power, and whenever he could bring a gun to bear, ahead or astern, on the port side, it was instantly fired." Albatross' only casualty in the action was Charles Raick, the captain's steward, who according to the ship's deck log, "... was killed while nobly fighting his gun."

But for a Parrott gun which lost a part of its trunnion when struck by a shell, the ship suffered little material damage.

=== Beyond the reach of Port Hudson's guns ===
After reaching comparative safety beyond the range of Port Hudson's guns, the two Union warships operated in the stretch of the Mississippi between that Southern fortress and Vicksburg until both of these Confederate riverbank strongholds had fallen almost four months later. While plying these waters which bristled with hostile batteries, they denied the Southern armies fighting in the East the steady flow of men, food, horses, and miscellaneous supplies which had supported Confederate troops since the onset of the conflict.

In the middle of March, Albatross engaged the Confederate batteries at Grand Gulf, Mississippi, and suffered one man killed and nine wounded. On 4 May 1863, she attacked the Confederate Fort De Russy and engaged two Confederate steamers moored to the earthworks, CSS Grand Duke and Mary T.

=== James Brown awarded the Medal of Honor ===
In the engagement, Grand Duke was set on fire five times and suffered seven wounded, while Albatross was badly shot up and suffered heavy casualties when a 32-pounder ball came through the wheelhouse carrying the wheel away and causing the relieving tackles to be manned by men in plain view of the enemy. Two men from the ship were killed and four wounded. Quartermaster James H. Brown displayed most unusual courage during the action. After the steering wheel and wheel ropes had been shot away, Brown stood on the gun platform of the quarterdeck, exposing himself to close fire from musketry ashore and rendered invaluable assistance by his expert management of the relieving tackles. By doing so, he was instrumental in extricating the vessel from a perilous position and thereby aided in the capture of Fort De Russy's heavy works. Brown later received the Medal of Honor for his valor.

=== Death of Lt. Commander Hart ===
In June 1863, while Albatross was stationed above Port Hudson, her captain, John E. Hart, contracted yellow fever. A few days later he became delusional, and on 11 June 1863, he committed suicide in his cabin with his own revolver. He was officially listed as "killed in battle". His officers were unable to send his body home to Schenectady for burial, and knowing he would wish a Masonic burial, Executive Officer Theodore B. Du Bois went ashore under a flag of truce to ask if there were any Masons in the area who would conduct a funeral. They were put in contact with Confederate Army Captain William Walter Leake, a company commander with the 1st Louisiana Cavalry, who was home on furlough. Leake was Senior Warden of Feliciana Lodge No. 31 in the nearby town of St. Francisville, Louisiana, and he made arrangements for Hart to be buried at Grace Episcopal Church there. A truce was arranged so that the Union officers could bring his body ashore, attend the funeral, and return to their ship to resume their blockade. A joint party of Union and Confederate officers, all Masons, participated in the funeral on 12 June 1863; Leake himself conducted the Masonic service. The event is now commemorated in St. Francisville every June as "The Day the War Stopped". Du Bois, with the rank of Acting Volunteer Lieutenant Commander, took over command of Albatross for the duration of the war.

=== Repair and quarantine ===
Following the surrender of Port Hudson on 9 July, Albatross dropped down river and briefly operated on patrol out of New Orleans before beginning a repair period which lasted until mid-September when the ship joined the blockading forces off Mobile Bay. A month later, yellow fever was again raging and compelled the ship to be placed in quarantine at Pensacola.

=== Returned to the Gulf blockade ===
When again ready for duty, Albatross served as a dispatch vessel, then returned to blockade duty off Mobile, Alabama. Late in the year, she resumed cruising in the Gulf of Mexico. On 9 January 1864, the ship shelled a large steamer lying under the guns of Fort Morgan, Alabama, at the entrance to Mobile Bay. Thereafter, other than periods of repairs, she alternated blockade duty with dispatch service until 21 May 1864 when she was ordered north for major repairs at the Portsmouth Navy Yard where she was decommissioned on 6 June.

Recommissioned on the day after Christmas 1864, the steamer was ordered back to the West Gulf Blockading Squadron. However, while sailing south, she encountered "... a fierce storm some 100 miles south of Cape Cod and was severely damaged, losing her smokestack and her top foremast. Her boats were also badly battered." Proceeding "with the aid of sails and what small amount of steam we could make without a pipe," the ship managed to reach the Delaware River breakwater and entered the Philadelphia Navy Yard for repairs. When once more seaworthy, she headed for the gulf and was stationed at Mobile where she served through the end of the war.

== Post-war sale and subsequent maritime career ==
Following the collapse of the Confederacy, Albatross sailed to the Boston Navy Yard where she was decommissioned on 11 August 1865. She was sold at public auction there on 8 September 1865 to C. P. Stickney. Redocumented on 23 September 1865, the ship operated in merchant service until her engines were removed in 1888, and she was dropped from shipping registers.

== See also ==
- Confederate States Navy
