= Gravina (clipper) =

Clipper (ship)

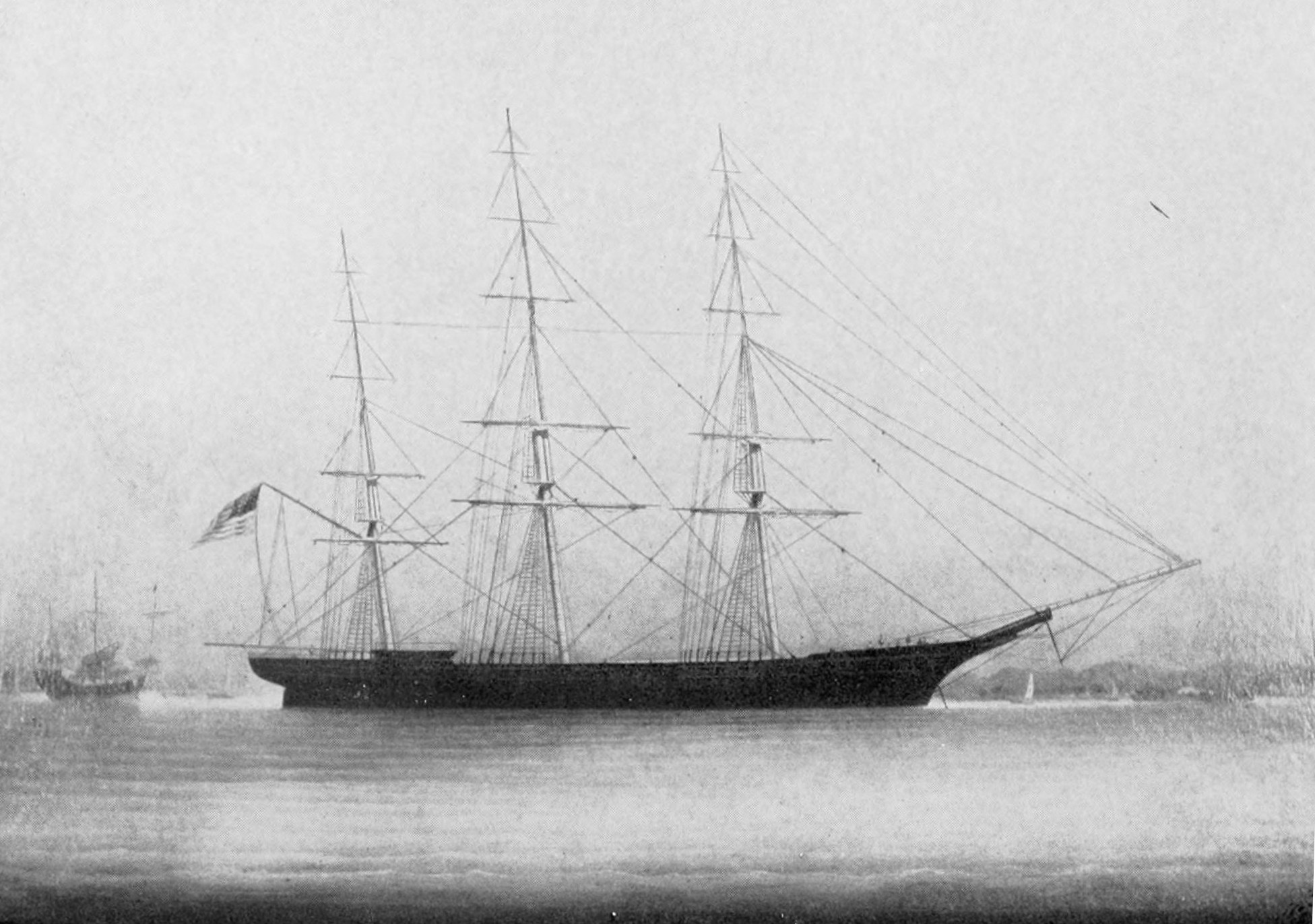
- Gravina

History
- Name: Gravina
- Namesake: Federico Carlos Gravina y Nápoli
- Owner: Loring Brothers
- Builder: Isaac C. Smith & Son (Hoboken, NJ)
- Launched: 8 October 1853
- Maiden voyage: 14 November 1853
- Home port: Málaga, Spain
- Fate: Unknown; last reported sighting 1866

General characteristics
- Type: Clipper ship
- Tonnage: 818 register
- Length: 165 ft (50 m); 150 ft (46 m) keel; 180 ft (55 m) overall
- Beam: 32 ft (9.8 m)
- Draft: 17 ft (5.2 m) ?
- Depth of hold: 18 ft (5.5 m)
- Decks: 1 "& Beams"
- Armament: 2 deck guns

Gravina was an 818-register ton clipper ship built in Hoboken, New Jersey, in 1853. A rare example of a clipper built in the United States for foreign owners, Gravina was originally homeported in Spain, though commanded by an American.

Gravina spent the early part of her career in China service, making at least two trips to Shanghai. She later roamed far and wide, making voyages to South America, Pacific destinations and Australia. Sold at Valparaíso, Chile, in 1860, the ship disappeared from the documentary record after 1866.

== Construction and design ==
Gravina, a wooden-hulled clipper ship, was built in Hoboken, New Jersey, in 1853 by Isaac C. Smith & Son. She was launched at 12:30 pm on 8 October. Unusually for an American-built clipper, Gravina was built for foreign owners, the Loring Brothers of Málaga, Spain. The brothers, George, Edward and Joseph, were the sons of American expatriate George Loring, who "went to Málaga as a young man and married there a very beautiful Spanish girl of sixteen years of age." Gravina was named after Spanish Admiral Federico Carlos Gravina y Nápoli, commander of the reserve fleet under the French at the Battle of Trafalgar.

Gravina was built of oak, with copper and iron fastenings. She had a length of 165 feet (50 m), keel length of 150 feet (46 m), beam of 32 feet (9.8 m), draft of 17 feet (5.2 m) and hold depth of 18 feet (5.5 m). Her registered tonnage was 818. She was fitted with a half poop deck, and in addition to her cargo capacity, had a cabin for the accommodation of passengers. For defense, she was armed with a pair of cannon.

Gravina was built by the Loring Brothers with Captain Caleb Sprague, a native of Hingham, Massachusetts, in mind as her master. Sprague would skipper the vessel until about 1860. His son, F. W. Sprague, was familiar with Gravina as a boy and described her in his memoirs as "a beautiful ship".

== Service history ==
Gravina departed New York on her maiden voyage on 14 November 1853, bound for Shanghai, China, (Note: This voyage was apparently made via Boston as Captain Sprague's son F. W Sprague, then a boy, relates in his memoir how he watched the burning of the clipper ship Great Republic at Boston on 26 December 1853 from Gravina's deck. Knoblock, citing Sprague, erroneously writes that Gravina was also damaged in the fire and "subsequently cut down in size by one deck"—uncorroborated claims evidently based on a misreading of the source, which refers to the damage and rebuilding not of Gravina but of Great Republic. Gravina is known to have completed her journey to China without mishap.) arriving 14 April 1854 at Wusong, 14 miles (23 km) below Shanghai, the latter being at the time in the hands of Chinese rebels. Travelling with Gravina on this trip was a seven-person Episcopal missionary group including Bishop W. J. Boone, his family and associates. A member of this group later described their 150-day voyage on Gravina as "unfortunate in the matter of head winds and calms" but otherwise "pleasant and safe", while Boone himself complimented Captain Sprague on his "most kind and obliging" manner.

After taking on a cargo of tea, Gravina became stranded in the Min River, Fujian, in late June 1854, but was hauled off with minimal damage and continued on to Deal, England, where she arrived 23 October. Proceeding on to London, Gravina's agents were advertising a voyage of the vessel to Shanghai from early December but in the event, she remained in port for another two months and did not sail until 2 February 1855, arriving at Shanghai mid-June. On one of her trips to China, Gravina was attacked by Chinese pirates in junks, who were driven off by the clipper's two deck guns.

From Shanghai, Gravina went to Manila, the Philippines; Batavia, the Dutch East Indies; and Amsterdam, the Netherlands, where she arrived in March 1856. While at Batavia, Captain Sprague's wife, who had joined her husband on the ship in New York the previous year, fell ill, and died after returning home to the United States.

Gravina's later record of voyages is incomplete. She is known to have made at least one voyage from Málaga, Spain, to South America. In mid-1859, she was back in Pacific service, making a voyage from Manila to Singapore.

In 1860, Captain Sprague sold Gravina in Valparaíso, Chile, to parties in that city. In 1865, she was in Sydney, Australia, under the command of Captain John Laffrentz, preparing for a voyage to "Valparaíso direct". Her last reported sighting was in Valparaíso in 1866.
