= USS Western World =

Gunboat of the United States Navy

History

United States
- Launched: 1856
- Acquired: 21 September 1861
- Commissioned: 3 January 1862
- Decommissioned: 26 May 1865
- Fate: Sold, 24 June 1865

General characteristics
- Displacement: 441 tons
- Length: 178 ft (54 m)
- Beam: 34 ft 3 in (10.44 m)
- Draft: 6 ft (1.8 m) (est.)
- Propulsion: steam engine; screw-propelled
- Speed: 7 knots (13 km/h; 8.1 mph)
- Armament: one 30-pounder Parrott rifle; two 32-pounder Parrott rifles

USS Western World was a ship acquired by the Union Navy during the American Civil War. She was used by the Navy to patrol navigable waterways of the Confederacy to prevent the South from trading with other countries.

== Service history ==
Western World—a screw steamer built in 1856 at Brooklyn, New York—was purchased by the Navy on 21 September 1861 at New York City from S. Schuyler; and commissioned on 3 January 1862 at the New York Navy Yard, Acting Master Samuel B. Gregory in command. On 2 January 1862, Western World was ordered to Port Royal, South Carolina, to join the South Atlantic Blockading Squadron. On the 26th, she participated in a major reconnaissance sweep of the Savannah River, Georgia, and its tributaries. The force included the gunboats Ottawa and Seneca; armed Steamers Isaac Smith, Potomska, and Ellen; and transports Cosmopolitan, Delaware, and Boston carrying over 2,400 troops under the command of Brigadier General H. G. Wright. The Union flotilla repulsed an attack by five Confederate vessels on 28 January and the next day completed invaluable survey work. On 14 February 1862, Western World and E. B. Hale drove off four Confederate vessels which attempted to break the Union blockade of the Mud and Wright's Rivers, tributaries of the Savannah River. This restricted Confederate activity upon the Savannah River and protected the newly installed Federal battery at Venus Point. After remaining off the Savannah through May, Western World returned to Port Royal on 2 June.

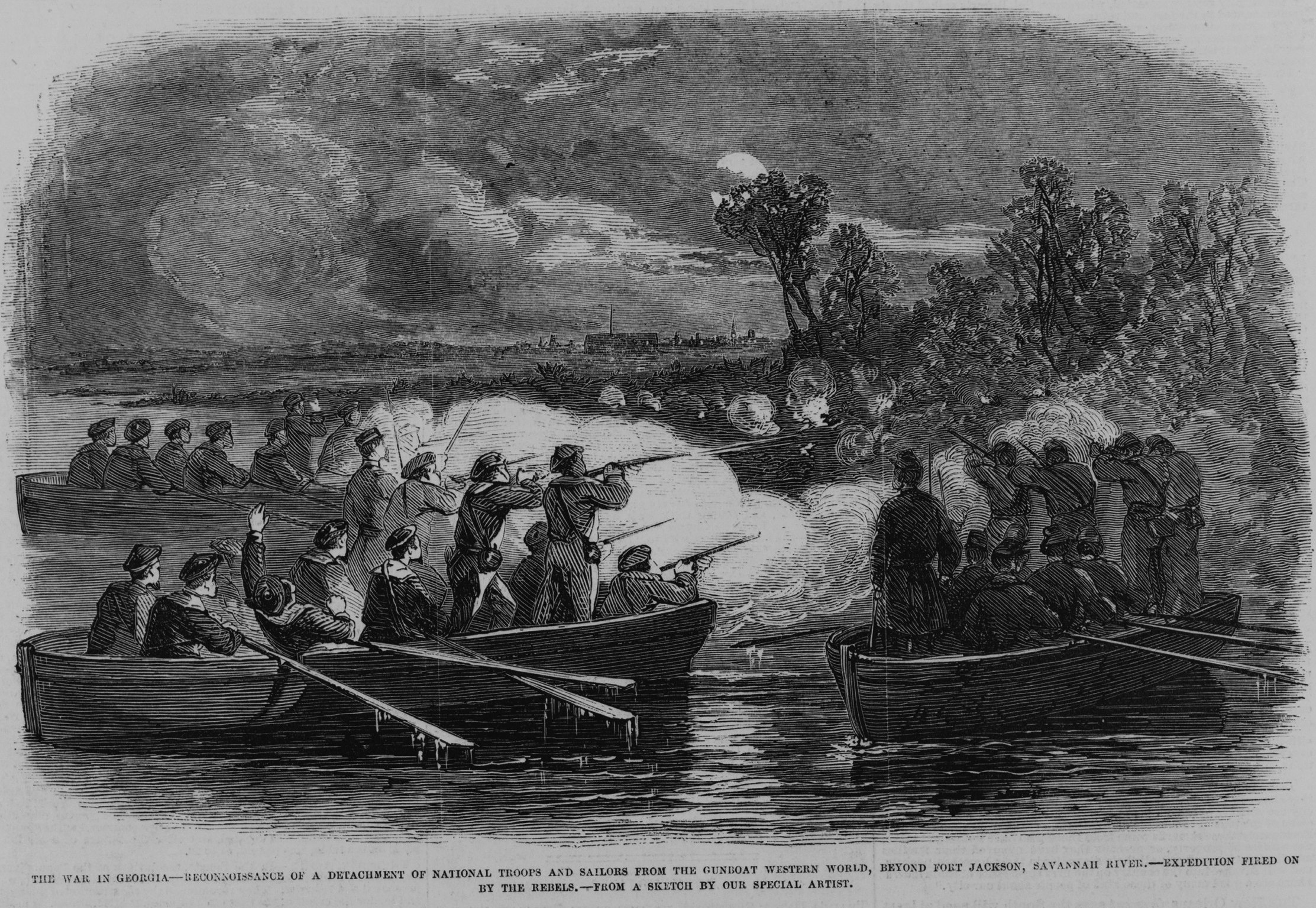
The war in Georgia, reconnaissance of a detachment of national troops and sailors from the gunboat Western World, beyond Fort Jackson, Savannah River. Expedition fired on by the Rebels

On the 6th, Western World called briefly at St. Johns River, Florida, to reprovision Union ships on blockade duty there. She immediately returned to Port Royal and was dispatched on the 10th to the blockade off Georgetown, South Carolina, commanded by Comdr. G. A. Prentiss on board Albatross. On 25 June 1862, Western World, Andrew, and E. B. Hale entered the North Santee River, South Carolina, intending to destroy an important railroad bridge inland. En route, parties from the warships set fire to several plantations and took over 400 slaves on board the steamers. During an expedition in Winyah Bay, South Carolina, Western World captured the British schooner Volante on 2 July. However, intense shore fire and the sharp, unnavigable bends of the river prompted Comdr. Prentiss to abandon the expedition the following day. On the 25th, Western World sailed for Port Royal carrying contraband. However, she soon left the squadron base for blockade duty off Doboy Sound, Georgia, which occupied the ship until the end of October when she sailed north to the New York Navy Yard for extensive overhaul.

Western World departed New York on 16 February 1863 and arrived at Newport News, Virginia, on 11 March for duty with the North Atlantic Blockading Squadron. A week later, she towed General Putnam to Baltimore, Maryland, for repairs. Structural problems forced Western World, herself, to the Philadelphia Navy Yard late in the month; but she departed Philadelphia, Pennsylvania, on 1 April for Yorktown, Virginia, and blockade duty between the Piankatank River and Fort Monroe, Virginia. Through the spring and summer, Western World participated actively in operations along the Virginia coast and in the Chesapeake Bay. On 19 April, she and USS Commodore Morris escorted transport units of the Army of the Potomac up the York as far as the Pamunkey River. Together with Samuel Rotan, she captured schooners Martha Ann and A. Carson off Horn Harbor, Virginia, on the 24th. With Crusader, she destroyed two abandoned schooners in Milford Haven, Virginia, on 1 May 1863. On the 27th, she captured two large sailboats, took two prisoners, and confiscated Confederate coin and currency in Stokes Creek, Virginia. On 13 June 1863, Western World proceeded north to search for Confederate commerce raider Tacony. However, she lost her rudderhead during a storm and returned to the Norfolk Navy Yard for repairs on 17 June 1863.

Western World was back in action within a week. Beginning on 23 June 1863, with gunboats Commodore Barney, Commodore Morris, Morse, Smith Briggs, and Jesup, she escorted and covered a troop landing at White House, Virginia. During the week-long operation, Western World brought up and landed nearly 300 cavalry. On 1 July 1863, she was deployed in the Pamunkey River, Virginia. Late in the month, Western World returned to Hampton Roads where she picked up mail for delivery to blockade ships off Wilmington, North Carolina. On the voyage to North Carolina waters, she also carried 150 seamen to Beaufort, North Carolina, for blockade duty in the sounds. On 10 September 1863, the worn-out vessel proceeded to the Washington Navy Yard for repairs. Repairs completed, Western World was assigned on 2 February 1864 to the Second Division of the Potomac Flotilla but, a week later, was transferred to the First Division and assigned to patrol duty from Piankatank River to Blakistone Island. However, the ship returned to the Washington Navy Yard on 1 April for more repairs and remained there until early November.

Western World was assigned to the North Atlantic Blockading Squadron on 10 November 1864. She patrolled the Virginia coast between the Nansemond River and Lawn's Creek and, on 15 December 1864, helped to refloat the grounded monitor Saugus. On 5 March 1865, she arrived in the Rappahannock River to support the Army of the Potomac in operations against Fredericksburg, Virginia. Later transferred to White House, Virginia, she sailed on 21 March for St. Inigoes, Maryland, and duty in the Potomac Flotilla. Western World was deployed in Virginia's Mobjack Bay on 6 April and, on 5 May, proceeded to the Washington Navy Yard. She was decommissioned there on 26 May 1865 and was sold at public auction on 24 June 1865 to H. R. Hazelhurst.
