= CSS Grand Duke =

Steamboat

History

Confederate States
- Name: Grand Duke
- Launched: 1859
- Commissioned: February 1863
- Decommissioned: 1863
- Fate: Burned

General characteristics
- Displacement: 508 tons
- Length: 205 ft (62 m)
- Beam: 35 ft (11 m)
- Draft: 7 ft 6 in (2.29 m)
- Propulsion: steam engine

CSS Grand Duke, a steamer built at Jeffersonville, Indiana in 1859, was outfitted as a cotton-clad gunboat for service with the Confederate States Army in February 1863.

Grand Duke transported troops to Fort Taylor, Louisiana late in February 1863. On April 14, 1863, she was in company with the steamer Mary T. and ram CSS Queen of the West when they were taken under attack on the Atchafalaya River by Union vessels USS Estrella, USS Calhoun, and USS Arizona. Her speed, turning power, and superior piloting allowed Grand Duke to escape up river.

On May 4, 1863 Grand Duke and Mary T. were taking on guns, ordnance stores, and other public property prior to the evacuation of Fort DeRussy when a Union reconnaissance force that included USS Albatross, Estrella, and Arizona hove into view. In the ensuing hour-long engagement, each of the principal contestants sustained damage, but the Union ships withdrew, allowing the Confederates to remove their materiel further up the Red River and to delay the Federal advance by obstructing the river. Grand Duke was ordered to Shreveport, Louisiana where she burned late in 1863.
