= Whipstaff =

Sailing ship steering device

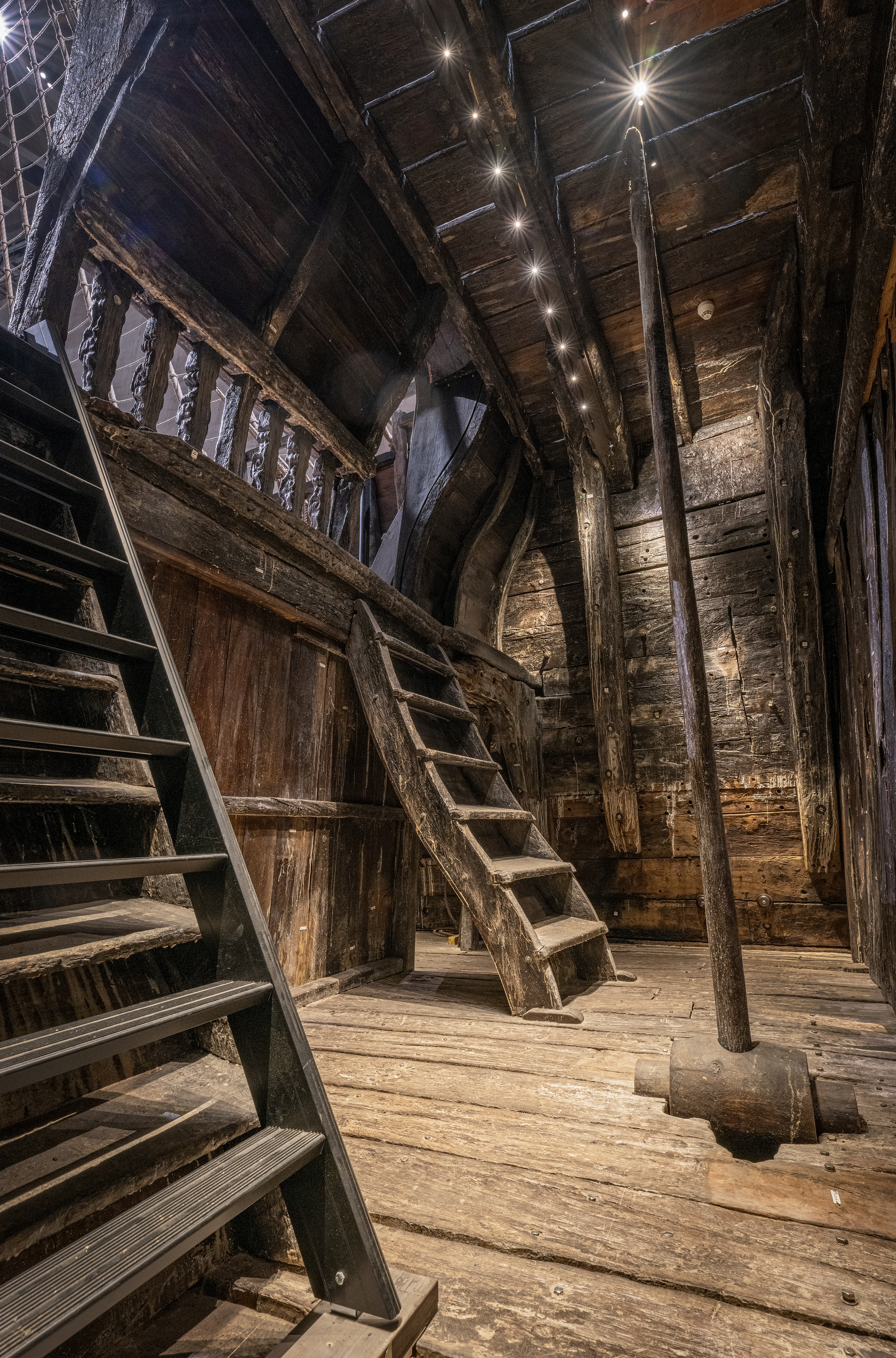
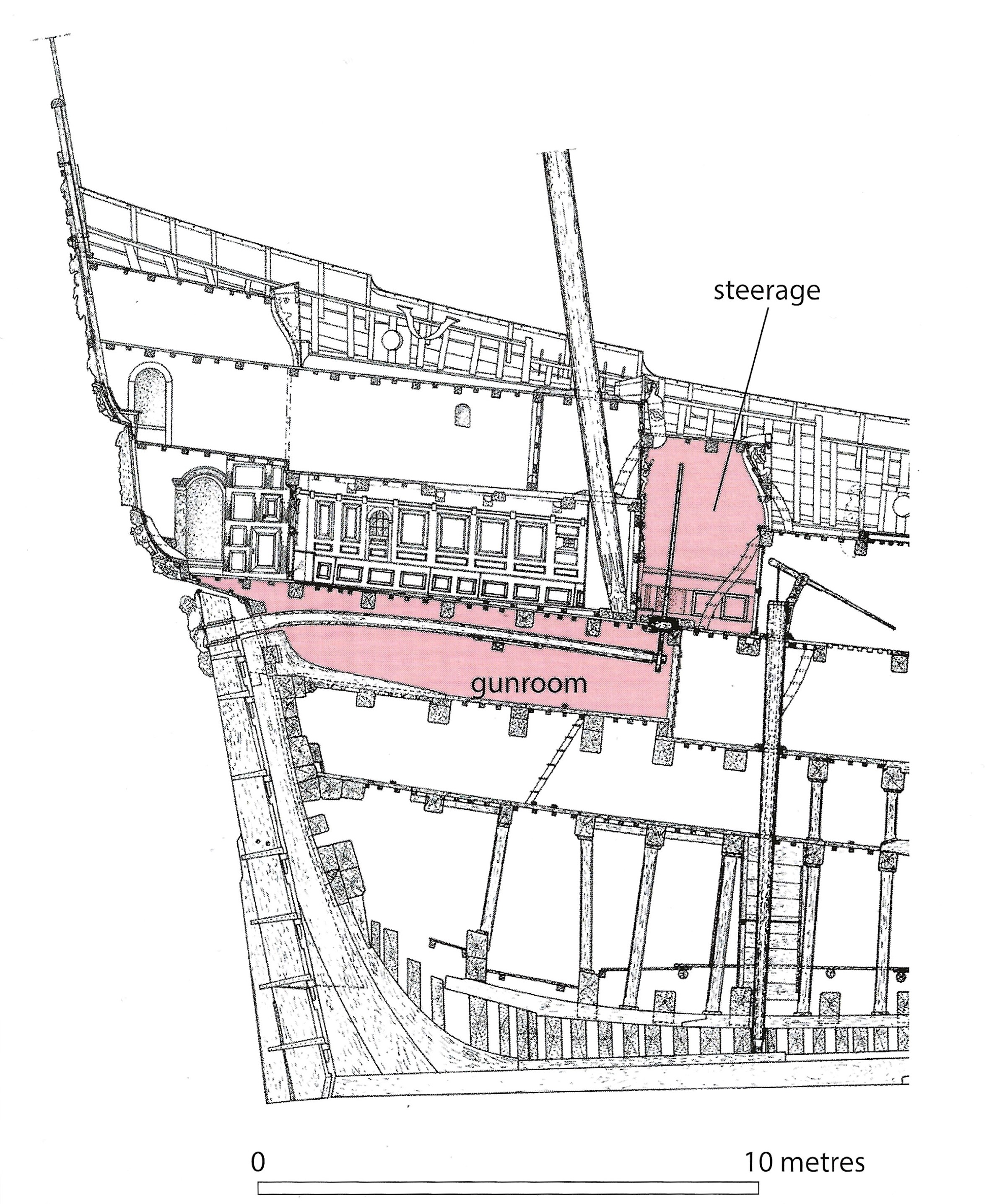
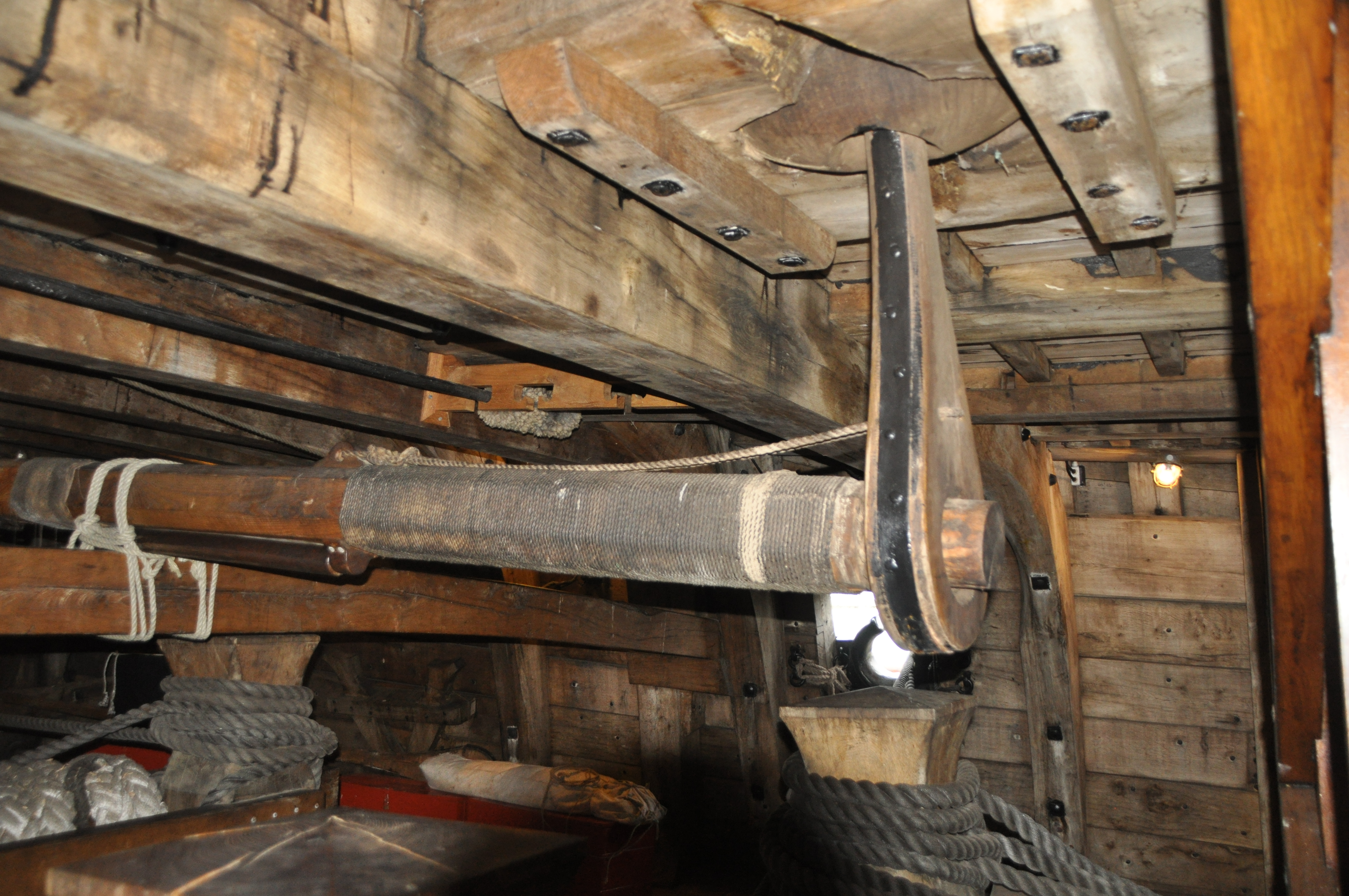
- Upper left: The whipstaff in the steerage compartment of Vasa. The photograph is taken from the port side. The opening which provided some view of the sails is in the upper left of the picture.
- Upper right: The location of the whipstaff and tiller within the after part of the hull of Vasa. The view is from the starboard side.
- Bottom: The connection between whipstaff and tiller on the Batavia replica. The whipstaff (on right) descends through the rowle from the deck above and fits over the end of the tiller, which goes to the rudder head (out of picture to the left)

A whipstaff is a steering device that was used on European sailing ships from the 14th to the 18th century. Its development preceded the invention of the more complex ship's wheel and followed the simple use of a tiller to control the steering of a ship underway.

In a typical arrangement, an iron gooseneck was fitted at the fore end of the tiller. Then, a metal ring was fitted over this and secured with a pin. The ring was attached to a long, thin pole (the whipstaff proper) and this pole connected the tiller to the helmsman one or more decks above it through a pivot point, roll, or rowle, described as "that round piece of wood or iron wherein the whip doth go and is made turn about that it may carry over the whip from side to side with more ease." The helmsman himself still usually did not stand on the topmost deck, but rather viewed what lay ahead of the ship through a small port or hatchway in the deck above him called a companion. To move the ship to port, the forward-facing helmsman pulled the top of the staff to his left and pushed the pole down and to the right; to move it to starboard, he pulled the top to his right and pushed the pole down and to the left. In this fashion, the tiller might get as much as 20° of turn. The tiller rested on a very strong horizontal wooden bar called the tiller sweep, which was sheathed in metal and coated with soap and grease to minimise the drag of the tiller as it rode across it.
