= USS Kennison =

Wickes-class destroyer

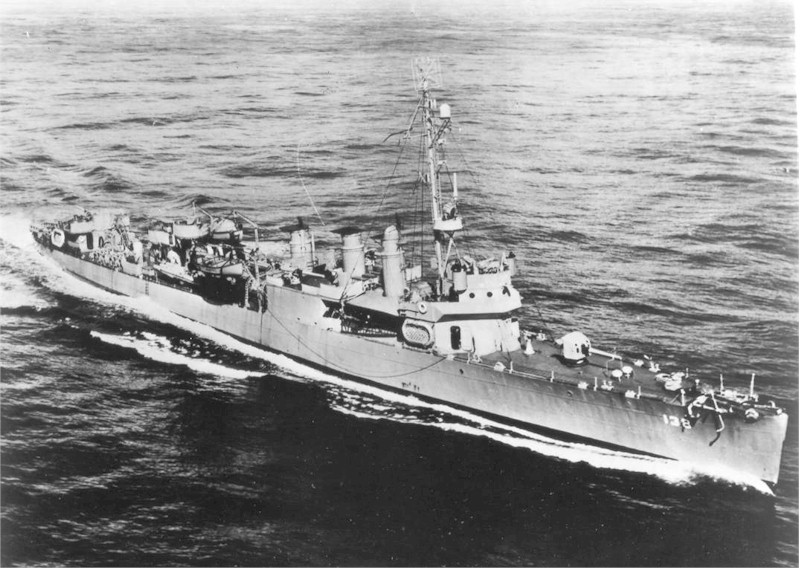
- Kennison underway

History

United States
- Name: Kennison
- Namesake: William Kennison
- Builder: Mare Island Navy Yard
- Laid down: 14 February 1918
- Launched: 8 June 1918
- Commissioned: 2 April 1919
- Decommissioned: 22 June 1922
- Identification: DD-138
- Recommissioned: 18 December 1939
- Decommissioned: 21 November 1945
- Reclassified: AG-83, 1944
- Stricken: 5 December 1945
- Fate: Sold for scrapping, 18 November 1946

General characteristics
- Class & type: Wickes-class destroyer
- Displacement: 1,154 long tons (1,173 t)
- Length: 314 ft 5 in (95.8 m)
- Beam: 31 ft 9 in (9.7 m)
- Draft: 9 ft 0 in (2.7 m)
- Speed: 35 knots (65 km/h; 40 mph)
- Complement: 113 officers and enlisted
- Armament: 4 × 4 in (102 mm)/50 guns; 2 × 3 in (76 mm)/23 guns; 1 × 1-pounder gun; 12 × 21 in (533 mm) torpedo tubes

USS Kennison (DD–138) was a Wickes-class destroyer in the United States Navy during World War II, later redesignated AG-83. She was the first ship named for William Kennison.

Kennison was launched on 8 June 1918 by the Mare Island Navy Yard, Vallejo, California; sponsored by Miss Elizabeth Riner; and commissioned on 2 April 1919.

== Service history ==
Following completion, shakedown, and acceptance trials, Kennison arrived in San Diego, her home port, 25 March 1920. During the summer she engaged in experimental torpedo and antiaircraft exercises. The destroyer continued coastal operations and tactical exercises until 12 August 1921 when she put into San Diego with 50 percent complement. She decommissioned at San Diego on 22 June 1922.

Recommissioned 18 December 1939, Kennison joined the Neutrality Patrol out of San Diego on 6 May 1940. From June to September she engaged in reserve training cruises before rejoining the Neutrality Patrol on 14 October. The destroyer continued patrol operations along the West Coast until the United States entered World War II. As the war effort increased in early 1942, Kennison intensified her anti-submarine warfare (ASW) operations including escort of convoys and submarines to various California ports until 22 September 1944 when she sailed for Bremerton, Washington to undergo conversion.

Redesignated AG-83, Kennison returned to San Diego on 9 November 1944 to resume service. For the rest of the war she operated out of San Diego as a target ship for plane exercises with aerial torpedoes. These exercises provided training to Navy pilots preparing for combat. Following the war Kennison sailed for the East Coast, arriving at Norfolk, Virginia in late October. She decommissioned on 21 November 1945 at Portsmouth, Virginia. She was sold 18 November 1946 to Luria Brothers & Company, Inc., Philadelphia, Pennsylvania, and scrapped.
