= USS Bohio =

Brig of the United States Navy

History

United States
- Name: USS Bohio
- Namesake: Bohio, a type of thatched hut found in the West Indies (previous name retained)
- Laid down: 1856
- Launched: 1856
- Completed: 1856
- Acquired: 9 September 1861
- Commissioned: 30 December 1861
- Decommissioned: 25 July 1865
- Fate: Sold 27 September 1865

General characteristics
- Type: Brig
- Tonnage: 197 tons
- Length: 100 ft (30 m)
- Beam: 24 ft 9 in (7.54 m)
- Depth: 9 ft 4 in (2.84 m)
- Armament: two 32-pounder smoothbore cannon

USS Bohio was an armed brig in commission in the United States Navy from 1861 to 1865. As part of the Union Navy, she saw service during the American Civil War.

== Construction, acquisition, and commissioning ==
Bohio was constructed as a civilian brig at Williamsburg in Brooklyn, New York, in 1856. The U.S. Navy purchased her on 9 September 1861 for service in the American Civil War and commissioned her on 30 December 1861 with Acting Master William D. Gregory in command.

== Service history ==
Bohio joined the Union Navy′s West Gulf Blockading Squadron in the Gulf of Mexico in January 1862 to take part in the Union blockade of Confederate ports and cruised along the coasts of Alabama and Louisiana. During 1862 she took four prizes and forced the scuttling of a fifth vessel. She joined the U.S. Navy screw steamer USS Albatross in destroying the salt works along St. Andrew Bay in Florida between 24 November and 8 December 1862.

Bohio continued on blockade duty in the Gulf of Mexico, operating in Pensacola Bay off Florida and off the coast of Texas coast until March 1864, when she was converted into a coal vessel.

== Final disposition ==
Bohio was decommissioned at the New York Navy Yard in Brooklyn, New York, on 25 July 1865. She was sold there on 27 September 1865.
