= Isaac C. Smith =

New York and New Jersey shipbuilder (1797–1877)

- Born: 1797; Ossining, New York
- Died: March 15, 1877 (aged 79); White Plains, New York
- Occupations: Sail and steamboat captain; Shipbuilder; Sparmaker; Entrepreneur
- Years active: ca. 1810 to ca. 1860

Isaac C. Smith (1797 – March 15, 1877) was an American sail and steamboat captain, shipbuilder, sparmaker and entrepreneur.

A longterm resident of Ossining, New York (then known as Sing Sing), Smith began his career working aboard Hudson River sloops, eventually rising to the rank of captain. He also built watercraft and worked as a sparmaker. In the mid-1830s, Smith was the initiator of a steamboat line from Ossining to New York City, supervising the construction of two steamboats for the line and taking command of the first.

In 1849, Smith opened a shipyard in Hoboken, New Jersey, where he built a wide variety of vessels, from small sloops to steamboats to large, full-rigged ships. In 1853 he was joined in this venture by his son J. Malcolm Smith, the firm then being renamed Isaac C. Smith & Son. About 30 ships were built at this yard before it closed in 1855 due to a nationwide shipbuilding slump. In all, Smith is said to have built about 100 ships through the course of his career, the best known of which was the 1600-ton Hurricane, reputedly the most extreme clipper ever built.

Smith was also a devout Methodist and contributed to the construction of five churches of that denomination in his native town, for which he was known as "the father of Sing Sing Methodism".

== Life and career ==
Isaac C. Smith was born in 1797 in Sing Sing, New York, (modern day Ossining), one of a large number of children of Caleb Smith and his wife Elizabeth (née Sherwood). Smith's paternal grandfather, John Smith, was one of the earliest settlers of the region that would later become Sing Sing, and worked as a tenant and later owned a farm on the Manor of Phillipsburg.

Smith began his career at an early age, working aboard market sloops on the Hudson River. He sailed the sloop Volunteer for some 23 years, and later became captain of the sloop General Ward. He also "carried on the ship and spar building business."

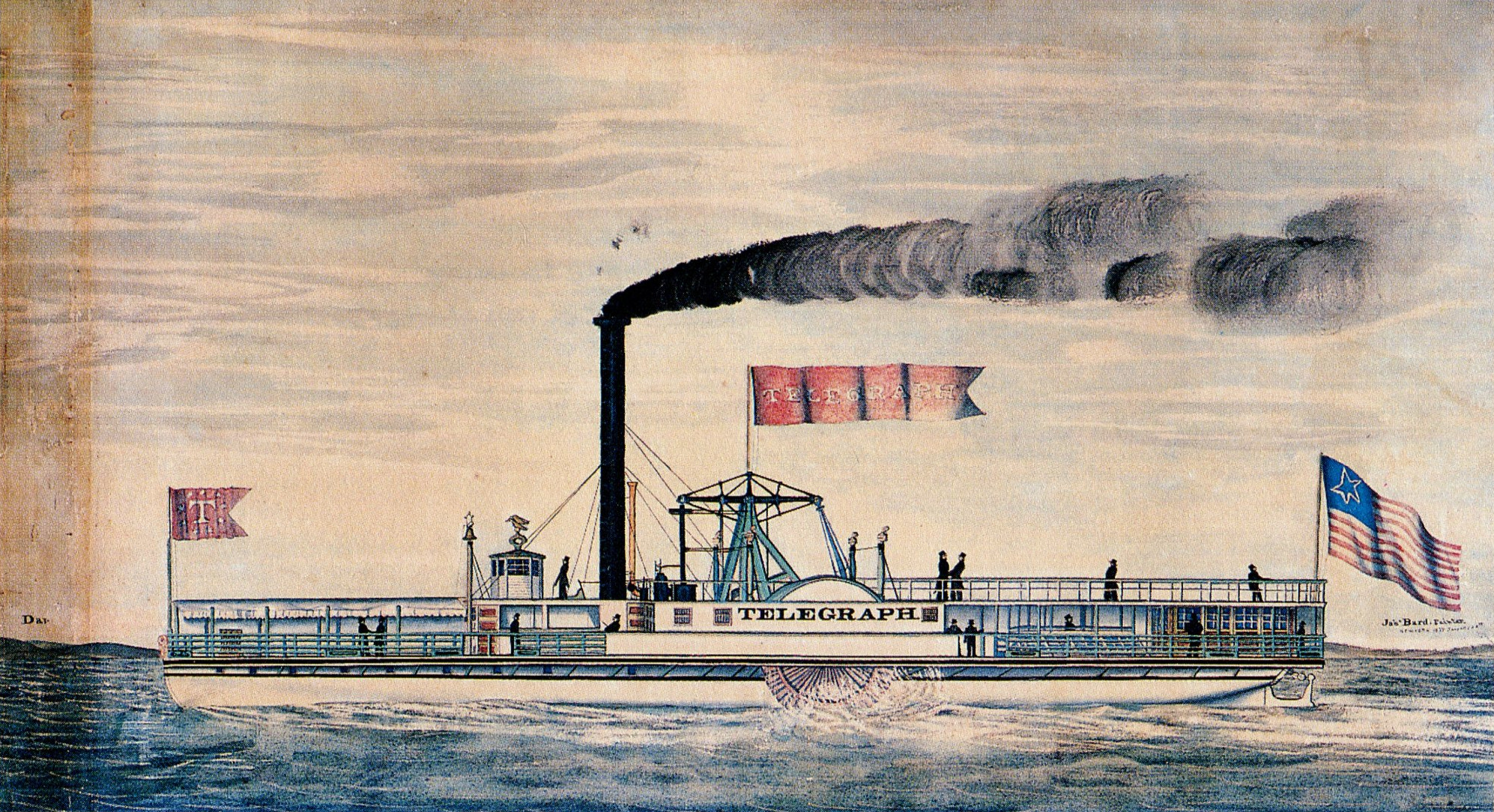
Telegraph, built for Smith's steamboat line in 1836.

In the mid-1830s, Smith proposed the establishment of a steamboat line to run from Sing Sing to New York City. Funds were raised from a number of interested parties including local farmers, and in 1835, the passenger-and-freight steamboat Mount Pleasant was built for the purpose at Sing Sing under Smith's supervision. After completion of the vessel, Smith was appointed her captain. Shortly after, Smith and two partners, Thomas Hulse and Jonathan Odell, organized the construction of a second steamboat, Telegraph, built in New York in 1836 by Lawrence & Sneden, with Smith again supervising construction. These two steamboats reportedly represented the first morning steamboat line established between Sing Sing and the city.

In 1849, Smith opened a shipyard in Hoboken, New Jersey under his own name. Over the next six years, Smith would build a wide variety of vessels at this yard, from sloops to steamboats to large, full-rigged ships. (Note: Also, see shipbuilding table.) In 1853, Smith's son, J. Malcolm Smith, who had been advised for his health to pursue an open-air profession, joined his father in partnership, the firm then being named Isaac C. Smith & Son. (Note: The yard was still being referred to as Isaac C. Smith's in early 1853 and was referred to as "Isaac C. Smith & Son" for the first time in August of that year.) Smith's Hoboken shipyard produced about thirty ships in its relatively brief existence, (Note: See shipbuilding table.) and for the year 1853 was the fourth most prolific New York shipyard by number of vessels built. In 1854–55 however, a deepening nationwide shipbuilding slump persuaded the Smiths to leave the business, the yard's last known ship, "a beautiful clipper schooner" named Colonel John McRae being launched in March 1855. In the entire course of his career, including his output at both Hoboken and Sing Sing, Smith is said to have built a total of more than 100 vessels.

=== Personal details ===
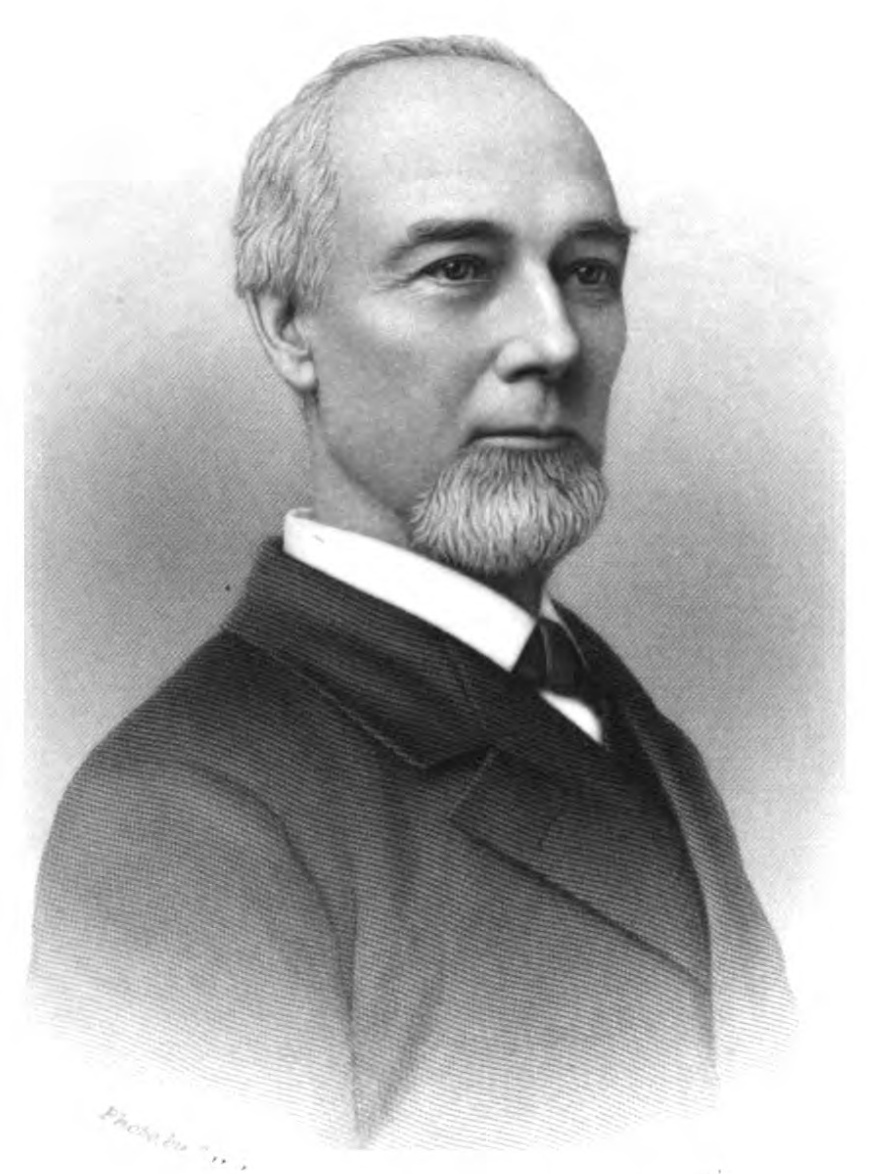
Smith's son and shipbuilding partner, J. Malcolm Smith

Isaac C. Smith's first marriage was to Maria Titlar, daughter of George, an Irish-born American who fought in the American Revolutionary War and "was one of the company who laid the great chain across the Hudson River at West Point". The marriage produced three children, J. Malcolm, Cornelia A. and George T. Smith. J. Malcolm Smith, Isaac's eldest son, was briefly a partner in his father's Hoboken shipyard before becoming a distinguished lawyer and county clerk in White Plains and Sing Sing. Isaac's daughter Cornelia married James T. Stratton, who later became United States Surveyor-General for the state of California. Isaac's second marriage, which took place on 15 March 1854, was to Catharine McCord, widow of James McCord; daughter of James Trowbridge, a captain in the Revolutionary War; and mother of Smith's daughter-in-law Hannah, the wife of J. Malcolm Smith.

Smith was a Methodist, and was an incorporator of and largest contributor to the construction of the first Methodist Church in Sing Sing, after which he participated in the construction of four more Sing Sing churches of the same denomination, for which he became known as the "father of Sing Sing Methodism". In his retirement, he became an enthusiastic yachtsman, taking excursions of up to a week in length with his friends aboard his small ten-ton yacht Cornelia to destinations in and around New York Harbor, New Jersey and Long Island Sound. (Note: A more precise date for the edition could not be established, although it appears to have been published on or after the 23d.) A few months after the death of his second wife in 1874, Smith and his son J. Malcolm took an extended trip by ship and train via the Panama route to California, returning three months later.

Isaac C. Smith was "greatly respected as an honorable citizen" in his native Sing Sing. In the last year of his life, he began to have attacks of paralysis, until eventually, "convinced the end was approaching", he joined the household of his son J. Malcolm in White Plains, where he died two months later on March 15, 1877, at the age of 79. His remains were interred in Dale Cemetery, Ossining.

== Ships of note ==
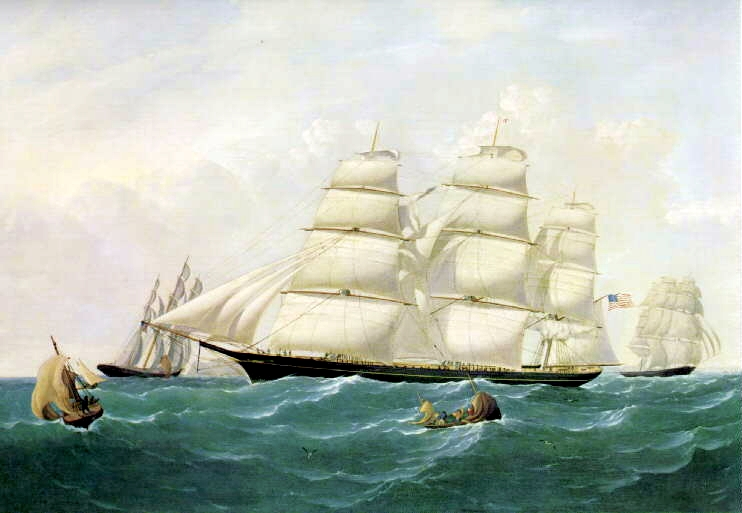
Smith's best-known ship, the extreme clipper Hurricane

The largest and best-known ship built by Isaac C. Smith was the 1600-ton extreme clipper Hurricane, said by some authorities to have been "the sharpest sailing ship ever constructed by any builder". Hurricane proved a very fast vessel, capable in ideal conditions of speeds of up to 18 knots (21 mph; 33 km/h). On an 1854 voyage from New York to San Francisco, Hurricane was on track to challenge Flying Cloud's all-time record passage of 89 days, until adverse conditions over the last 1000 miles lengthened her passage to a still outstanding 100 days. (Note: Fairburn notes that on the 85th day of her voyage, Hurricane was 1,040 miles from San Francisco, as compared to Flying Cloud's 887 miles after the same number of days on her record passage.) On another voyage, from Portsmouth, England to Calcutta, India, in 1855, Hurricane set a record of 82 1/4 days from The Needles to the mouth of the Hooghly River that remained unbeaten for many years.

Smith built two other clippers, the 820-ton Gravina, built in 1853, and the small 470-ton Tejuca, completed in 1854. On an 1855 voyage, Tejuca made "one of the quickest passages on record" from Rio de Janeiro, Brazil, to New Orleans. Less than a year later however, she foundered in a hurricane, the majority of her crew being rescued by a daring maneouvre of the ship Excelsior, for which Excelsior's captain later received an award for heroism.

Smith also built a substantial number of steam vessels, including steamboats, towboats and tugs. The largest of these was the 800-ton freight steamboat Atlas, built in 1852, which had the unusual design feature of external iron strapping for strengthening of her exceptionally broad-beamed hull. Another of Smith's steamboats, Ocean Wave, became notorious for the manner of her demise. After 17 years of service, Ocean Wave was found to be in too poor a condition for passenger service and was restricted by the authorities to freight-only service, but her owners ignored the restriction and continued to use the vessel for weekend passenger excursions. On one such excursion in August 1871, Ocean Wave's defective boiler exploded, sinking the steamer and killing over 70 passengers and crew.

== Shipbuilding record ==
Isaac C. Smith, both alone and in partnership with his son J. Malcolm Smith, is known to have built about thirty ships at Hoboken. Given that Smith is said to have built more than 100 ships in the course of his career, another 60 or more were presumably built by him at Ossining. As scant record of these latter vessels has been found, probably they were mostly small watercraft of little individual historic interest such as Hudson River sloops. (Note: Sloop building was a common activity for ship carpenters and others in the towns and villages along the Hudson River, and deep draft vessels cannot be launched on the upper Hudson. Fairburn also notes that in 1849, Smith "had no former experiences in building fast sizeable ships".)

Ships built at Hoboken, New Jersey, by Isaac C. Smith (1849–53) and Isaac C. Smith & Son (1853–55)
Name(s) (Note: Name=name of ship. Where a ship had more than one name in the course of its career, the later names are presented in chronological order, with each name followed by a two-digit number (in superscript) representing the last two digits of the year in which the rename took place (where known). Names followed by a "y" (in superscript) are yard names.)	Type	Yr. (Note: Yr.=year of ship launch. Ships are listed by date of launch, with the exception of the unnamed ship built for W. W. De Forrest & Co. in 1851, and the 1853 steamboat Rockland, for both of which only the year of launch is known.)	Ton. (Note: Ton.=ship tonnage. In some cases, tonnages may only be approximate as they are sourced to reports in contemporaneous periodicals made prior to the ship's official measurement.)	Engine (Note: Engine=engine manufacturer. Abbreviations as follows: Birbeck = Birbeck's iron works; Phoenix = Phoenix Iron Works; West Street = West Street Foundry. All engine manufacturers were based in New York. Fields in this column with a dash (——) denote that the vessel had no engine. Fields left blank indicate that the engine builder is unknown.)	Ordered by (Note: Party that ordered the ship. This is usually the owner but is sometimes the operator, or an agent of either. Contemporaneous newspaper sources rarely state to which category a named party belongs. Abbreviations in this column: RR = Railroad; TC = Transportation Company.)	Intended service	Ship notes; references
Maria	Pre-clipper	1849	397	——	Charles W. Swift		"Fast sailer".
	Ship	1851	562	——	W. W. De Forrest & Co.	Argentina	
Margaret Eliza	Ship	1851	550	——	W. W. De Forrest & Co.	Argentina	
Wilson Small	Steamboat	1851	300	West Street	Wilson Small	NY–New Jersey	
Parana	Ship	1851	650	——	O. J. Hayes & Co.	Argentina	(Note: The source erroneously refers to the ship as Panama.)
Yankee Doodle ^{y}; Hurricane; Shaw-Allum ^{60+}	Extreme clipper	1851	1608	——	C. W. & A. Thomas	California	Reputedly the most extreme clipper ever built. Several fast passages including 100-day passage in 1854 from New York to San Francisco, and record 1855 run between Portsmouth, England and Calcutta, India. Laid up 1857–58, sold to British 1860, last entry in shipping registers 1876.
Camilla	Bark	1851	250	——	Gruner & Co.		"[I]n the St. Thomas trade"
Angelina Corning	Towboat	1852	102	Phoenix	Dubois & Corning		
Golden Gate	Steamboat	1852	200	West Street	Charles G. Allen et al.		
Atlas	Freight steamboat	1852	800	Belknap	Camden & Amboy RR Co.		Hull reinforced with external iron straps to support steamer's exceptionally broad beam.
Enchantress	Schooner	1852	420	——	N. L. McCready & Co.	East Coast	Early example of a 300-plus-ton schooner. Large schooners proved so economical that they eventually came to dominate coastwise merchant sail in North America, with ever-larger examples being built into the early 20th century.
Deer	Tugboat	1852	140				
Peter G. Coffin; Alexis ^{71}; Riverdale ^{79}	Steamboat	1852	350	West Street	Wilson Small	Hudson River	(Note: The source does not list Peter G. Coffin by name; as such, the only unnamed ship built by Smith in 1852 is assumed to be Peter G. Coffin.) Ran on Hudson for entire career. Damaged by boiler explosion 8 August 1880. Sunk by boiler explosion, several killed, 28 August 1883.
Rockland	Steamboat	1853	199			Rockland, ME	Rockland–Machiasport, ME, 1853–61; U.S. government charter, 1861–64; Charleston, SE service, 1864–68; snagged 1868, auctioned and evidently scrapped, 1869. (Note: Lytle and Holdcamper list the vessel as "lost" in 1869.)
Cornelia	Steamboat	1853	250	West Street	Wilson Small		(Note: Cornelia may only have been a yard name for Rockland as no trace of the former has been found in sources other than those originating from the shipyard, as listed.)
Fairy ^{y}; Walter B. Crane	Towboat	1853	100	Birbeck	Thomas Cornell		
Anglo-Celt	Towboat	1853	405	Belknap	Star Towboat Co.	New Orleans	
James Cogswell	Barge	1853	200	——	J. P. & Thomas Cumming		
Gulf Stream ^{y}; Gardiner Pike	Schooner	1853	330	——	S. C. Nelson et al.	East Coast	Early example of a 300-plus-ton schooner. See note to Enchantress above.
Gravina	Clipper	1853	820	——	Howes & Co.	China	Owned by the Loring Brothers of Málaga, Spain—sons of American expatriate George Loring—and homeported in Málaga. Sold to parties in Valparaíso, Chile, ca. 1860; still in service 1866.
Jonas Sparks	Schooner	1853	284	——	Jonas Sparks et al.		
Nondescript	Sloop	1853	60	——	Isaac C. Smith et al.		"The name is indicative of some new peculiarities in her model."
Olympia	Sloop	1854	55	——	Isaac C. Smith et al.		
Ocean Wave	Steamboat	1854	300	Birbeck	Middleton & Shrewsbury TC	NY–New Jersey	Licence restricted to freight-only in 1869 due to poor condition but owners ignored restriction. Sunk by boiler explosion 1871, 70+ killed.
Topsy	Towboat	1854	60	Birbeck	C. H. Allen & Co.	Southern U.S.	"[F]or the Southern rivers"
Tejuca	Clipper	1854	470	——	Napier & Johnson	South America	(Note: The source erroneously refers to the ship as Tessica.) (Note: The source erroneously refers to the ship as Cachuga.) Fast passage Rio de Janeiro, Brazil, to New Orleans, 1855. Sank in hurricane on transatlantic voyage 1856, most of crew saved by courageous intervention of ship Excelsior.
James Rumsey ^{y}; Paterson	Ferryboat	1854	360	Belknap	Hoboken Ferry Co.	New York	Abandoned 1874.
Pilot	Towboat	1854	200	Birbeck	W. N. Dougherty	New York Harbor	Experimental tug "built upon the elliptical principle of James K. Howe". Lost near Long Branch, NJ, 1858.
Americus	Schooner	1854	261	——	Van Brunt, Slaght et al.		(Note: The source erroneously refers to the yard as "J. Smith & Sons".)
Colonel John McRae	Schooner	1855	412	——	Shadbourne & Co.	East Coast	Three-masted schooner or "tern". Early example of 300-ton-plus schooner; see note to Enchantress above. Built for parties in Wilmington, NC.
