= Relieving tackle =

Sailing ship steering device

Relieving tackle is tackle employing one or more lines attached to a vessel's steering mechanism, to assist or substitute for the whipstaff or ship's wheel in steering the craft. This enabled the helmsman to maintain control in heavy weather, when the rudder is under more stress and requires greater effort to handle, and also to steer the vessel were the helm damaged or destroyed.

In vessels with whipstaffs (long vertical poles extending above deck, acting as a lever to move the tiller below deck), relieving lines were attached to the tiller or directly to the whipstaff. When wheels were introduced, their greater mechanical advantage lessened the need for such assistance, but relieving tackle could still be used on the tiller, located on a deck underneath the wheel. Relieving tackle was also rigged on vessels going into battle, to assist in steering in case the helm was damaged or shot away. When a storm threatened, or battle impended, the tackle would be affixed to the tiller, and hands assigned to man them. Additional tackle was available to attach directly to the rudder as surety against loss of the tiller.

The term can also refer to lines or cables attached to a vessel that has been careened (laid over to one side for maintenance). The lines passed under the hull and were secured to the opposite side, to keep the vessel from overturning further, and to aid in righting the ship when the work was finished.
