= List of shipwrecks in December 1862 =

The list of shipwrecks in December 1862 includes ships sunk, foundered, grounded, or otherwise lost during December 1862.

== 1 December ==
List of shipwrecks: 1 December 1862
Ship	State	Description
Antonio	Kingdom of Italy	The full-rigged ship was wrecked at Cap Couronne, Bouches-du-Rhône, France. Her crew were rescued. She was on a voyage from Newcastle upon Tyne, Northumberland, United Kingdom to Genoa.
Eliza Bencke	United Kingdom	The full-rigged ship ran aground on the Glasmorgan Bank, in the Irish Sea. She was on a voyage from Liverpool, Lancashire to Bombay, India.
Catherine	United Kingdom	The ship was driven ashore and wrecked at Scrabster, Caithness. Her crew were rescued. She was on a voyage from Tongue to Thurso.
Mary Rogerson	United Kingdom	The barque was abandoned in the Atlantic Ocean. She was on a voyage from London to New York, United States. She was taken in to a port in a derelict condition on 6 December.
Tom Sayers	United Kingdom	The ship sprang a leak and was abandoned in the Atlantic Ocean. She was on a voyage from South Shields, County Durham to Boston, Massachusetts, United States.

== 2 December ==
List of shipwrecks: 2 December 1862
Ship	State	Description
Alabama	United States	The full-rigged ship was wrecked in the Atlantic Ocean (40°00′N 30°20′W) with the loss of at least nine of her sixteen crew. She was on a voyage from New York to Greenock, Renfrewshire, United Kingdom.
Eliza	United Kingdom	The barque sprang a leak and sank in the Atlantic Ocean with the loss of 24 of her 26 crew. Survivors took to a lifeboat; they were rescued by the schooner Aspia (United Kingdom). Eliza was on a voyage from Liverpool, Lancashire to Montevideo, Uruguay.
Osprey	United Kingdom	The steamship ran aground on the Sizewell Bank, in the North Sea off the coast of Suffolk. She broke her propeller and sprang a leak. She was on a voyage from Hartlepool, County Durham to London. She was later refloated and taken in to Harwich, Essex.
Queen of the Bay	Confederate States of America	American Civil War, Union blockade: Chased by boats from the gunboat USS Sachem (United States Navy) while taking depth soundings in Corpus Christi Pass off Corpus Christi, Texas, the steamer ran aground on Padre Island. Her crew then prevented her from being captured by driving off the boats with small arms fire.
Sancho Panza	United Kingdom	The ship collided with another vessel and sank off the Maplin Sand, in the North Sea off the coast of Essex. She was on a voyage from Hartlepool to London. She was refloated on 5 December and taken in to Harwich, Essex.

== 3 December ==
List of shipwrecks: 3 December 1862
Ship	State	Description
Caroline	United Kingdom	The ship was wrecked on the Islote de Sancti Petri, Spain with the loss of eight of her nine crew. She was on a voyage from Great Yarmouth, Norfolk to Livorno, Italy.
Elizabeth	United Kingdom	The schooner was driven ashore near "Averne", Portugal. Her crew were rescued. She was on a voyage from London to Lisbon, Portugal.
Elizabeth	United Kingdom	The ship ran aground at Dromore, Ireland. She was on a voyage from Taganrog, Russia to Falmouth, Cornwall. She was later refloated and taken in to Passage West, County Cork.
Fortuna	Norway	The barque collided with Thames (United Kingdom) and foundered in the English Channel off Folkestone, Kent, United Kingdom.
Gutenburg	Sweden	The schooner ran aground at the mouth of the River Tay and capsized. Her crew survived. She was on a voyage from Riga, Russia to Dundee, Forfarshire, United Kingdom.
Osprey	United Kingdom	The schooner ran aground at the mouth of the River Tay and was wrecked. Her six crew were rescued by the Buddon Ness Lifeboat. She was refloated on 24 December and taken in to the River Tay.
Triumph	United Kingdom	The ship was abandoned in the Atlantic Ocean. Her crew were rescued by Florence (United Kingdom). Triumph was on a voyage from Liverpool, Lancashire to Newfoundland, British North America.

== 4 December ==
List of shipwrecks: 4 December 1862
Ship	State	Description
Apollo	Norway	The barque capsized at Grimsby, Lincolnshire, United Kingdom. She was righted on 9 December with the loss of a crew member.
Claridia	United Kingdom	The ship ran aground off Sunderland, County Durham. She was refloated and put in to the Firth of Forth in a waterlogged condition.
Melbourne	United Kingdom	The steamship was wrecked at Buffelshoek, Cape Colony. She was on a voyage from Shanghai, CHina to London.
Sophia	Norway	The schooner struck a sunken rock and sank off Burrafirth, Shetland Islands, United Kingdom with the loss of three of her six crew. She was on a voyage from Newcastle upon Tyne, Northumberland, United Kingdom to Kristiansand.
Stephen Huntley	United Kingdom	The brig was abandoned in the North Sea. Her crew were rescued by the brig Elizabeth Fergusson (United Kingdom).

== 5 December ==
List of shipwrecks: 5 December 1862
Ship	State	Description
Agenoria	United Kingdom	The ship departed from Newcastle upon Tyne, Northumberland for Bergen, Norway. Possibly sighted on 18 December, no further trace, presumed foundered with the loss of all hands.
Alicia	Confederate States of America	American Civil War, Union blockade: The schooner was captured and destroyed in Jupiter Inlet, Florida, by the gunboat USS Sagamore.
Anna	(United Kingdom of Great Britain and Ireland) British North America	The schooner was driven ashore near the South Lighthouse, County Antrim. She was on a voyage from St. John's, Newfoundland to Greenock, Renfrewshire. She was refloated and resumed her voyage.
Levanter	(United Kingdom of Great Britain and Ireland) British North America	The ship was abandoned in the Atlantic Ocean. Her crew were rescued by Dante (United Kingdom). Levanter was on a voyage from Saint John, New Brunswick to Liverpool, Lancashire.
Staindrop	United Kingdom	The brig foundered off Ouessant, Finistère, France. She was on a voyage from Bordeaux, Gironde, France to Sunderland, County Durham.
Onderneeming	Netherlands	The ship departed from Harlingen, Friesland for Dundee, Forfarshire, United Kingdom. No further trace, presumed foundered in the North Sea with the loss of all hands.
William France	United Kingdom	The steamship collided with the steamship Albert Dumont (France and sank off the Nore. Her crew were rescued by Albert Dumont. William France was on a voyage from Liverpool, Lancashire to London.
Unidentified vessels	Confederate States of America	American Civil War, Union blockade: Howitzer boats from the armed sidewheel paddle steamers USS General Putnam and USS Mahaska (both United States Navy) destroyed a schooner, two sloops, and several boats in branches of the Severn River in Virginia.
Unknown	Unknown	American Civil War:The schooner was sunk by USS Sagamore off Jupiter Inlet, Florida.
Unknown	Unknown	American Civil War:The schooner was burned by USS Sagamore off Jupiter Inlet, Florida.

== 6 December ==
List of shipwrecks: 6 December 1862
Ship	State	Description
Ann	United Kingdom	The brigantine was driven ashore at Larne, County Antrim. Her crew survived.
Dumbarton	United Kingdom	The brig was wrecked on the west coast of Newfoundland.
Eleanor	(United Kingdom of Great Britain and Ireland) British North America	The barque was abandoned in the Atlantic Ocean. Her crew were rescued by Mary Anna (United Kingdom). Eleanor was on a voyage from New York to Liverpool.
Eliza	France	The lugger was wrecked near Saint Michael's Mount, Cornwall, United Kingdom. Her five crew were rescued by a pilot boat. She was on a voyage from Swansea, Glamorgan, United Kingdom to Bordeaux, Gironde.
Henry Everfast	United Kingdom	The sailing barge was driven ashore at Aldeburgh, Suffolk. She was refloated and towed in to Lowestoft, Suffolk.
Liebnitz	Bremen	The ship was abandoned in the Atlantic Ocean. Her crew were rescued by the barque Union (Bremen). Liebnitz was on a voyage from New York, United States to Bristol, Gloucestershire, United Kingdom.
Springfield	United Kingdom	The ship was driven ashore on the south east coast of Prince Edward Island, British North America. She was on a voyage from Shediac, New Brunswick, British North America to an Irish port. She was consequently condemned.

== 7 December ==
List of shipwrecks: 7 December 1862
Ship	State	Description
Attila	United Kingdom	The ship foundered in the North Sea 60 nautical miles (110 km) east south east of Great Yarmouth, Norfolk. Her crew were rescued.
Endeavour	United Kingdom	The ship collided with Catherine (United Kingdom) and sank off Robin Hoods Bay, Yorkshire. Her crew were rescued by Catherine Endeavour was on a voyage from Hartlepool, County Durham to Wells-next-the-Sea, Norfolk.
Maria	United Kingdom	The schooner struck the Varne Sandbank, in the English Channel. She was on a voyage from Dunkirk, Nord to Saint-Vaast-la-Hougue, Manche. She was assisted in to Dover, Kent, United Kingdom in a sinking condition.
Norna	United Kingdom	The ship departed from Danzig for Newcastle upon Tyne, Northumberland. No further trace, presumed foundered with the loss of all hands.
Sostrate	Denmark	The ship was driven ashore at Tynemouth, Northumberland, United Kingdom and severely damaged. She was on a voyage from Copenhagen to Newcastle upon Tyne, Northumberland. She was refloated and taken in to North Shields, Northumberland.

== 8 December ==
List of shipwrecks: 8 December 1862
Ship	State	Description
Agostina	United Kingdom	The ship was wrecked.
Gasparo	Austrian Empire	The ship sank in a squall at "Ponata". Her crew were rescued.
General Pellisier	United Kingdom	The ship collided with a brig off Flamborough Head, Yorkshire and was abandoned by her crew. She was on a voyage from South Shields, County Durham to London. General Pellisier was towed in to Grimsby, Lincolnshire by the barque Perseverance (United Kingdom).
Johanna	Netherlands	The ship foundered. Her crew were rescued. She was on a voyage from Livorno, Italy to Bristol, Gloucestershire, United Kingdom.
John Bull	United Kingdom	The Mersey Flat struck a submerged object and sank in the River Leven.
Lake City	United States	American Civil War: The 171-ton sternwheel paddle steamer was burned by Confederate guerrillas on the Mississippi River at Carson's Landing, Arkansas.
Mary Ann	United Kingdom	The sloop was driven ashore and wrecked at Warkworth, Northumberland. Her crew were rescued. She was on a voyage from Newcastle upon Tyne to Lindisfarne.
Tramp	United Kingdom	The schooner was driven ashore at "Nasunde". Her crew were rescued. She was on a voyage from Stockholm, Sweden to London.
William	United Kingdom	The ship sank at Leith, Lothian. She was on a voyage from Sunderland, County Durham to Leith.
Unnamed	United Kingdom	The brig capsized in the Atlantic Ocean 60 nautical miles (110 km) south of Monhegan, Maine, United States. Six crew were rescued by Abner Taylor (United States).

== 9 December ==
List of shipwrecks: 9 December 1862
Ship	State	Description
Dolphin	New Zealand	Cutter wrecked off Quail Island, Lyttelton Harbour, New Zealand
Emma	France	The ship was driven ashore between "Poulignen" and Batz-sur-Mer, Loire-Inférieure. She was on a voyage from Cardiff, Glamorgan, United Kingdom to Saint-Nazaire, Loire-Inférieure.
Johannes	Hamburg	The brig was driven ashore near Hamburg. She was on a voyage from Liverpool, Lancashire, United Kingdom to Hamburg.
Melita	United Kingdom	The ship was damaged by fire at London.
Prima Donna	United Kingdom	The schooner ran aground at Blackness Point, Stirlingshire. She was on a voyage from Bahia, Brazil to Hamburg. She was refloated with assistance from a steamship and towed in to Grangemouth, Stirlingshire.
San Giovanni	Kingdom of Italy	The barque ran aground on the Goodwin Sands, Kent. She was on a voyage from Hartlepool, County Durham, United Kingdom to Genoa. She was refloated and towed in to Ramsgate, Kent by Phoenix (United Kingdom).
Simon	United Kingdom	The ship put in to Havre de Grâce, Seine-Inférieure, France in a sinking condition. She was on a voyage from Liverpool, Lancashire to the Rio Peguá.
Sperwer	Netherlands	The schooner struck the pier and sank at Livorno, Italy. She was on a voyage from Arkhangelsk, Russia to Livorno.
Tung Zu	China	The ship was driven ashore at the mouth of the Yangtze Kiang. She was on a voyage from London to Shanghai. She was wrecked in a gale shortly afterwards.

== 10 December ==
List of shipwrecks: 10 December 1862
Ship	State	Description
Lowe	United Kingdom	The ship ran aground on the Cockle Sand, in the North Sea off the coast of Norfolk. She was on a voyage from Yarmouth, Isle of Wight to Hull, Yorkshire. She was refloated and towed in to Great Yarmouth, Norfolk in a leaky condition.
Maeblomsten	Sweden	The ship was wrecked at Kämpinge, near Falsterbo. Her crew were rescued. She was on a voyage from Gävle to London, United Kingdom.
Menemon Sanford, or Memnorium Sanford	United States	American Civil War: Carrying 500 soldiers of the 156th New York Infantry Regiment (Union Army), the 905-ton steamer was wrecked and broke up without loss of life on Carysfort Reef off the Florida Keys 1.5 nautical miles (2.8 kilometres) south by west of Carysfort Reef Light. Blackstone (flag unknown) and the barque USS Gemsbok (United States Navy) rescued everyone on board. Her engine was salvaged.
Najaden	Sweden	The ship was driven ashore on Utlängan. She was on a voyage from Sundsvall to Bristol, Gloucestershire, United Kingdom.
William Charles	United Kingdom	The ship was driven ashore at Falsterbo, Sweden. She was on a voyage from Danzig to London.

== 11 December ==
List of shipwrecks: 11 December 1862
Ship	State	Description
Arwenack	United Kingdom	The schooner was wrecked in Mount's Bay with the loss of all hands.
Rosedale	United Kingdom	The ship ran aground in the Straits de Fuca. She consequently put in to "Victoria", Virgin Islands in a waterlogged condition.
Unidentified schooner	Unknown	American Civil War, Union blockade: A schooner was driven ashore on the coast of Florida at the St. Johns River by the sidewheel paddle steamer USS Bienville (United States Navy).

== 12 December ==
List of shipwrecks: 12 December 1862
Ship	State	Description
USS Cairo	United States Navy	American Civil War: The river gunboat struck a Confederate mine in the Yazoo River in Mississippi, Confederate States of America, and sank. The wreck was raised in 1964 and put on display in the Vicksburg National Military Park, Vicksburg, Mississippi, (32°22′33″N 90°52′0″W).
Cossack	United Kingdom	The steamship ran aground at Pillau, Prussia. She was on a voyage from Pillau to Hull, Yorkshire. She was refloated the next day and taken in to Pillau.
Fanny	United Kingdom	The schooner was driven ashore east of Calais, France. She was on a voyage from Hamburg to Liverpool, Lancashire.
Sea	United Kingdom	The ship ran aground on the Foreness Rock, Margate, Kent. She was on a voyage from Poole, Dorset to London She was refloated the next day and taken in to Margate.

== 13 December ==
List of shipwrecks: 13 December 1862
Ship	State	Description
Agatha Geertruida	Netherlands	The ship was driven ashore north of Fredrikshavn, Denmark. She was on a voyage from Ängelholm, Sweden to London, United Kingdom.
Ahivena	Netherlands	The ship was wrecked at Gunwalloe, Cornwall, United Kingdom with the loss of all hands.
Britannia	United Kingdom	The brig ran aground on the Newcombe Sand, in the North Sea off the coast of Suffolk and sank. Her crew survived. She was on a voyage from West Hartlepool, County Durham to Boulogne, Pas-de-Calais, France.
Countess of Lisburn	United Kingdom	The smack was wrecked at Cardigan. Her three crew were rescued by the Cardigan Lifeboat ( (United Kingdom of Great Britain and Ireland) Royal National Lifeboat Institution).
Countess of Westmoreland	United Kingdom	The brig ran aground on the Newcombe Sand and sank. Her crew survived. She was on a voyage from South Shields, County Durham to London.
Emanuel	United States	The ship ran aground on the Batten Reef, off the coast of Devon, United Kingdom and sank.
Karen Marie	France	The ship was driven ashore on Skagen, Denmark. She was on a voyage from Hartlepool, County Durham, United Kingdom to Korsør, Denmark. She was refloated the next day.
Margaretha Margetson	United Kingdom	The ship departed from Antwerp, Belgium for London. No further trace, presumed foundered with the loss of all hands.
Maria	Peru	The barque was scuttled in the Atlantic Ocean. Her twelve crew took to two boats. Six of them were rescued by King of Tyrie (United Kingdom), those in the other boat were reported missing. Maria was on a voyage from Bahia, Brazil to London.
Thistle	United Kingdom	The steamship ran aground on the Anegada Reefs, Bahamas. She was on a voyage from Liverpool, Lancashire to Nassau, Bahamas. She was refloated and taken in to Saint Thomas, Virgin Islands in a leaky condition.

== 14 December ==
List of shipwrecks: 14 December 1862
Ship	State	Description
Badger State	United States	The 127-ton sternwheel paddle steamer was stranded on the Mississippi River at Chain of Rocks, Missouri.
Carlisle	United Kingdom	The sloop ran aground and was scuttled at Dumfries. She was on a voyage from "Roscal" to Silloth, Cumberland.
Cruiser	United Kingdom	The ship was driven ashore at Wells-next-the-Sea, Norfolk.
Greek Slave	United Kingdom	The brigantine was driven ashore at Wells-next-the-Sea. She was on a voyage from Hartlepool, County Durham to London.
Isabella	United Kingdom	The ship ran aground on the Longsand, in the North Sea off the coast of Essex. She was on a voyage from Rio de Janeiro, Brazil to London. She was refloated.

== 15 December ==
List of shipwrecks: 15 December 1862
Ship	State	Description
Adelphi	United Kingdom	The ship was severely damaged by fire at Shadwell, Middlesex.
Blue Bell	United Kingdom	The ship ran aground at Schiedam, South Holland, Netherlands and was severely damaged.
Claes	(Russian Empire) Grand Duchy of Finland	The ship was driven ashore on "Flatoskar", Norway and was wrecked. Her crew were rescued. She was on a voyage from Hartlepool, County Durham, United Kingdom to Stockholm, Sweden.
Diana	United Kingdom	The brig ran aground on the Corton Sand, in the North Sea off the coast of Suffolk.
Emma Augusta	Stralsund	The schooner was driven ashore near Mollösund, Sweden. She was on a voyage from London, United Kingdom to Stralsund.
Lina	Greifswald	The ship ran aground off "Folgeskar", Norway and was wrecked. Her crew were rescued. She was on a voyage from Hartlepool to Wolgast, Grand Duchy of Mecklenburg-Schwerin.
Marina	United Kingdom	The brig was abandoned, sinking, in the Atlantic Ocean (55°N 17°W). Her crew were rescued by the steamship Bohemian (United Kingdom). Marina was on a voyage from Montreal to Aberdeen (or Dundee, per one source) with grain as cargo.
Thor	Norway	The ship was driven ashore and wrecked at Trondheim.
Waterlily	United Kingdom	The schooner foundered 1 nautical mile (1.9 km) west north west of Lamb Island, Lothian. She was on a voyage from Sunderland, County Durham to Leith, Lothian.
Unidentified schooner	Confederate States of America	American Civil War, Union blockade: A schooner, carrying a cargo of cotton, was destroyed by her crew after she ran aground on Sand Island, Alabama while trying to exit Mobile Bay during a gale.

== 16 December ==
List of shipwrecks: 16 December 1862
Ship	State	Description
Margaret	United Kingdom	The schooner was wrecked on Inishbofin, County Donegal.
Queen of the Lakes	United Kingdom	The ship struck the Brazil Rock and was abandoned by her 22 crew. They were rescued by Helen Campbell (United Kingdom). Queen of the Lakes was on a voyage from Liverpool, Lancashire to Portland, Maine, United States. She was discovered on 19 December 80 nautical miles (150 km) off Cape Sable Island, Nova Scotia, British North America by two schooners, which each put three crew aboard. They attempted to take her in to Halifax, Nova Scotia, but she foundered off that port on 31 December. Her salvage crew survived.

== 17 December ==
List of shipwrecks: 17 December 1862
Ship	State	Description
Colorado	United Kingdom	The ship was driven onto Cayo Cruz, off the coast of Cuba. She was on a voyage from Liverpool, Lancashire to Havana, Cuba.
Devon	United Kingdom	The schooner departed from Montrose, Forfarshire for Sunderland, County Durham. No further trace, presumed foundered with the loss of all hands.
Duke of Malakoff	United Kingdom	The ship was abandoned in the Pacific Ocean. She was on a voyage from the Chincha Islands, Chile to a French port.
Joachim Alwardt	Rostock	The brig sank. Her crew were rescued. She was on a voyage from Newcastle upon Tyne, Northumberland, United Kingdom to Rostock.

== 18 December ==
List of shipwrecks: 18 December 1862
Ship	State	Description
Moore	United Kingdom	The brig foundered in the North Sea 10 nautical miles (19 km) south of the Dudgeon Lightship ( Trinity House). Her six crew were rescued by the smacks Osprey and Planet (both United Kingdom). Moore was on a voyage from Seaham, County Durham to London.
Palmer	United Kingdom	The brig was driven ashore and wrecked at Fleetwood, Lancashire. Her crew were rescued. She was on a voyage from Lough Swilly to Workington, Cumberland.

== 19 December ==
List of shipwrecks: 19 December 1862
Ship	State	Description
Bowes	United Kingdom	The brig was driven ashore and severely damaged at Ravenglass, Cumberland. Her crew were rescued. She was on a voyage from Quebec City, Province of Canada, British North America to Workington, Cumberland. She was a total loss.
Black Agnes	United Kingdom	The schooner was severely damaged at Great Yarmouth, Norfolk.
Brothers	United Kingdom	The Mersey Flat sank in the River Mersey.
Caithness-shire	United Kingdom	The schooner was driven onto a sandbank and severely damaged at Thurso, Caithness.
Catherine	United Kingdom	The smack was wrecked at Scrabster, Caithness. Her crew were rescued. She was on a voyage from Tongue, Sutherland to Thurso, Caithness.
Eagle	United Kingdom	The schooner was driven ashore and wrecked at Thurso. Her crew were rescued.
Elfin	United Kingdom	The schooner was driven ashore at Thurso. She was on a voyage from Newcastle upon Tyne, Northumberland to Dublin. She had become a wreck by 24 December.
Energy	United Kingdom	The ship collided with Findlay (United Kingdom off Lowestoft, Suffolk and was abandoned. Two of her ten crew were rescued by Findlay, the remainder reached land in a boat.
Erromango	United Kingdom	The ship was driven ashore near Fort Matilda, Renfrewshire. She was on a voyage from Glasgow, Renfrewshire to Matanzas, Cuba. She had been refloated by 24 December and taken in to Greenock, Renfrewshire for repairs.
Euphemia	United Kingdom	The schooner ran aground on the Sow and Pigs Rocks, off the coast of Northumberland. She was on a voyage from the River Tyne to Arbroath, Forfarshire. She was refloated and taken in to Blyth, Northumberland in a leaky condition.
Excellent	United Kingdom	The smack collided with a schooner and foundered off Spurn Point, Yorkshire. Her six crew took to a boat; they were rescued by the schooner Buchan (United Kingdom).
Hopwood	United Kingdom	The Mersey Flat was driven ashore near Hoylake, Lancashire.
Inverkeithing	United Kingdom	The sloop was driven ashore and wrecked at Ardrossan, Ayrshire. Her crew were rescued.
Julia	United Kingdom	The ship foundered off Eday, Orkney Islands. Her crew were rescued.
Juliana Louisa	Netherlands	The ship was driven ashore at Wijk aan Zee, North Holland. She was on a voyage from London, United Kingdom to the Koogerpolder.
Kate	United Kingdom	The ship foundered off Lowestoft. Her crew were rescued by Alert (United Kingdom). Kate was on a voyage from Sunderland, County Durham to Aldeburgh, Suffolk.
Matilda	United Kingdom	The smack was driven ashore and wrecked at Thurso, Caithness.
New Whim	United Kingdom	The ship was driven ashore at Ryde, Isle of Wight. She was refloated and taken in to Portsmouth, Hampshire in a leaky condition.
Nostra Señora del Carmen	Spain	The ship was wrecked on Stronsay, Orkney Islands, United Kingdom with the loss of four of her crew. She was on a voyage from Bilbao to Bergen, Norway.
Omega	United Kingdom	The brig was wrecked in the Rabbit Islands, Sutherland with the loss of all four crew. She was on a voyage from an American port to Dundee, Forfarshire.
Parrsboro	United Kingdom	The ship was driven ashore at Bowmore, Islay, Inner Hebrides. She was on a voyage from Liverpool, Lancashire to Galway. Parrsboro was refloated on 18 January 1863, but drove ashore again.
Pedestrian	United Kingdom	The schooner was driven ashore and wrecked at Peterhead, Aberdeenshire. Her crew and the ship's dog were rescued by rocket apparatus.
Planet	United Kingdom	The ship was driven ashore at Helsingør, Denmark and was subsequently destroyed by fire. She was on a voyage from Memel, Prussia to Wisbech, Cambridgeshire.
Pomona	United Kingdom	The steamboat was run into by Louisa Crawshay (United Kingdom) and sank in the River Tyne. All on board were rescued.
Rialto	United Kingdom	The ship was driven ashore and wrecked at Turnberry Point, Ayrshire. Her crew were rescued. She was on a voyage from New York, United States to the Clyde.
Sisters	United Kingdom	The schooner was abandoned off Thurso, Caithness. Her three crew were rescued by the Thurso Lifeboat.
St. Vincent	France	The chasse-marée was driven ashore at "Rungles", Finistère.
Sunderland	Norway	The schooner was driven ashore and wrecked at Thurso. Her crew were rescued. She was on a voyage from Arundel, Sussex to Wick, Caithness, United Kingdom.
True Love	United Kingdom	The ship sank at Middlesbrough, Yorkshire.
United Kingdom	United Kingdom	The steamship ran aground in the Clyde. She was on a voyage from Glasgow, Renfrewshire to Portland, Maine, United States. She was refloated
Worsdale	United Kingdom	The ship was driven ashore at St. Bees Head, Cumberland. She was on a voyage from Whitehaven, Cumberland to Dublin.
Unidentified vessels	Confederate States of America	American Civil War: A sloop and nine boats were burned at the head of Queen's Creek in Virginia by the gunboat USS General Putnam and the crew of a howitzer boat from the armed sidewheel paddle steamer USS Mahaska (all United States Navy).

== 20 December ==
List of shipwrecks: 20 December 1862
Ship	State	Description
Ajax	United Kingdom	The ship was wrecked on Menorca, Spain. She was on a voyage from Livorno, Italy to Woolwich, Kent.
Alice	United Kingdom	The schooner was driven ashore and wrecked at Dunstanburgh Castle, Northumberland. Her crew were rescued.
Bethlehem	United Kingdom	The ship was wrecked off Eierland, North Holland, Netherlands with the loss of all nine crew. She was on a voyage from Hull, Yorkshire to Lisbon, Portugal.
Boxer	United Kingdom	The ship was driven ashore in Lough Swilly and was scuttled. She was on a voyage from Danzig to Ballyshannon, County Donegal.
Cassibelanus	United Kingdom	The ship was driven ashore at Sulina, Ottoman Empire. She was refloated the next day and taken in to the Danube in a severely damaged condition.
Champion	United Kingdom	The brigantine was wrecked on the Scarweather Sands, in the Bristol Channel. All ten people on board were rescued by the Porthcawl Lifeboat. She was on a voyage from New Brunswick, British North America to Liverpool, Lancashire, England. She was refloated and towed in to Swansea, Glamorgan in a waterlogged condition.
Celestine	United Kingdom	The ship was driven ashore at Scarborough, Yorkshire. Her crew were rescued by the Coastguard using rocket apparatus. She was on a voyage from Burntisland, Fife to Middlesbrough, Yorkshire. She was refloated on 25 January 1863 and taken in to Whitby, Yorkshire.
Cumberland	United Kingdom	The brig was wrecked in the Swin. Her crew were rescued.
Eagle	United Kingdom	The fishing smack sank in the River Wyre.
Earl of Glasgow	United Kingdom	The ship was driven ashore at Killybegs, County Donegal. She was on a voyage from Milford Haven, Pembrokeshire to Barrow-in-Furness, Lancashire.
Eliza Robinson	United Kingdom	The ship was wrecked on the Barrows Sand, in the North Sea off the coast of Essex. Her fifteen crew took to two boats. Five in the jolly boat were presumed to have been lost. Ten in the longboat reached Cap Gris-Nez, Pas-de-Calais, France. They were rescued.
Excellent	United Kingdom	The smack was run into by a brig and was abandoned in the North Sea 8 nautical miles (15 km) off Spurn Point, Yorkshire. Her six crew were rescued by the schooner Buchan (United Kingdom).
Florence	United Kingdom	The ship was beached at Tranmere, Cheshire. She was on a voyage from Kronstadt, Russia to Liverpool. She was refloated and towed in to Liverpool.
George	United Kingdom	The barque was abandoned in the North Sea off the coast of Forfarshire. Her fifteen crew survived. She was on a voyage from Dundee to London. She was taken in to Montrose, Forfarshire the next day. She was on a voyage from Tayport, Fife to Havana, Cuba.
Gipsy	United Kingdom	The brig was wrecked on the Barrows Sand. Her five crew took to a boat and reached the wreck of Eliza Robinson (United Kingdom). They subsequently took to two of that vessels' boats. Two in the jolly boat were presumed to have been lost. Three in the longboat reached Cap Gris-Nez and were rescued. Gipsy was on a voyage from South Shields to Barking, Essex
Industry	United Kingdom	The ship was driven ashore and wrecked at Donna Nook, Lincolnshire. Her crew were rescued.
Isabel	United Kingdom	The ship was beached at Bangor, County Down. She was on a voyage from Liverpool to Belfast, County Antrim. She was refloated on 3 January 1863 and taken in to Belfast.
Lady Emma	United Kingdom	The ship capsized off the Barrows Sand and was abandoned by her crew, who were rescued by the steamship Countess of Lonsdale (United Kingdom). Lady Emma was on a voyage from Maldon, Essex to London.
Lifeguard	United Kingdom	The steamship departed from Newcastle upon Tyne for London. Later sighted off Scarborough, North Riding of Yorkshire. She subsequently foundered off Flamborough Head, Yorkshire with the loss of all 53 people on board.
Matilda	United Kingdom	American Civil War: The ship was wrecked near Cabañas, Cuba whilst under a prize crew from "USS Kelabay" (United States Navy). She was on a voyage from Matanzas, Cuba to Sisal, and Matamoros, Mexico.
Moore	United Kingdom	The ship brig foundered in the North Sea off the coast of Yorkshire. Her crew were rescued by the smack Osprey (United Kingdom).
Orifga	United Kingdom	The ship was wrecked at the Kyle of Tongue, Sutherland. She was on a voyage from Montreal, Province of Canada, British North America to Dundee, Forfarshire.
Orion	United Kingdom	The ship ran aground on the Barrows Sand. Her crew were rescued by the steamship Countess of Lonsdale (United Kingdom). Arion was on a voyage from South Shields, County Durham to Rochester, Kent.
Oshawa	United States	The full-rigged ship foundered off Tiree, Inner Hebrides, United Kingdom. She was on a voyage from Liverpool to Philadelphia, Pennsylvania.
Petra Dorothea	Duchy of Holstein	The galiot foundered 3 nautical miles (5.6 km) off Bergen, Norway. She was on a voyage from Hartlepool, County Durham to Neustadt in Holstein.
Pride of Canada	United Kingdom	The ship ran aground on the Pluckington Bank, in Liverpool Bay. She was on a voyage from Quebec City, Province of Canada, British North America to Liverpool. She was refloated and taken in to Liverpool in a leaky condition.
Rebecca	United Kingdom	The brigantine was wrecked on the Maplin Sand, in the North Sea off the coast of Essex. Her crew were rescued.
Sarah	United Kingdom	The barque was wrecked on the East Burrows Sand, in the North Sea off the coast of Essex. Her crew were rescued by the smack Pheasant (United Kingdom).
Telegraph	United Kingdom	The brigantine was driven ashore in Baylagh Bay. She was on a voyage from Galway to Liverpool.
Traveller	United Kingdom	The brig was driven ashore on Walney Island, Lancashire. She was on a voyage from Whitehaven, Cumberland to Dublin.
Union	United Kingdom	The sloop was driven into the sloop Curlew (United Kingdom) and sank in Abercastle Creek, Pembrokeshire. Her crew were rescued by Curlew. Union was on a voyage from Porthgain to Haverfordwest.
Unity	United Kingdom	The Yorkshire Billyboy was driven ashore and wrecked at Herne Bay, Kent. Her crew were rescued. She was on a voyage from London to Great Yarmouth.
Vine	United Kingdom	The schooner was severely damaged at Great Yarmouth.
Vulcan	United Kingdom	The schooner was severely damaged at Great Yarmouth.
Wasdale	United Kingdom	The ship was driven ashore at St Bees Head, Cumberland. She was on a voyage from Whitehaven, Cumberland to Dublin.
Unidentified schooner	Confederate States of America	American Civil War, Union blockade: A schooner, in ballast, was burned on the Piankatank River in Virginia to prevent her capture by the approaching gunboat USS Currituck, armed sidewheel paddle steamer USS Ella, and armed tug USS Anacostia (all United States Navy).
Unidentified vessels	Confederate States of America	American Civil War: A 30-ton sloop, a scow, and eight boats were destroyed on Fillbates Creek in Virginia by the armed sidewheel paddle steamer USS Mahaska (United States Navy).

== 21 December ==
List of shipwrecks: 21 December 1862
Ship	State	Description
Aid	United Kingdom	The ship was driven ashore at "Land's End". She was refloated on 22 January 1863 and taken in to Whitby, Yorkshire.
Amity	United Kingdom	The ship foundered off the Galloper Sand, in the English Channel off the coast of Sussex. Her crew were rescued by Admiral Nelson ( (United Kingdom of Great Britain and Ireland) Guernsey).
Ann Paterson	United Kingdom	The barque ran aground at Dover, Kent and was holed by her anchor and sank. She was on a voyage from Hartlepool, County Durham to Newcastle upon Tyne, Northumberland. She was refloated the next day.
Claudine	Flag unknown	The ship was driven ashore at Egmond aan Zee, North Holland, Netherlands.
Claus Thomsen	Sweden	The ship ran aground on the Newcombe Sand, in the North Sea off the coast of Suffolk, United Kingdom. She was on voyage from Gävle to Marseille, Bouches-du-Rhône, France. She was refloated and towed in to Lowestoft, Suffolk.
Conrad	United Kingdom	The ship sank south of "Yanteland" with the loss of six of her crew. She was on a voyage from Sunderland, County Durham to Palermo, Sicily, Italy.
Deux Sœurs	France	The ship was driven ashore and wrecked at Boulogne, Pas-de-Calais. Her crew survived. She was on a voyage from Newcastle upon Tyne to Santander, Spain.
Duke of Buccleuch	United Kingdom	The brig was driven ashore and wrecked at Robin Hoods Bay, Yorkshire. Her six crew were rescued by the Whitby Lifeboat. She was on a voyage from Aberdeen to London.
Effort	United Kingdom	The schooner was wrecked at Penrhos, Anglesey with the loss of five of her six crew. The survivor was rescued by the Holyhead Lifeboat. She was on a voyage from Liverpool, Lancashire to Lisbon, Portugal.
Eliza	United Kingdom	The collier, a brig, foundered in the North Sea. Her crew were rescued by a Norwegian barque. She was on a voyage from North Shields, Northumberland to London.
Elizabeth	United Kingdom	The ship was driven ashore at Pakefield, Suffolk. Her crew were rescued. She was on a voyage from London to Hartlepool, County Durham. She subsequently became a wreck.
Francis	United Kingdom	The ship ran aground on the Boston Knock, off the coast of Lincolnshire. She was on a voyage from Hull, Yorkshire to King's Lynn, Norfolk. She was refloated on 23 December and resumed her voyage.
Gem	United Kingdom	The ship was abandoned in the North Sea off Southwold, Suffolk. Her crew survived.
George	United Kingdom	The ship was abandoned in the North Sea. She was on a voyage from Dundee, Forfarshire to Havana, Cuba.
Hero	United Kingdom	The smack was driven ashore in the Swin.
Highland Brigade	United Kingdom	The barque ran aground at Holyhead, Anglesey. She was refloated with the assistance of a tug and towed in to Holyhead.
Hoffnung	Kingdom of Hanover	The koff ran aground off Fredrikshavn, Denmark and was wrecked. She was on a voyage from Nyköping, Sweden to London.
Isabella Grindley	United Kingdom	The schooner ran aground on the Herd Sand, in the North Sea off the coast of County Durham. Her crew were rescued by the South Shields Lifeboat. She was on a voyage from Sunderland, County Durham to Montrose, Forfarshire. She subsequently broke up.
Jane	United Kingdom	The schooner collided with another vessel and became leaky. She was towed in to Dover, where she ran aground.
Jane Catherine	United Kingdom	The ship was wrecked at Dunkirk, Nord, France. Her crew were rescued. She was on a voyage from Newcastle upon Tyne, Northumberland to Plymouth, Devon.
Johanna Isabella	United Kingdom	The schooner capsized off Redcar, Yorkshire with the loss of all hands.
John and Edwin	United Kingdom	The brig sank off the Columbine Sand, off the north Kent coast. Her crew were rescued.
John May	United Kingdom	The ship was driven ashore at Rye, Sussex. She was refloated on 23 December and taken in to Rye in a severely leaky condition.
Julia	United Kingdom	The ship was driven ashore on the coast of Norfolk. She was on a voyage from Seaham, County Durham to Wisbech, Cambridgeshire. She was refloated and taken in to King's Lynn, Norfolk in a leaky condition.
Lady Williamson	United Kingdom	The brig was beached at Skipsea, Yorkshire and broke up with the loss of four of her crew. She was on a voyage from South Shields, County Durham to London.
Little Aggie	United Kingdom	The schooner was driven ashore and wrecked at Low Hauxley, Northumberland. Her four crew were rescued by the Berwick Lifeboat. She was on a voyage from Berwick upon Tweed, Northumberland to Bangor.
Little Helen	United Kingdom	The ship was driven ashore at Wells-next-the-Sea, Norfolk.
Margaret	United Kingdom	The schooner was driven ashore at Sunderland, County Durham. Her crew were rescued. She was on a voyage from Dundee, Forfarshire to Sunderland.
Margaret	United Kingdom	The ship was driven ashore at Sunderland. Her crew were rescued. She was on a voyage from Aberdeen to Sunderland.
Margaret	United Kingdom	The ship was driven ashore at Groomsport, County Down. She was on a voyage from Aberdeen to Groomsport.
Mary	United Kingdom	The schooner was wrecked on the Goodwin Sands, Kent with the loss of one of her five crew. Survivors were rescued by a lifeboat and a tug. She was on a voyage from Newcastle upon Tyne, Northumberland to Quillebeuf-sur-Seine, Eure, France.
Matilde Christine	Sweden	The ship was driven ashore at Egmond aan Zee. She was on a voyage from Gothenburg to London.
Ocean Queen	United Kingdom	The ship was wrecked at Helsinki, Grand Duchy of Finland.
Phoenix	United Kingdom	The ship struck the Whiting Sand, in the North Sea off the coast of Suffolk and sank. Her crew were rescued. She was on a voyage from Newcastle upon Tyne to Teignmouth, Devon.
Royal Rose	United Kingdom	The barque was driven ashore and wrecked at Whitby, Yorkshire. Her twelve crew were rescued by the old Whitby Lifeboat. She was on a voyage from Odesa to Leith, Lothian.
Sarah	United Kingdom	The schooner was abandoned in Bridlington Bay. Her six crew survived. She was on a voyage from South Shields to London.
Sarah and Jane	United Kingdom	The ship was driven ashore at King's Lynn.
Singapore	United Kingdom	The ship was driven ashore on Ameland, Friesland, Netherlands. Her crew were rescued. She was on a voyage from Rotterdam, South Holland, Netherlands to Newcastle upon Tyne.
Sir William Pulteney	United Kingdom	The collier, a brig was driven ashore and wrecked at Boulogne. Her crew survived. She was refloated on 29 December and taken in to Boulogne in a severely damaged condition.
St. Albans	United Kingdom	The schooner foundered in the Mediterranean Sea 80 nautical miles (150 km) east north east of Malta. Her crew were rescued by the galiot Jantina Alita. St. Albans was on a voyage from Galaţi, Ottoman Empire to Queenstown, County Cork.
Teign	United Kingdom	The schooner was driven ashore at Milford Haven, Pembrokeshire.
Undine	United Kingdom	The barque was wrecked on the Sunk Sand, in the North Sea off the coast of Essex. Her crew were rescued by the brig Nautilus (United Kingdom).

== 22 December ==
List of shipwrecks: 22 December 1862
Ship	State	Description
Annabella	(United Kingdom of Great Britain and Ireland) British North America	The schooner ran aground at Bangor, County Down. She was on a voyage from Liverpool, Lancashire to Belfast, County Antrim.
Christine	United Kingdom	The ship was driven ashore on Jura, Inner Hebrides. She was on a voyage from Philadelphia, Pennsylvania, United States to Portrush, County Antrim. She was refloated and put in to Belfast, County Antrim in a leaky condition.
Clarence	United Kingdom	The ship was driven ashore at Longhope, Orkney Islands. She was on a voyage from South Shields, County Durham to Dublin and/or Waterford. She was refloated on 1 January 1863 and taken in to Stromness, Orkney Islands in a severely damaged condition.
Colestone	United Kingdom	The schooner was driven ashore at Scarborough, Yorkshire. Her crew were rescued by rocket apparatus.
Curacao	Unknown	The brig ran aground on the coast of California, United States.
Eliza	United Kingdom	The ship was wrecked at the mouth of the River Thames. Her crew were rescued.
Eliza	United Kingdom	The ship was driven ashore at Blankenberge, West Flanders, Belgium. Her crew were rescued. She was on a voyage from Sunderland, County Durham to London.
Hebe	United Kingdom	The ship was driven ashore and wrecked at Crinan, Argyllshire. She was on a voyage from Riga, Russia to Belfast.
Holkham	United Kingdom	The schooner was driven ashore at Stiffkey, Norfolk. Her crew survived. She was on a voyage from Hartlepool, County Durham to Great Yarmouth, Norfolk.
Isabella	United Kingdom	The ship was driven ashore in Bangor Bay.
Lady Lovett	United Kingdom	The schooner was abandoned in the North Sea off Scarborough, Yorkshire. Her crew were rescued by Wave (United Kingdom).
Lee	United Kingdom	The schooner ran aground on the Whiting Sand, in the North Sea off the coast of Suffolk. She was on a voyage from Dundee, Forfarshire to London. She was refloated and taken in to Harwich, Essex in a severely leaky condition.
Lillias	United Kingdom	The schooner was driven ashore and wrecked at Spittal Point, Northumberland. Her four crew were rescued, three of them by the Coast Guard using rocket apparatus. She was on a voyage from Aberdeen to Berwick upon Tweed, Northumberland.
Margaret	United Kingdom	The brig was driven ashore and severely damaged at Grainthorpe, Lincolnshire.
Maria	United Kingdom	The brig ran aground at Lowestoft. She was run into by the brigs Thomas Edward and Vivid (both United Kingdom). Maria was on a voyage from Hartlepool to London.
Marie and Joseph	France	The brig struck the Bœufs Rocks and the Luzeronde Rock, off the coast of Seine-Inférieure and was wrecked. She was on a voyage from Swansea, Glamorgan, United Kingdom to Nantes, Loire-Inférieure.
Meika	United Kingdom	The ship was driven ashore at Bootle, Lancashire. She was on a voyage from Livorno, Italy to Liverpool. She was refloated and taken in to Liverpool.
Paul Pry	United States	The 229-, 330-, or 350-ton sidewheel paddle steamer struck a rock on Alcatraz Island in San Francisco Bay and sank. She was later salvaged.
Rhoda	United Kingdom	The brig was wrecked on the Newcombe Sand, in the North Sea off the coast of Suffolk. Her crew were rescued. She was on a voyage from Amble, Northumberland to Rouen, Seine-Inférieure, France.
Rhoda	United Kingdom	The ship struck a sunken wreck and was beached at Dungeness, Kent, where she was wrecked. She was on a voyage from Amble to Rouen.
Sextant	Bremen	The barque ran aground on the West Rocks, in the North Sea off the coast of Essex. She was on a voyage from Bremen to Cardiff, Glamorgan, United Kingdom. She was refloated and taken in to Harwich in a leaky condition.
Shepherdess	United Kingdom	The ship was driven ashore and sank at Lowestoft, Suffolk. She was on a voyage from South Shields, County Durham to London. She was refloated on 24 December and taken in to Lowestoft in a leaky condition.
Sisters	United Kingdom	The sloop was wrecked at North Sunderland, County Durham. Her crew were rescued. She was on a voyage from Montrose, Forfarshire to Sunderland, County Durham.
Solferino	United Kingdom	The ship was sighted in the Indian Ocean whilst on a voyage from Akyab, Burma to London. No further trace, presumed foundered with the loss of all hands.
Thomas Edward	United Kingdom	The ship was driven on to the brig Maria (United Kingdom) and was severely damaged at Lowestoft. She was on a voyage from Newcastle upon Tyne, Northumberland to London.
Vanguard	United Kingdom	The brigantine ran aground at Lowestoft. She was on a voyage from London to Sunderland.
Virgo	United Kingdom	The ship ran aground on the Stony Binks, in the North Sea off the mouth of the Humber. She was on a voyage from Sunderland, County Durham to King's Lynn, Norfolk.
Wildcat	Unknown	The schooner ran aground in the Atlantic Ocean on or about 22 December, possibly near the Ashepoo River, on the coast of South Carolina, Confederate States of America.
William	United Kingdom	The ship foundered off East London, Cape Colony with the loss of all but two of her crew. She was on a voyage from Singapore, Straits Settlements to London.

== 23 December ==
List of shipwrecks: 23 December 1862
Ship	State	Description
Casibelanus	United Kingdom	The ship ran agrounnd in the Danube. She was refloated the next day and taken in to Sulina, Ottoman Empire.
Heligoland	United Kingdom	The ship sank off Orfordness, Suffolk. Her crew were rescued.
J. S. Parsons	United States	The ship was wrecked on "Innishadda", County Donegal, United Kingdom with the loss of six of her 28 crew. She was on a voyage from Liverpool, Lancashire, United Kingdom to New York.
Jules Sophie	France	The ship capsized and sank at Llanelly, Glamorgan, United Kingdom. She was on a voyage from Dinan, Côtes du Nord to Llanelly. She was righted and refloated.
Leander	United Kingdom	The ship was abandoned at sea. Her crew were rescued by Elizabeth Bates (United Kingdom). Leander was on a voyage from Santander, Spain to Port Talbot, Glamorgan.
Lucy Anne	United Kingdom	The smack was driven ashore and wrecked in Balzonigan Bay. Her crew were rescued.
Omni	(Russian Empire) Grand Duchy of Finland	The barque ran aground on the Lemon and Ower Sands, in the English Channel off the coast of Sussex, United Kingdom. She was on a voyage from South Shields, County Durham, United Kingdom to Naples, Italy. She was refloated and towed to Portsmouth, Hampshire, United Kingdom in a leaky condition.
Pravoslaoni	Russia	The ship foundered in the English Channel off the coast of Nord, France. She was on a voyage from Taganrog to Falmouth, Cornwall, United Kingdom and the Koogerpolder, Netherlands.
Thomas Rusbridge	United Kingdom	The brig was driven ashore on the coast of Essex. Three crew were rescued by the smack New Unity (United Kingdom) before she was refloated and sailed for London.
Tickler	(United Kingdom of Great Britain and Ireland) Guernsey	The schooner ran aground off Falmouth, Cornwall. She was on a voyage from Gallipoli, Ottoman Empire to Falmouth. She was refloated and beached at Falmouth in a waterlogged condition.
Woodville	United Kingdom	The ship was abandoned in the North Sea. Her crew were rescued. She was subsequently taken in to King's Lynn, Norfolk.

== 24 December ==
List of shipwrecks: 24 December 1862
Ship	State	Description
Fortuna	United Kingdom	The ship was driven ashore at Longhope. She was on a voyage from Clackmannan to Thurso, Caithness.
Ino	France	The ship was driven ashore at "Pierre Œil". She was on a voyage from Nantes, Loire-Inférieure to Cardiff, Glamorgan, United Kingdom. She had been refloated by 31 December.
Lucy	Bremen	The ship ran aground on the Goodwin Sands, Kent, United Kingdom. She was on a voyage from Bremen to Newcastle upon Tyne, Northumberland, United Kingdom. She was refloated and resumed her voyage.
Sultan	United Kingdom	The ship was driven ashore at Rye, Sussex. She was on a voyage from Lisbon, Portugal to Hull, Yorkshire.
Swallow	United Kingdom	The ship departed from the River Wear for Dundee, Forfarshire. No further trace, presumed foundered with the loss of all hands.
Tartar	United Kingdom	The steamship was driven ashore at Rye.

== 25 December ==
List of shipwrecks: 25 December 1862
Ship	State	Description
Augusta	United Kingdom	The barque foundered in the Atlantic Ocean. Her crew were rescued by the barque Garibaldi (Norway). Augusta was on a voyage from New York, United States to Queenstown, County Cork.
Cranston	United Kingdom	The ship was driven ashore and wrecked near "Guimerans", Brazil. Her crew survived. Shew as on a voyage from Maranhão, Brazil to Liverpool, Lancashire.
Flotta	United Kingdom	The barque was driven ashore near Libava, Courland Governorate. She was on a voyage from Whitby, Yorkshire to Liepāja.
Malvina	United Kingdom	The ship was driven ashore at Croyde, Devon. Her crew were rescued. She was on a voyage from Plymouth, Devon to Cardiff, Glamorgan.
Providence	United Kingdom	The ship was holed by her anchor in the River Deben and was beached. She subsequently capsized She was on a voyage from Orford, Suffolk to Wakefield, Yorkshire.

== 26 December ==
List of shipwrecks: 26 December 1862
Ship	State	Description
Anne	United Kingdom	The sloop was abandoned in the North Sea with the loss of a crew member. Survivors were rescued by the schooner Plough Boy (United Kingdom). Anne was on a voyage from Seaham, County Durham to Maidstone, Kent.
Brazil	United Kingdom	The barque ran aground on Salter's Bank, in Liverpool Bay. Her thirteen crew were rescued by the Lytham Lifeboat. She was on a voyage from Bangor, Maine, United States to Liverpool, Lancashire.
Marshal	United Kingdom	The schooner ran aground at Caernarfon. She was on a voyage from Bangor, Caernarfonshire to Shoreham-by-Sea, Sussex. She was refloated and put in to Pwllheli, Caernarfonshire in a leaky condition.
Robert	United Kingdom	The Yorkshire Billyboy capsized 3 nautical miles (5.6 km) off Flamborough Head, East Riding of Yorkshire. Her crew took to a boat; they were rescued by the schooner Volunteer (United Kingdom). Robert was on a voyage from Wisbech, Cambridgeshire to Newcastle upon Tyne, Northumberland.
Robert Airey	United Kingdom	The tug struck the pier and was driven ashore at Whitby, Yorkshire. She was refloated and taken in to Whitby.
Tramp	United Kingdom	The schooner was driven ashore at Visby, Sweden. She was declared a constructive total loss.

== 27 December ==
List of shipwrecks: 27 December 1862
Ship	State	Description
Bromleys	United Kingdom	The brig was abandoned off the mouth of the Elbe. Her crew were rescued by Eugenie (United Kingdom) Bromleys was on a voyage from Hamburg to Newcastle upon Tyne, Northumberland.
Brothers	United Kingdom	The ship ran aground off Ouddorp, South Holland, Netherlands with the loss of two of her crew. She was on a voyage from Broadstairs, Kent to West Hartlepool, County Durham.
Calypso	United Kingdom	The ship was wrecked in the Gaspar Strait.
Home	United Kingdom	The ship ran aground in Broadhaven Bay. She was on a voyage from Montreal, Province of Canada, British North America to the Clyde. she was refloated.
Isis	United Kingdom	The barque was wrecked on Grand Bahama, Bahamas. She was on a voyage from Manzanillo, Cuba to Falmouth, Cornwall.
Jason	United Kingdom	The steamship was driven ashore and wrecked 3 nautical miles (5.6 km) north of Madras, India. All on board were rescued by another steamship.
Key West	Confederate States of America	American Civil War: The 169-ton sternwheel paddle steamer was burned on the Arkansas River at Van Buren, Arkansas, across from Strain's Landing after her capture by Union forces.
Lorina	United Kingdom	The schooner ran aground on the wreck of Gutenburg (Flag unknown). She was refloated with assistance from the steamship Tay (United Kingdom).
Liberty	United States	American Civil War: The 261-ton sternwheel paddle steamer struck a snag and sank at Twelve Pole Creek below Huntington, Virginia, Confederate States of America.
Pioneer	United Kingdom	The barque was driven ashore and wrecked at Plymouth, Devon.
Robert	United Kingdom	The ship foundered in the North Sea off Bridlington, Yorkshire. Her crew were rescued. She was on a voyage from Wisbech, Cambridgeshire to Newcastle upon Tyne, Northumberland.
Sonder Jylland	Denmark	The schooner was beached at Copenhagen. She was on a voyage from Dundee, Forfarshire, United Kingdom to Copenhagen.
Sovereign	Flag unknown	The schooner parted her moorings and sank at Navarro, California, United States.
The Cedars	United Kingdom	The barque was damaged by fire at Sunderland, County Durham.
Violet	Confederate States of America	American Civil War: The 89-ton sternwheel paddle steamer was burned on the Arkansas River at Van Buren, Arkansas.
Warner	Kingdom of Hanover	The galiot was driven ashore at "Lildstrand", Denmark. Her crew were rescued. She was on a voyage from Christiania, Norway to London, United Kingdom.
Wilhelm	Kingdom of Hanover	The galiot was driven ashore on Eierland, North Holland, Netherlands. She was on a voyage from London to Bremerhaven. She was refloated on 31 December and taken in to "Koekssloot".
William	Prussia	The brig was driven ashore at "Iversted", Denmark with the loss of all but three of her crew. She was on a voyage from Cardiff, Glamorgan, United Kingdom to Copenhagen, Denmark.

== 28 December ==
List of shipwrecks: 28 December 1862
Ship	State	Description
Alida	Netherlands	The ship was wrecked on Düne, Heligoland. Her crew were rescued. She was on a voyage from Gothenburg, Sweden to London, United Kingdom.
Arkansas	Confederate States of America	American Civil War: The 115-ton sidewheel paddle steamer was burned in the Arkansas River above Lee's Creek Bluff in Arkansas to prevent her capture by Union forces.
Bertha	Stralsund	The ship was wrecked on the Swedish coast. Her crew were rescued. Shew ason a voyage from Sunderland, County Durham, United Kingdom to Kiel, Prussia.
Blue Wing No. 2	United States	American Civil War: The 170-ton sidewheel paddle steamer was shelled by Confederate artillery and captured by Confederate forces on the Mississippi River eight miles (13 km) below Napoleon, Arkansas, then was towed away and burned.
Era No. 6	Confederate States of America	American Civil War: The 83-ton sternwheel paddle steamer was burned on the Arkansas River one mile (1.6 km) above Van Buren, Arkansas, to prevent her capture by Union forces.

== 29 December ==
List of shipwrecks: 29 December 1862
Ship	State	Description
Black Prince	United Kingdom	The ship ran aground at Woosung, China.
Bois Rouge	France	The full-rigged ship was wrecked in Carmarthen Bay with the loss of six of her 24 crew. she was on a voyage from Nantes, Loire-Inférieure to Cardiff, Glamorgan, United Kingdom.
Catherine	United Kingdom	The ship ran aground on the Foreness Rock, Margate, Kent.
Fanny Harris	United States	The 159-ton sternwheel paddle steamer was sunk by ice at Point Douglas, Minnesota.
Frederick Notrebe	Confederate States of America	American Civil War: Aground on the Arkansas River one mile (1.6 km) below Van Buren, Arkansas, and captured by Union Army raiders on 28 December, the sidewheel paddle steamer was shelled by Confederate artillery and then burned by Union forces to prevent her recapture by the Confederates.
Go Forward	United Kingdom	The ship was abandoned in the Atlantic Ocean. She was on a voyage from Saint Domingo to Liverpool, Lancashire.
Hannah	United Kingdom	The schooner was abandoned off Porthleven, Cornwall. her crew were rescued.
Hellespont	United Kingdom	The ship was driven ashore in the Yangtze Kiang.
James	United Kingdom	The brig was abandoned in the Atlantic Ocean. Her crew were rescued by the brig American Union (United States). James was on a voyage from Prince Edward Island, British North America to Liverpool. She was subsequently boarded by eight crew of American Union and taken in to Liverpool, where she arrived on 16 January 1863.
Jason	United Kingdom	The steamship was wrecked at Ennore, India. All on board were rescued by the steamship Calcutta (United Kingdom). She was on a voyage from London to Madras, India.
Kate Hooper	United States	The medium clipper caught fire in Hobsons Bay, Victoria and was scuttled. Subsequently sold, refloated, repaired and returned to service as the Victorian barque Salamander.
Robert and Betsey	United Kingdom	The ship was driven ashore and damaged at Redcar, Yorkshire. She was on a voyage from King's Lynn, Norfolk to Middlesbrough, Yorkshire. She was refloated and taken in to Hartlepool, County Durham.
Rose Douglas	Confederate States of America	American Civil War: Captured by Union Army raiders on 28 December while carrying a cargo of corn, molasses, and sugar, the 123-ton sternwheel paddle steamer was shelled by Confederate artillery and then burned by Union forces on the Arkansas River at Van Buren, Arkansas, to prevent her recapture by the Confederates.
Speed	United Kingdom	The ship was lost off Java, Netherlands East Indies. She was on a voyage from Batavia, Netherlands East Indies to Siam.

== 30 December ==
List of shipwrecks: 30 December 1862
Ship	State	Description
Ann	Confederate States of America	American Civil War, Union blockade: Carrying a cargo of coffee, salt, and other goods, the 3½-ton sloop was destroyed at Jupiter Inlet on the coast of Florida by the bark USS Gem of the Sea (United States Navy).
Friede	Danzig	The ship ran aground on the Swinebottoms, in the Baltic Sea. She was on a voyage from Sunderland, County Durham, United Kingdom to Swinemünde. She was refloated and taken in to Helsingør, Denmark in a leaky condition.
Venus	United Kingdom	The ship struck floating wreckage 20 nautical miles (37 km) south of the Îles des Saintes, Finistère, France and was holed. She was on a voyage from Rochefort, Charente-Inférieure to Cardiff, Glamorgan. She put in to Brest, Finistère in a leaky condition.

== 31 December ==
List of shipwrecks: 31 December 1862
Ship	State	Description
Caledonia	United States	The steamship was driven ashore at Cape Cod, Massachusetts, United States and broke her back. She was on a voyage from the Clyde to Portland, Maine and New York. She was refloated on 12 October 1863 and taken in to Boston, Massachusetts. Subsequently repaired and returned to service.
Frying Pan Shoals Lightship	Confederate States of America	The lightship was destroyed in the Cape Fear River in North Carolina near Fort Caswell by men aboard a cutter and a gig from the armed screw steamer USS Mount Vernon (United States Navy).
Geebruder	Netherlands	The ship foundered off Ostend, West Flanders, Belgium with the loss of two of her crew. She was on a voyage from Newcastle upon Tyne, Northumberland, United Kingdom to Rotterdam, South Holland.
Hendrick en Jimsje	Netherlands	The galiot was wrecked in the Vliehors. She was on a voyage from Sunderland, County Durham, United Kingdom to Groningen.
USS Monitor	United States Navy	An 1863 engraving of USS Monitor sinking, with USS Rhode Island standing by. American Civil War: The monitor foundered in a heavy storm in the Atlantic Ocean off Cape Hatteras, North Carolina, Confederate States of America with the loss of 16 crew while under tow by the sidewheel paddle steamer USS Rhode Island (United States Navy).
Romance of the Seas	United States	The extreme clipper departed from Hong Kong for San Francisco, California. No further trace, posted missing in April 1863.
Wave	United Kingdom	The schooner was wrecked on the Roan Rocks, on the coast of Aberdeenshire. All on board survived.

== Unknown date ==
List of shipwrecks: Unknown date in December 1862
Ship	State	Description
Abena	United Kingdom	The brig was lost off Sagua la Grande, Cuba before 4 December. She was on a voyage from Greenock, Renfrewshire to Sagua la Grande.
Adonis	United Kingdom	The ship was lost near "Big Bras d'Or". She was on a voyage from Montreal, Province of Quebec to Halifax, Nova Scotia, British North America.
Anna Maria	Norway	The ship was abandoned in the North Sea. Her crew were rescued. She was on a voyage from the River Wear to Kristiansand.
Annette Hage	Flag unknown	The ship sank in the Kattegat.
B. M. Runyon	United States Army	The 443-ton sidewheel transport sank in shallow water in the Mississippi River below Alton, Illinois. She was refloated, repaired, and returned to service.
Britannia	United Kingdom	The ship was wrecked on the Newcombe Sand, in the North Sea off the coast of Suffolk. She was on a voyage from Hartlepool, County Durham to Boulogne, Pas-de-Calais, France.
Catherine Elizabeth	United Kingdom	The ship was abandoned in the Atlantic Ocean. Her crew were rescued by Crimea (United Kingdom). Catherine Elizabeth Barron was on a voyage from Saint Kitts to London.
Cohota	United States	The ship was lost in the South China Sea. She was on a voyage from Saigon, French Cochinchina to New York.
C. W. Gunnel, or G. W. Gunnel	Flag unknown	The schooner was stranded at Point Arena, California, United States.
Doctor Buffington	United States	The 262-ton sidewheel paddle steamer foundered in the White River in Arkansas, Confederate States of America.
Dorothy	United Kingdom	The ship was driven ashore at Blakeney, Norfolk. She was refloated and taken in to Blakeney.
Dunbarton	United Kingdom	The ship foundered off the coast of Newfoundland, British North America before 9 December.
Elizabeth	United Kingdom	The barque ran aground on the Longsand. She was refloated.
Elizabeth Leavitt	United Kingdom	The ship foundered off the south coast of Spain. Her crew were rescued. She was on a voyage from Cádiz, Spain to Messina, Sicily, Italy.
Fallentore	United Kingdom	The brig was abandoned in the Atlantic Ocean. She was on a voyage from Demerara, British Guiana to London.
Gertrude	United Kingdom	The ship foundered off Ostend, West Flanders, Belgium with the loss of 32 of her crew. She was on a voyage from Newcastle upon Tyne, Northumberland to Rotterdam, South Holland, Netherlands.
Golden Crown	United Kingdom	The steamship departed from the River Tyne for London in mid-December. No further trace, presumed foundered with the loss of all hands.
Helena	United Kingdom	The ship was driven ashore on Hirsholmene, Denmark.
Hilda Charlotte	United Kingdom	The ship was wrecked at Woosung, China.
H. T. Clay	Flag unknown	The schooner was stranded on the Noyo River in California.
Ida	Norway	The ship ran aground at Cromarty, United Kingdom between 18 and 20 December and was damaged. She was on a voyage from Hartlepool to Fredrikstad. She arrived at Inverness, United Kingdom on 30 December for repairs.
Independence	United States	The ship was lost in the South China Sea. She was on a voyage from Manila, Spanish East Indies to New York.
James Watt	United Kingdom	The ship was lost off Yevpatoria, Russia. She was on a voyage from Odesa to a British port
Jason	United Kingdom	The schooner ran aground on the Longsand. She was on a voyage from Whitby, Yorkshire to Arundel, Sussex. She was refloated with assistance from Ranger and Volunteer (both United Kingdom).
J. E. Murcock	Flag unknown	The schooner was stranded on the Noyo River.
Kate	United Kingdom	The ship foundered off the coast of Lincolnshire. Her crew were rescued by the smack Alert (United Kingdom). Kate was on a voyage from Sunderland, County Durham to Aldeburgh, Suffolk.
Marianne	Portugal	The brig foundered off Bergen Norway before 15 December. Five crew were rescued by Emma Elizabeth (France). Marianne was on a voyage from Rio de Janeiro, Brazil to Copenhagen, Denmark.
Mercur	Danzig	The ship foundered in the North Sea 40 nautical miles (74 km) off "Jaderland". Her crew were rescued. She was on a voyage from Liverpool, Lancashire, United Kingdom to Danzig.
Montagu	United Kingdom	The steamship was driven ashore at Port Glasgow, Renfrewshire. She was refloated on 22 December and taken in to Glasgow.
Najaden	Sweden	The ship was wrecked near Utlängan. Her crew were rescued. She was on a voyage from Sundsvall to Bristol, Gloucestershire, United Kingdom.
Phillippus Cornelius	Netherlands	The ship was driven ashore at Albardão, Brazil. She was on a voyage from Montevideo, Uruguay to Paranaguá, Brazil. She was condemned.
Princess Victoria	United Kingdom	The ship was driven ashore at Eagle Point. She was on a voyage from Hartlepool, County Durham to Lymington, Hampshire. She was refloated and taken in to Cowes, Isle of Wight in a leaky condition.
Reliance	United States	The 156-ton sternwheel paddle steamer struck and snag and sank in the Ohio River near Steubenville, Ohio.
Samuel Barrington	United Kingdom	The barque was wrecked at Lawn, Newfoundland. She was on a voyage from Montreal to Liverpool.
Solfia	Sweden	The ship was wrecked at Westergarn, Gotland. She was on a voyage from Sundsvall to London.
Spartan	United Kingdom	The brig was beached at Ely's Harbour, Bermuda about a week before 27 December. She was on a voyage from New York to Queenstown, County Cork.
Tallentire	United Kingdom	The ship was abandoned in the Atlantic Ocean. She was on a voyage from Demerara, British Honduras to London.
William Walker	United Kingdom	The ship sank at Leith, Lothian. She was refloated in mid-January 1863 and found to be a constructive total loss.
