= Battle of New Bern order of battle =

Orders of battle of the Union and Confederate forces at the Battle of New Bern, 14 March 1862.

== Military Rank Abbreviations Used ==
- BG = Brigadier General
- Col = Colonel
- Ltc = Lieutenant Colonel
- Maj = Major
- Cpt = Captain
- Lt = Lieutenant

== Union Army ==
=== Department of North Carolina "Coast Division of the US Army" ===
BG Ambrose E. Burnside

| Brigades | Regiments and batteries |
|---|---|
| First Brigade: BG John G. Foster | 10th Connecticut: Ltc Albert Drake; 23rd Massachusetts: Col John Kurtz; 24th Massachusetts: Col Thomas G. Stevenson; 25th Massachusetts: Col Edwin Upton; 27th Massachusetts: Col Horace C. Lee |
| Second Brigade BG Jesse L. Reno | 21st Massachusetts: Ltc William S. Clark; 9th New Jersey Volunteer Infantry (Jersey Muskrats): Ltc Charles Heckman; 51st New York: Col Edward Ferrero; 51st Pennsylvania: Col John Hartranft |
| Third Brigade BG John G. Parke | 8th Connecticut: Col Edward Harland; 11th Connecticut: Ltc Charles Mathewson; 4th Rhode Island: Col Isaac P. Rodman; 5th Rhode Island |
| Unassigned units | 1st New York Marine Artillery (detachment): Col William A. Howard; 99th New York (Union Coast Guard) (Company B): Ltc Charles W. Tillotson; New York Rocket Battalion; Army gunboat Picket |

=== Union Navy ===
| US Naval Forces in Pamlico Sound; Commander Stephen C. Rowan | Philadelphia; Stars and Stripes; Louisiana; Hetzel; Underwriter; Delaware; Commodore Perry; Valley City; Commodore Barney; Hunchback; Southfield; Morse; John L. Lockwood; Henry Brinker |

== Confederate Army ==
| | Regiments and batteries |
|---|---|
| Pamlico District of the Department of North Carolina; BG Lawrence O'Bryan Branch | 2nd North Carolina Cavalry; 7th North Carolina; 26th North Carolina; 27th North Carolina; 28th North Carolina; 33rd North Carolina: Col. Clark M. Avery; 35th North Carolina; 37th North Carolina; North Carolina Heavy Artillery (company); Special Battalion, North Carolina Militia |
