= Atlantic Blockading Squadron =

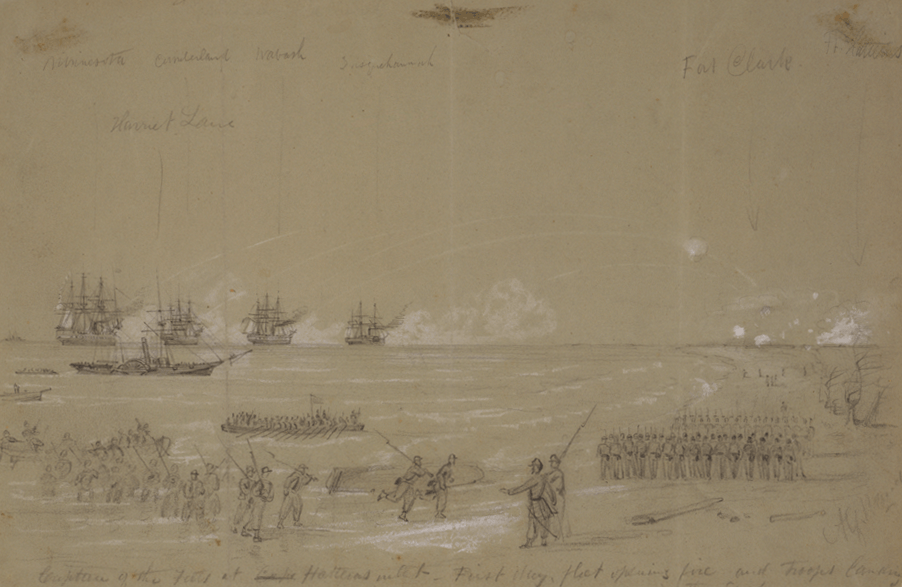
- Capture of the Forts at Cape Hatteras Inlet by Alfred R. Waud, artist, August 28, 1861.
- Active: 1861
- Country: United States
- Branch: United States Navy
- Type: naval squadron

The Atlantic Blockading Squadron was a unit of the United States Navy created in the early days of the American Civil War to enforce the Union blockade of the ports of the Confederate States. It was formed in 1861 and split up the same year for the creation of the North Atlantic Blockading Squadron and the South Atlantic Blockading Squadron.

== History ==
=== American Civil War ===
Following President Abraham Lincoln’s proclamation of a blockade of Southern ports on April 19, 1861, the Navy Department found it necessary to subdivide the territory assigned to the Home Squadron. This resulted in the creation of the Coast Blockading Squadron and the Gulf Blockading Squadron in early May 1861.

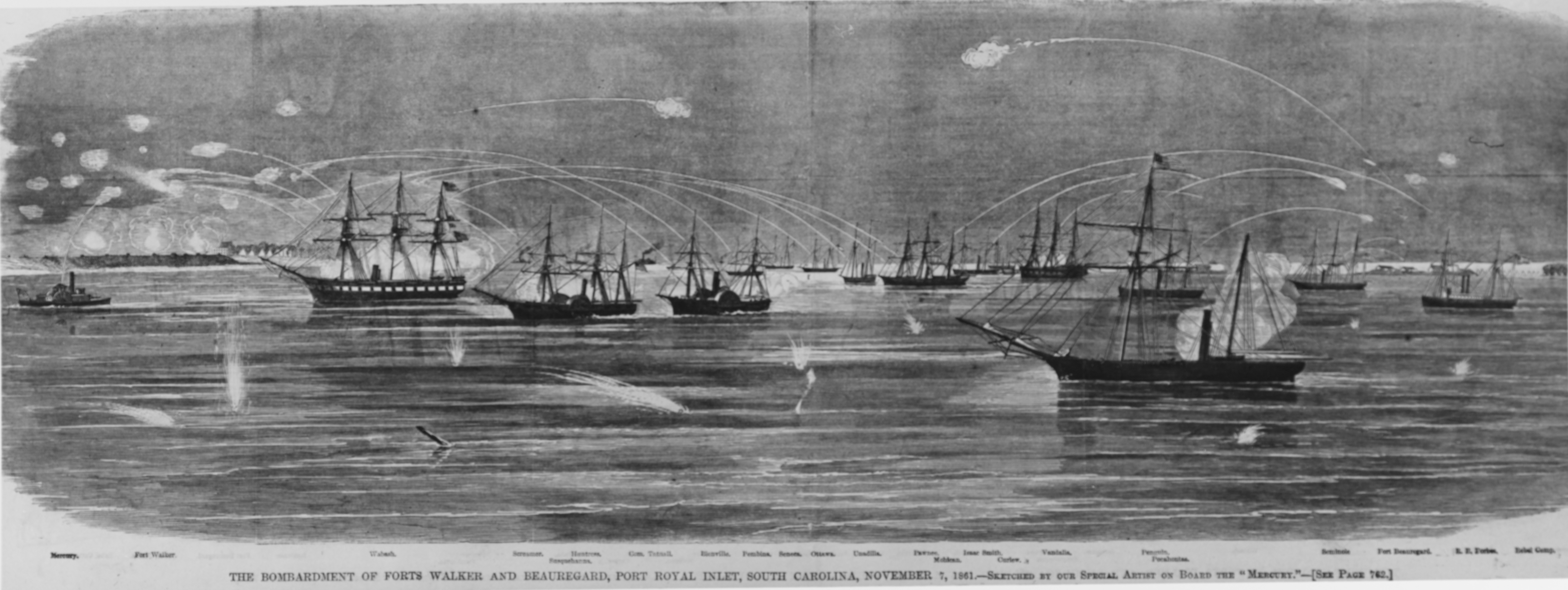
Warships of the Atlantic Blockading Squadron bombarding Port Royal, South Carolina, in November 1861.

In orders sent on May 1, 1861 Secretary of the Navy Gideon Welles appointed Flag Officer Silas H. Stringham to command the Coast Blockading Squadron. Stringham received this order and took command on May 4, 1861. His new command was to be headquartered at Hampton Roads, Virginia, and was given responsibility for the blockading of the coast from the capes of the Chesapeake to the southern extremity of Florida and Key West. On May 17, 1861, the Coast Blockading Squadron was re-designated the Atlantic Blockading Squadron.

On September 16, 1861, Stringham tendered his resignation as commander of the squadron following his receipt of a letter from Acting Secretary of the Navy Gustavus V. Fox that he felt indicated disapproval of his measures to enforce the blockade. Stringham’s resignation was accepted on September 18, 1861, and the same day Flag Officer Louis M. Goldsborough was appointed as his replacement. The transfer of command took place on September 23, 1861, when Goldsborough arrived at Hampton Roads. In communicating to Goldsborough about his appointment Gideon Welles stated that “more vigorous and energetic action must be taken” to enforce the blockade.

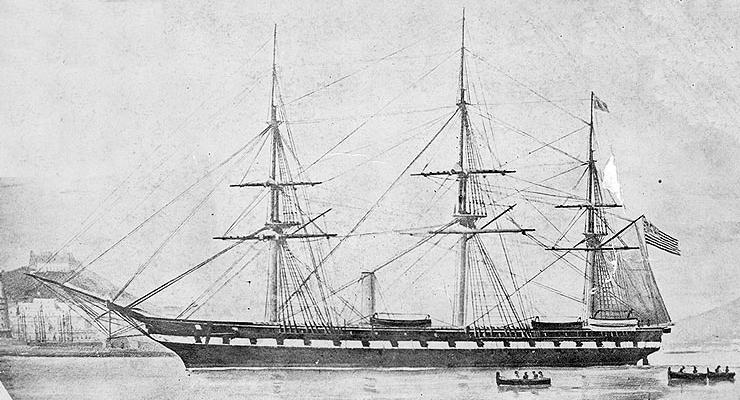
The frigate USS Roanoke.

During the summer of 1861 a four-person board, chaired by Captain Samuel F. Du Pont, was formed to study the implementation of the blockade and make recommendations to improve its efficiency. In the board’s report of July 16, 1861, it was recommended that the Atlantic region be divided into northern and southern sectors. On September 18, 1861, the Navy Department reached the decision to implement this division with the dividing line being the border between North Carolina and South Carolina. The implementation of this was delayed for a time and on October 12, 1861, the Navy Department informed Flag Officer Goldsborough that the division of his command would be effective as of the date Flag Officer Samuel F. Du Pont, who was appointed commander of the southern squadron, departed from Hampton Roads with the expedition to capture Port Royal, South Carolina. Du Pont departed on October 29, 1861, upon which date the squadron was divided to form the North Atlantic Blockading Squadron and the South Atlantic Blockading Squadron.

The only major operation conducted by the Atlantic Blockading Squadron was the expedition that led to the capture of Hatteras Inlet, North Carolina August 26–29, 1861. This goal of the operation was to deny use of the inlet to Confederate shipping and this was accomplished with few casualties. The operation was also significant for giving the Union a badly needed victory following the Battle of Bull Run, being the first amphibious landing and the first large scale combined Army-Navy operation of the war.

== Ships of the Squadron ==
On May 17, 1861, there were only fourteen ships assigned to the squadron, along with the Flying Flotilla (later the Potomac Flotilla) which was being formed by Commander James H. Ward who had departed for the Chesapeake from the New York Navy Yard on May 16, 1861. In effect Ward's flotilla acted independently under the direct orders of the Navy Department, though there was some transfer of vessels between the commands. With the acquisition and arming of civilian vessels the Atlantic Blockading Squadron grew to about three times its original allocated strength.

Ship	Rate	Type	Notes
Minnesota	1st	Screw Frigate	Squadron Flagship
Roanoke	1st	Screw Frigate	
Wabash	1st	Screw Frigate	
Susquehanna	1st	Sidewheel Frigate	
Brandywine	2nd	Sailing Frigate	Storeship, Hampton Roads
Congress	2nd	Sailing Frigate	
Cumberland	2nd	Sailing Frigate	
St. Lawrence	2nd	Sailing Frigate	
Sabine	2nd	Sailing Frigate	
Savannah	2nd	Sailing Frigate	
Pawnee	2nd	Screw Sloop	
Iroquois	3rd	Screw Sloop	
Seminole	3rd	Screw Sloop	
Dale	4th	Sailing Sloop	
Jamestown	3rd	Sailing Sloop	
Vandalia	4th	Sailing Sloop	
Quaker City	2nd	Sidewheel Gunboat	
Cambridge	3rd	Screw Gunboat	
Flag	3rd	Screw Gunboat	
Harriet Lane	3rd	Sidewheel Gunboat	from United States Revenue Cutter Service
Albatross	4th	Screw Gunboat	
Dawn	4th	Screw Gunboat	
Daylight	4th	Screw Gunboat	
Louisiana	4th	Screw Gunboat	
Monticello	4th	Screw Gunboat	
Mount Vernon	4th	Screw Gunboat	
Penguin	4th	Screw Gunboat	
Pocahontas	4th	Screw Gunboat	
R. B. Forbes	4th	Screw Gunboat	
Stars and Stripes	4th	Screw Gunboat	
Valley City	4th	Screw Gunboat	
Ceres	4th	Sidewheel Gunboat	
John L. Lockwood	4th	Sidewheel Gunboat	
Thomas Freeborn	4th	Sidewheel Gunboat	
Underwriter	4th	Sidewheel Gunboat	
Union	4th	Screw Auxiliary	
Young Rover	4th	Screw Auxiliary	
Adelaide	4th	Sidewheel Auxiliary	Transport
Cohasset	4th	Screw Tug	
Reliance	4th	Screw Tug	
Rescue	4th	Screw Tug	
Resolute	4th	Screw Tug	
Young America	4th	Screw Tug	ex-Confederate captured by USS Cumberland 24 Apr 1861 in Hampton Roads
General Putnam	4th	Sidewheel Tug	Also known as USS William G. Putnam
Yankee	4th	Sidewheel Tug	
Ben Morgan	4th	Sailing Ship	Hospital Ship
Charles Phelps	4th	Sailing Ship	Coal Ship
Perry	4th	Sailing Brig	
Gemsbok	4th	Sailing Bark	
Release	4th	Sailing Bark	Storeship

== Commanders ==
Squadron Commander	From	To
Flag Officer Silas Horton Stringham	4 May 1861	23 Sep 1861
Flag Officer Louis Malesherbes Goldsborough	23 Sep 1861	29 Oct 1861
