= USS Stars and Stripes =

Gunboat of the United States Navy

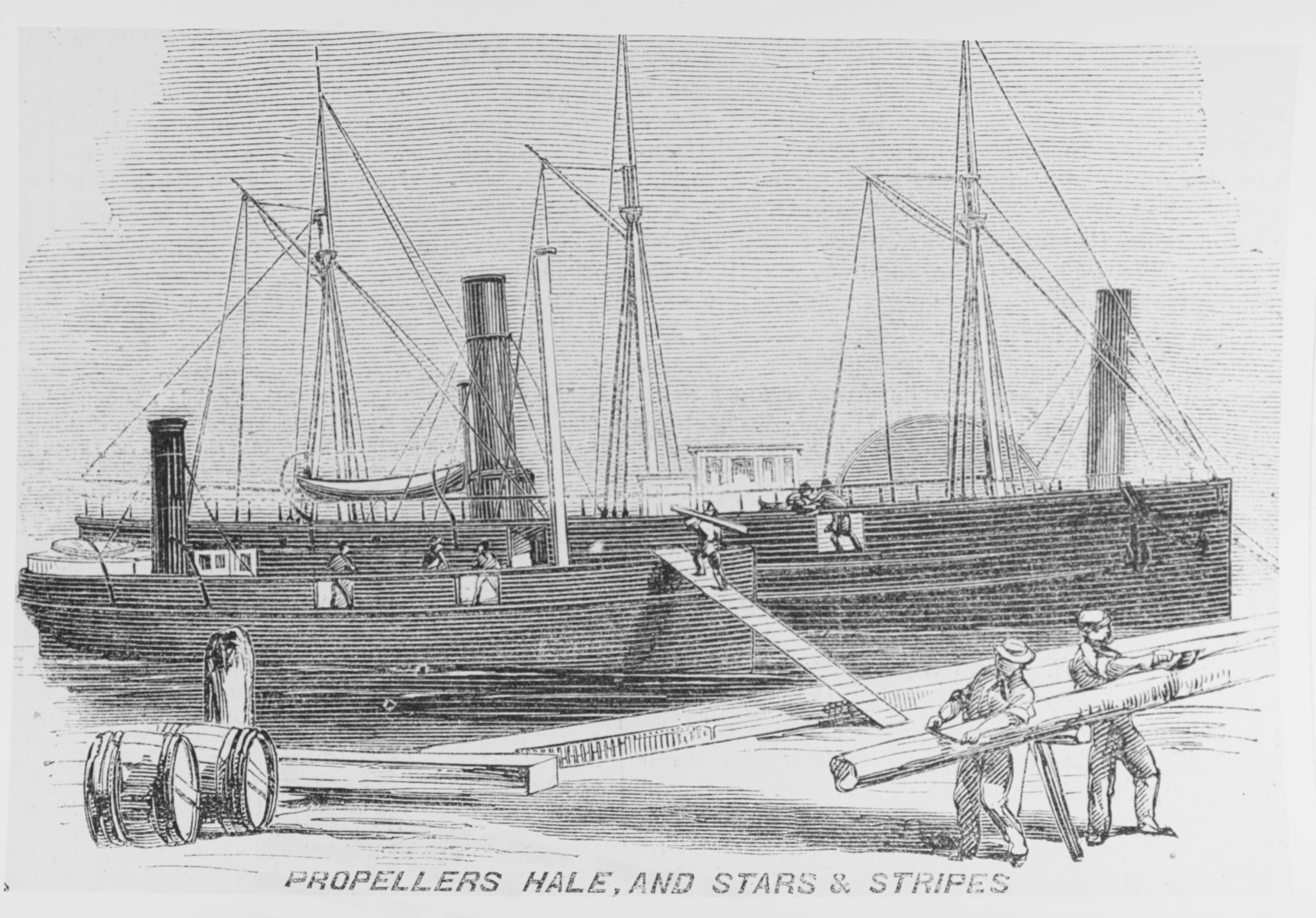
- The steamers E.B. Hale and Stars & Stripes fitting out at the New York Navy Yard, during the summer of 1861

History

United States
- Acquired: 27 July 1861
- Commissioned: 19 September 1861
- Decommissioned: 30 June 1865
- Fate: Sold, 10 August 1865; Sunk, 31 January 1878

General characteristics
- Tonnage: 407 tons
- Length: 124 ft 3 in (37.87 m)
- Beam: 34 ft 6 in (10.52 m)
- Depth of hold: 16 ft 4 in (4.98 m)
- Propulsion: steam engine; screw-propelled
- Speed: 10.5 knots (19.4 km/h; 12.1 mph)
- Complement: 94 crew, including officers
- Armament: four 8-inch 55 cwt cannon; one 20-pounder Parrott rifle

USS Stars and Stripes was a 407-ton steamer acquired by the U.S. Navy and put to use by the Union during the American Civil War.

Stars and Stripes served the Union Navy primarily as a screw gunboat, and as a tugboat when necessary, in the blockade of the rivers and ports of the Confederate States of America.

== Service history ==
=== Civil War operations ===
Stars and Stripes—a screw steamer built at Mystic, Connecticut, by Charles Mallory as a speculation for C. S. Bushnell—was purchased by the Navy at New York City from C. S. Bushnell on 27 July 1861; was fitted out for naval service at the New York Navy Yard and was commissioned there on 19 September 1861, Lt. Reed Werden in command.

Assigned to the Atlantic Blockading Squadron, Stars and Stripes reached Hampton Roads, Virginia, on 26 September. Two days later, she was ordered to tow schooners of the Stone Fleet to Hatteras Inlet, North Carolina. She arrived off Hatteras Inlet on 1 October and operated in that vicinity for the next few months. While there, the Ceres, General Putnam, and Underwriter were subordinate to the orders of her captain. Because of the draft of the Stars and Stripes and the Underwriter, Lt. Werden was unwilling to have them enter Pamlico Sound due to shallowness of Hatteras Inlet. On 2 November, a Confederate vessel engaged the Stars and Stripes at long range briefly before retiring. The exchange was ineffectual since neither ship came within range of the other's guns. On 5 and 6 November, the ships under Lt. Werden's command attempted to provide assistance to the French corvette Prony which had run aground, but between concern for the weather and Rebel activity, proved unable to do so. On 15 December, she captured schooner Charity and sent her to New York City for adjudication.

On 7 February 1862, the screw gunboat was in the squadron which attacked Roanoke Island and the next day captured that base which controlled communication between Pamlico Sound and Albemarle Sound. On 20 February while transferring ammunition to the Isaac N. Seymour, that ship struck the submerged anchor of the Louisiana and was sunk, with most of her crew brought aboard the Stars and Stripes. She operated in the inland waters of North Carolina and helped capture New Bern, North Carolina, in mid-March. Stars and Stripes returned to Norfolk, Virginia, on 4 June for repairs and sailed on the evening of the 10th for blockading duty off Wilmington, North Carolina. Shortly before dawn on the 27th, she helped USS Cambridge destroy blockade-running steamer Modem Greece which that Union blockader had run aground. On 24 August, Stars and Stripes captured British ship Mary Elizabeth attempting to slip into Wilmington with a cargo of salt and fruit.

The wear and tear of hard duty forced Stars and Stripes to sail, via Norfolk, Virginia, to Philadelphia, Pennsylvania, for repairs. She was decommissioned at the Norfolk Navy Yard on 14 September. Quickly restored to a serviceable condition, the ship was recommissioned on 29 September and was assigned to the East Gulf Blockading Squadron. The steamer reached Key West, Florida, and spent the remainder of the Civil War operating off the gulf coast of Florida. Highlights of her service in 1863 included capturing sloop Florida at St. Marks Bay, Florida, laden with cotton and tar on 3 June; the expedition of boat crews from the steamer and USS Somerset to Marsh Island, Florida, to destroy salt and salt works on 15 July; and the destruction under heavy fire of blockade-running schooner Caroline Gertrude aground on the bar at the mouth of the Ochlockonee River on 29 December. In 1864, she captured blockade-running steamer Laura off the Ochlockonee on 18 January; she destroyed an extensive Confederate fishery at Marsh Island on 19 and 20 October and captured the troops stationed there as guards; and she joined three other gunboats in an expedition on 3 December which destroyed extensive salt works at Rocky Point in Tampa Bay. After the end of the Civil War, Stars and Stripes sailed north and was decommissioned at Philadelphia on 30 June 1865. She was sold at public auction there on 10 August 1865 to Thomas Watson and Sons of New York City.

=== Later career ===
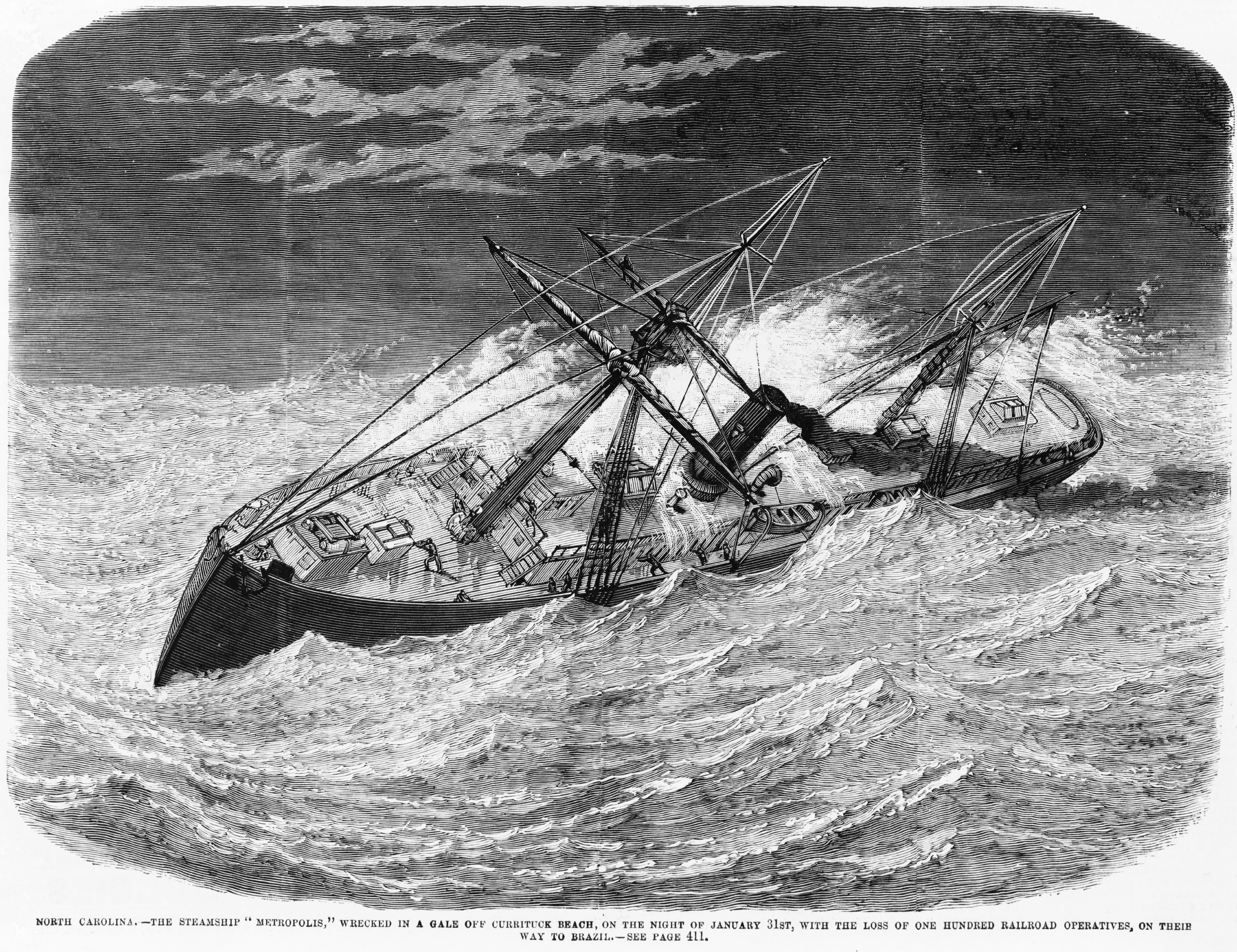
The Metropolis, wrecked in a gale off Currituck Beach, on the night of January 31, 1878 with the loss of one hundred railroad operatives, on their way to Brazil

Stars and Stripes was redocumented on 18 September 1865 as Metropolis. The ship operated in merchant service until, while steaming from Philadelphia to Pará, Brazil, she was wrecked on the outer bar of Currituck Beach, North Carolina, on the evening of 31 January 1878. Both the ship and her cargo were a total loss. 85 persons lost their lives.
