= USS Shawsheen =

Steam operated tugboat purchased by the US Navy

History

United States
- Ordered: as Young America
- Launched: 1855 in New York City
- Acquired: 21 September 1861 at New York City
- Commissioned: 1861 (est.)
- Home port: Newport News, Virginia
- Fate: Captured & burned by Confederate forces, 7 May 1864

General characteristics
- Displacement: 180 tons
- Length: 118 ft (36 m)
- Beam: 22 ft 6 in (6.86 m)
- Draft: 7 ft 3 in (2.21 m)
- Propulsion: Steam engine; Side-paddlewheel
- Speed: not known
- Complement: 40
- Armament: 2 × 20-pounder Parrott rifles

USS Shawsheen was a steam operated tugboat acquired by the Union Navy during the American Civil War.

In addition to her tugboat duties, she was used by the Navy as a gunboat to patrol and blockade navigable waterways of the Confederacy to prevent the South from trading with other countries.

== Built in New York City in 1855 ==
Shawsheen—a side wheel tug built at New York City in 1855—was purchased by the Union Navy at New York City as Young America on 21 September 1861. No record of her commissioning has been found, but Acting Lieutenant Edmund R. Colhoun was apparently the tug's first commanding officer.

== Civil War service ==
=== Assigned to the South Atlantic Blockade ===
Originally assigned to the South Atlantic Blockading Squadron, Shawsheen arrived in Hampton Roads early in November badly damaged and unable to proceed further south under her own power. Nevertheless, the need for blockading vessels was so great off the coast of South Carolina that, on the 12th, she and USS Whitehall—towed by USS Connecticut—got underway to join Flag Officer DuPont. However, their conditions worsened soon after their departure, forcing them both to return to Newport News, Virginia.

=== Shawsheen duels with CSS Patrick Henry ===
Although it seemed desirable to send Shawsheen north for repairs, the tactical situation in the vicinity of Hampton Roads required her to remain there. On the 14th, she ascended the York River to investigate a report that Southern forces were gathering in preparation for an attack. After finding no evidence to support the report, she returned to Newport News and remained there to help guard USS Congress and USS Cumberland.

On 23 November shortly after midnight, Shawsheen and USS John L. Lockwood bombarded a Confederate camp above Newport News on the Yorktown Road. On the morning of 2 December, Confederate steamer, Patrick Henry, attacked the Union warships. Shawsheen engaged the Southern ship for over an hour and claimed to have scored two hits. In any case, the Patrick Henry was damaged and retired toward Norfolk, Virginia.

=== Bombarding and capturing Roanoke Island ===
On 2 January 1862, Shawsheen was ordered to Hatteras Inlet, North Carolina, where a task force was assembling to attempt to capture Roanoke Island, the key to Albemarle Sound.

On 5 February, the ships sortied from Hatteras Inlet and began a bombardment of Roanoke Island on the morning of the 7th. By the end of the next day, the conquest of the island was complete providing the Union Navy with a base which proved invaluable throughout the remainder of the war.

=== North Carolina operations ===
On the 10th, Shawsheen was part of the Union naval force which engaged Southern batteries and a Confederate naval force near Elizabeth City, North Carolina. The Union ships destroyed the fort and batteries, captured CSS Ellis, sank CSS Seabird, and forced the burning of three other Southern ships to keep them from falling into Union hands.

Shawsheen remained in the North Carolina sounds for over a year and one-half, helping to keep those waters under Union control. On 18 May 1862, she and USS Hunchback captured the schooner G. H. Smoot, in Potecase Creek, North Carolina.

On 9 July, she joined USS Commodore Perry and USS Ceres in an expedition up the Roanoke River to Hamilton, North Carolina. Despite small arms fire from the banks, they proceeded upstream to land their troops at Hamilton where steamer, Wilson, was captured.

On 12 December, Shawsheen and three other Union ships began an expedition up the Nuese River to support a Union Army thrust up that stream to destroy railroad bridges and track near Goldsboro, North Carolina, but low water prevented their getting more than 15 miles up stream and they returned four days later.

=== Beating off a surprise attack on Fort Anderson ===
On the night of 13 and 14 March 1863, Shawsheen, with Hunchback, Hetzel, and Ceres, beat off a surprise attack on Fort Anderson on the Nuese River. On 26 May, Shawsheen joined Ceres and USS Henry Brinker in an expedition up the Nuese during which they captured a number of small schooners and boats. They then covered the landing of Union troops and remained on station until the Army was solidly entrenched.

On 22 June, during a reconnaissance in Bay River, Shawsheen captured schooner, Henry Clay, up Spring Creek. She then sent an armed boat up Dimbargon Creek to capture a small unnamed schooner carrying turpentine.

Perhaps her most productive day came on 20 July when she took five schooners—Sally, Helen Jane, Elizabeth, Dolphin and James Brice—near Cedar Island, in the Nuese River. Nine days later, she captured the schooner, Telegraph, in Rose Bay, North Carolina.

=== Overhauled at Hampton Roads ===
But wear and tear was beginning to catch up with the tug. On 3 September, she was ordered to Hampton Roads; and she subsequently was given a thorough overhaul at the Norfolk Navy Yard and at Baltimore, Maryland. When she was ready for service again, the tug was based at Newport News from which she operated on the James and York rivers and their tributaries supporting ground operations.

On 1 May 1864, she and USS General Putnam operated in the Pamunkey River protecting Union troops who had earlier in the day occupied West Point, Virginia. She later returned to Hampton Roads.

On the 6th, with Rear Admiral S. P. Lee embarked, she ascended the James River. Near James Neck, he shifted his flag to USS Malvern. The next day, 7 May 1864, the tug was ordered to drag the river above Chaffin's Bluff.

=== Capture and burning ===
Shortly before noon, while the ship was anchored close to the shore near Turkey Bend, Confederate infantry and artillery surprised and thoroughly disabled the ship. Her commanding officer reluctantly hauled down her colors. Her crew was taken ashore in boats, and Shawsheen was set afire and exploded.
