= USS Cohasset (1860) =

Gunboat of the United States Navy

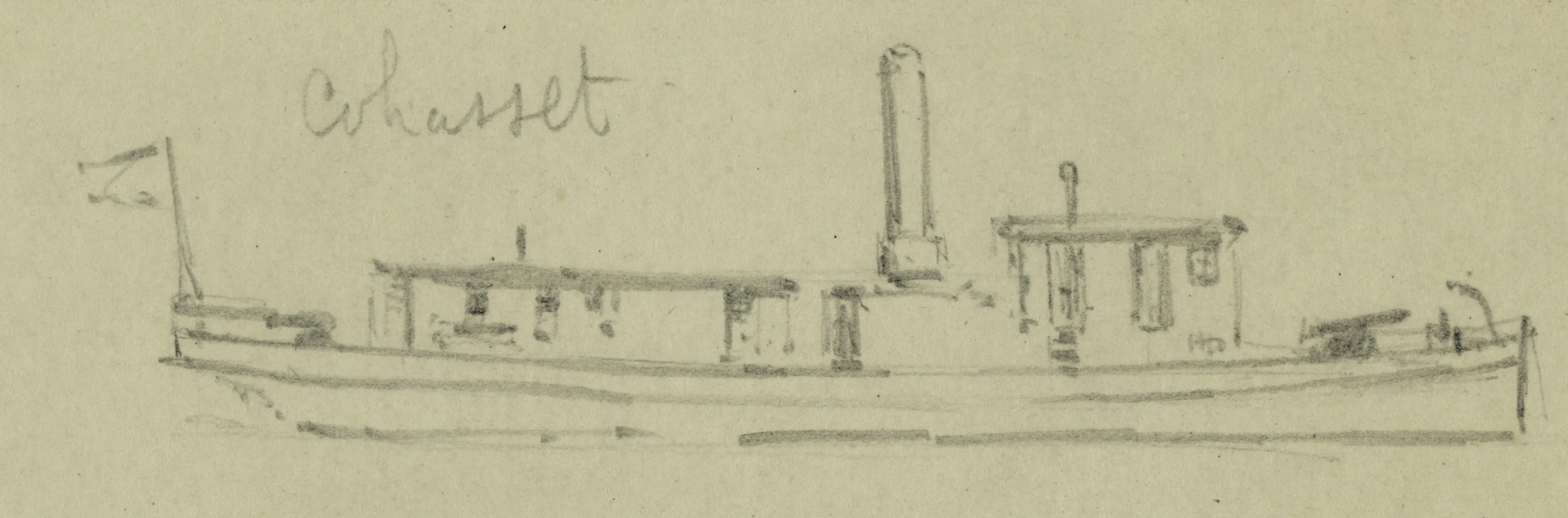
- Sketch of USS Cohasset.

History

United States
- Name: USS Cohasset
- Laid down: date unknown
- Launched: 1860
- Acquired: 13 September 1861
- In service: 26 October 1861
- Out of service: 1882
- Stricken: 1892 (est.)
- Home port: Boston Navy Yard
- Fate: Sold, 9 May 1892

General characteristics
- Type: Tugboat
- Displacement: 100 long tons (100 t)
- Length: 82 ft (25 m)
- Beam: 18 ft 10 in (5.74 m)
- Draft: 7 ft 2 in (2.18 m)
- Propulsion: Steam engine
- Speed: 8 kn (9.2 mph; 15 km/h)
- Complement: 12
- Armament: 1 × 20-pounder rifled gun

USS Cohasset was a tugboat acquired by the Union Navy during the American Civil War. She was used by the Union Navy for various purposes: as a tugboat, dispatch vessel, escort vessel, and even as a gunboat.

Cohasset — a tug originally called E. D. Fogg and later Narragansett — was built in 1860 at Providence, Rhode Island; purchased by the Navy on 13 September 1861; outfitted at New York Navy Yard; delivered at Hampton Roads, Virginia on 26 October 1861; and assigned to duty with the Atlantic Blockading Squadron.

== Assigned to the Atlantic Blockade ==
From 26 October 1861-July 1864, Cohasset sailed in the Norfolk, Virginia, area and in the rivers of Virginia as a picket and dispatch boat, carried mail and supplies, towed coal barges, acted as guard for Minnesota, and shared in the fighting in the York, James, and Nansemond Rivers.

== Providing harbor defense ==
Ordered to Beaufort, North Carolina in July 1864, Cohasset was used for harbor defense and towing until 1 October 1864, when she returned to Norfolk for duty towing coal barges in the James River.

== Post-Civil War activity ==
Cohasset arrived at Boston Navy Yard on 1 June 1865. She served as yard tug there until 1882, when she was transferred to Newport, Rhode Island.

Cohasset was sold on 9 May 1892 at Newport, Rhode Island.
