= USS Henry Brinker =

Gunboat of the United States Navy

History

United States
- Laid down: date unknown
- Launched: 1861
- Acquired: 29 October 1861
- Commissioned: 15 December 1861
- Decommissioned: 29 June 1865
- Stricken: 1865 (est.)
- Fate: Sold, 20 July 1865

General characteristics
- Displacement: 108 tons
- Length: 82 ft (25 m)
- Beam: 26 ft 7 in (8.10 m)
- Draught: depth of hold 6 ft 2 in (1.88 m)
- Propulsion: steam engine; screw-propelled
- Speed: 7 knots
- Complement: not known
- Armament: one 30-pounder cannon

USS Henry Brinker was a small steamship acquired by the Union Navy during the American Civil War. She was placed into service as a gunboat and assigned to the blockade of ports of the Confederate States of America.

== Constructed in Brooklyn, New York, in 1861 ==
Henry Brinker was built in 1861 in Brooklyn, New York, and was purchased at New York City by the Navy 29 October 1861 from her owner, Henry Brinker. Henry Brinker was typical of many of the hundreds of ship owners who sold their small vessels to the Navy in the early days of the war. They were small-time business people who had something the government desperately needed. With Germany in the throes of social and political turmoil Brinker emigrated from Hanover and began selling fruits and vegetables on the streets of New York. In the 1850s he started buying up properties that were needed as rights-of-way by the expanding railway network in the state. These properties were resold to various railroad interests at significant profit. Brinker used the proceeds from the sales to invest in several of the new railroads serving New York and to acquire his ship. His wooden steamer, named after him, was built in Brooklyn in 1861. The vessel was purchased for the Navy at New York City by George D. Morgan on 29 October 1861 for $13,000. (This amount is equal to about $371,000 today) It was hastily converted into a warship at Baltimore by initially adding a 30-pound Parrott gun. For his part in the war effort, in 1855 Mr. Brinker joined the New York State Militia's Third Regiment, First Brigade, First Division. He was popular with the men of this cavalry regiment and was promoted to the rank of second lieutenant in 1857. He was appointed captain during the year of his marriage to Annie Bruns in 1863. He made colonel in 1871 and ultimately rose to the rank of major general in the New York State National Guard. After the war he became the city of Rochester's public health officer and in 1886 he went into a partnership in the Miller Brewing Company. This firm was the first lager brewer in Rochester to make ale. To serve the thriving family trade the Miller brewery was also one of the first to establish its own bottling facility. Brinker died in 1901. USS Brinker arrived Hampton Roads, Virginia, 15 December 1861 and was commissioned that day, Acting Master John E. Giddings commanding. No photographs of the Henry Brinker are known to survive. To remedy this, in 2020 a team of naval historians consulted with maritime artist Patrick O’Brien to create an image of USS Henry Brinker, as it would have appeared as part of the North Atlantic Blockading Squadron based upon all available historical documentation.

== Assigned to the North Atlantic Blockade ==
After sailing to Baltimore, Maryland, 24 December, Henry Brinker arrived Hatteras Inlet 10 January 1862 to begin her duties as a unit of the North Atlantic Blockading Squadron.

=== Participating in the attack on Roanoke Island ===
Her first major action was the joint attack on Roanoke Island, the gateway to Albemarle Sound. Henry Brinker engaged Confederate shore batteries 7 February and helped to clear the obstructions next morning which paved the way for the capture of the Southern positions. Thus Norfolk, Virginia, was cut off from its lines of supply and the Union gained an important advantage.

The Confederate squadron under Flag Officer Lynch which had been at Roanoke Island withdrew up the Pasquotank River, with Union ships in hot pursuit. Henry Brinker and the other ships of Commander Rowan's flotilla engaged the squadron and batteries at Elizabeth City, North Carolina, capturing or sinking all the Southern vessels and occupying the town.

=== Attack and capture of New Bern, North Carolina ===
Continuing their series of spectacular successes in North Carolina, Commander Rowan and General Ambrose Burnside next captured New Bern, North Carolina. The flotilla, composed of thirteen warships including Henry Brinker and a group of troop transports, got underway 12 March from Hatteras Inlet and arrived New Bern the next day. The Confederate forts were engaged by gunboats, the obstructions surmounted, and troops landed under cover of Navy guns. New Bern and a great quantity of important supplies were soon in Union hands.

Henry Brinker was assigned to Albemarle Sound following the victory at New Bern, patrolling to suppress trade and contain the Confederate guerrilla activity. On this duty she participated in a reconnaissance up the Chowan River 3–23 August 1862.

For the next months Henry Brinker patrolled from her base at Hatteras Inlet, stopping frequently at Plymouth, North Carolina, and New Bern, North Carolina. During this period she performed occasional guard duty at Hatteras Inlet as well.

=== Expedition up the Bay River ===
The ship participated 22 June 1863 in another expedition, this time up the Bay River, and in company with USS Shawsheen captured Confederate schooner Henry Clay and another small schooner carrying turpentine.

=== Final operations of the war ===
Henry Brinker continued her operations in the Sound until ordered back to Hampton Roads in November 1863 for repairs. Stopping at Hampton Roads, she continued to Baltimore, Maryland, where she repaired until 9 April 1864, when she was assigned as a ship's tender to USS Minnesota at Newport News, Virginia. Remaining inactive at Newport News until June, Henry Brinker was sent up the Pamunkey River to White House, Virginia, 23 June to support the Army in local operations. After briefly rendering fire support, the ship returned to Yorktown, Virginia.

== Post-war decommissioning and sale ==
Henry Brinker returned to Hampton Roads to repair 1 July 1864, and remained there until decommissioned 29 June 1865. She was sold 20 July 1865.
