= USS Underwriter (1852) =

Steamer gunboat (in service 1861–1864)

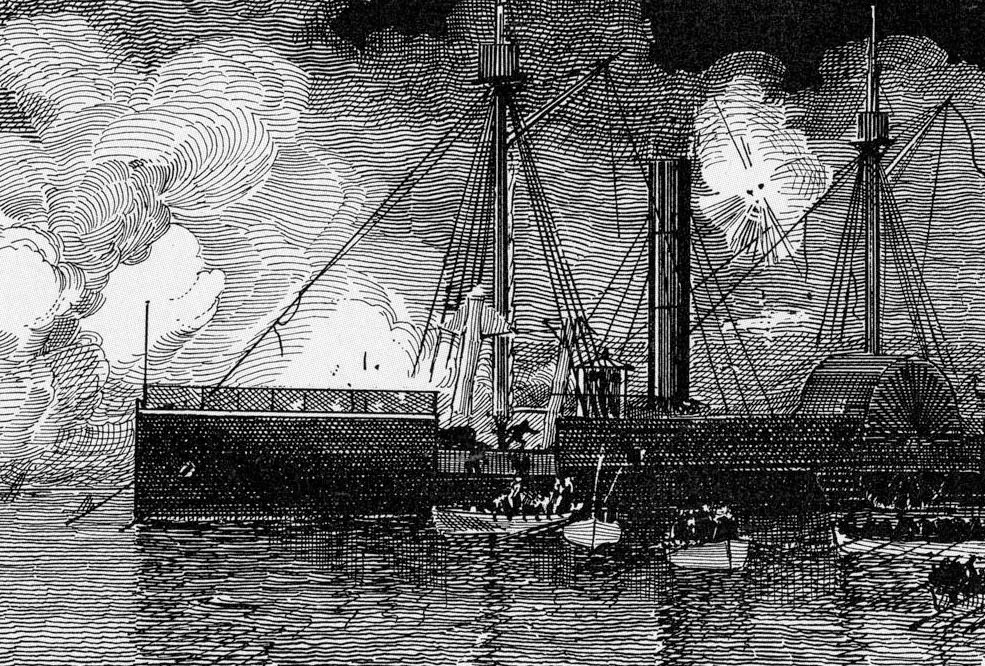
- Confederate troops abandoning USS Underwriter after setting her afire, 2 February 1864

History

United States
- Name: USS Underwriter
- Launched: 1852
- Acquired: 23 Aug 1861
- Commissioned: 22 Aug 1861
- Fate: Burned by Confederate forces, 2 Feb 1864

General characteristics
- Type: Sidewheel steamship
- Tonnage: 341 gross (merchant service)
- Length: 170 ft (52 m)
- Beam: 23 ft 7 in (7.19 m)
- Draft: 8 ft 1 in (2.46 m)
- Propulsion: Steam engine
- Armament: 1 × 80-pounder rifled gun; 1 × 8 in (203 mm) smoothbore gun

USS Underwriter was a 341-ton sidewheel steamer that was purchased for military use by the Union Navy during the American Civil War.

Underwriter was outfitted as a gunboat, whose primary task was to prevent ships from penetrating the Union blockade of Southern ports.

== Construction and design ==
Underwriter—a wooden-hulled side-wheel steamer—was built for merchant service at Brooklyn, New York in 1852. She was 175 feet (53 m) in length, with a beam of 23 feet (7.0 m) and draft of 8 feet (2.4 m). Her registered (gross) tonnage was 341.

Underwriter was powered by a single-cylinder steam engine of unknown type, with bore of 48 inches (120 cm) and stroke of 9 feet (2.7 m). Her boilers, of the double return drop flue type, were 30 feet (9.1 m) in length by 9 feet (2.7 m) in diameter. Both engine and boilers were built by the West Street Foundry of Brooklyn.

== Service history ==
Underwriter was purchased by the Navy at New York City on 23 August 1861, and commissioned there on 22 August, Lt. James M. Prichett in command. Assigned to the Potomac Flotilla, USS Underwriter arrived in the Potomac River off Aquia Creek, Virginia, ill-prepared for active duty, and was sent to the Washington Navy Yard on 28 August for extensive repairs and alterations. While laid up, she was transferred to the North Atlantic Blockading Squadron. The vessel sailed for Hampton Roads, Virginia, on 3 October and joined the blockade off Hatteras Inlet, North Carolina, on 9 October.

Underwriter, USS General Putnam, and USS Ceres left Hatteras Inlet on 14 November 1861, and proceeded southwest to Ocracoke Inlet. There, they scuttled three stone-filled hulks, effectively closing the inlet to Confederate shipping. The three vessels also participated in the capture of Confederate works on Roanoke Island, North Carolina, on 7–8 February 1862, and saw action during the capture of Elizabeth City, North Carolina, on 10 February 1862. On 13 February 1862, Underwriter, USS John L. Lockwood, USS Shawsheen, and USS Whitehead proceeded up the North River, North Carolina, and placed obstructions at the mouth of the Albemarle and Chesapeake Canal. Underwriter assisted in the capture of New Bern, North Carolina, on 13–14 March 1862, knocking out a Confederate battery along the Neuse River during the attack. After additional support duties in both Albemarle and Albemarle Sounds, the vessel returned to Baltimore, Maryland, on 1 June 1862 for repairs.

Underwriter left Baltimore in late July 1862 and returned to New Bern. She remained in the Neuse River off New Bern performing various reconnaissance and dispatch assignments—occasionally moving to different points in the North Carolina sounds. Underwriter sailed to Plymouth, North Carolina, in August and towed the prize schooner Young Rover to New Bern on 13 August 1862. She was ordered to report to Plymouth for reconnaissance duty on 4 December and sailed from there to Hatteras Inlet on 17 December. On 4 January 1863, she sailed up the Chowan River 15 miles beyond Winfield, North Carolina, and destroyed Confederate supplies. Underwriter evacuated Union forces from Winfield during the siege and threatened capture of Plymouth in April 1863. She was stationed in Albemarle Sound later that month and returned to Plymouth in May. Underwriter stood down the Neuse River in June and was ordered to report to the blockade off Hatteras Inlet on 16 December 1863. She returned to New Bern on 10 January 1864.

While lying at anchor off New Bern early on 2 February 1864, Underwriter was captured by a Confederate boat crew led by Commander John Taylor Wood, grandson of President Zachary Taylor and a nephew of President Jefferson Davis. They caught Underwriter crew by surprise and took her in hand-to-hand combat, killing Acting Master Jacob Westervelt and capturing most of the vessel's complement. The gunboat did not have steam up, so the Confederates burned her, as they were under heavy fire from surrounding Union batteries. The ship burned to the waterline, but her machinery was relatively unscathed. Her boilers and engines were later salvaged. The wreck was rediscovered in 1986 and a gun carriage from it salvaged the following year.
