= USS John L. Lockwood =

Gunboat of the United States Navy

History

United States
- Launched: 1854
- Acquired: 1 September 1861
- Commissioned: 21 September 1861
- Decommissioned: 23 May 1865
- Fate: Sold, 15 September 1865

General characteristics
- Displacement: 180 tons
- Length: 114 ft (35 m)
- Beam: 24 ft (7.3 m)
- Draft: 6 ft 6 in (1.98 m)
- Propulsion: steam engine; side-wheel propelled
- Speed: 11 knots (20 km/h; 13 mph)
- Complement: 30
- Armament: 1 × 80-pounder rifle; 1 × 12-pounder rifle; 1 × 12-pounder smooth bore gun

USS John L. Lockwood was a steamer acquired by the Union Navy during the American Civil War. She was needed by the Navy to be part of the fleet of ships to prevent blockade runners from entering ports in the Confederacy.

== Service history ==
John L. Lockwood built at Athens, New York, in 1854; was purchased at New York City 1 September 1861; and commissioned at Washington, D.C., 21 September, Acting Master William F. North in command. John L. Lockwood was assigned to the North Atlantic Blockading Squadron 25 September with whom she steadfastly served throughout the war. She took station off the New York River 30 September and remained there on blockade duty until ordered to Hampton Roads, Virginia, to guard USS Congress and USS Cumberland. With USS Shawsheen she shelled Virginia infantry on Yorktown Road a few miles above Camp Butler 23 November. The following day John L. Lockwood departed Hampton Roads for repairs at Baltimore, Maryland, and she decommissioned upon arrival 25 November. Back in fighting trim, she recommissioned 6 December and returned to Hampton Roads. Assisted by USS Morse, she engaged three Confederate batteries on Sewell's Point 29 December.

John L. Lockwood was ordered to Hatteras Inlet 2 February 1862 to take part in combined operations which struck the Confederacy with heavy and costly blows wherever water reached within the North Carolina Sounds. She was with Flag Officer Goldsborough during operations against Roanoke Island 7 February bombarding Confederate positions with deadly effective fire. The next day with eight other ships she cut the chain connecting two vessels which obstructed the channel, thus clearing a passage for the Union ships into Albemarle Sound. This victory and the follow-up operations in the sounds severed Norfolk's main supply lines, secured the North Carolina coast, diverted important strength from the main Confederate Armies, and weakened the South's ability to resist at sea. At the end of the fighting, Captain Alex Murray who commanded Goldborough's second column praised John L. Lockwood for being "conspicuously in the foreground throughout the bombardment."

With Roanoak Island secure, the fleet moved on to Elizabeth City, North Carolina, to destroy Confederate gunboats and interrupt the South's canal communications to the north of Albemarle Sound. The next major amphibious operation, the attack on Confederate batteries on the Neuse River 13 March, resulted in Union occupation of New Bern, North Carolina, on the 14th. On 23 April, with USS Whitehead and USS General Putnam, John L. Lockwood, blocked the mouth of the Chesapeake Bay and Albemarle Canal near Elizabeth City, North Carolina, sinking a schooner and other obstructions inside the waterway. She remained in North Carolina's inland waters patrolling the innumerable inlets and streams and assisting Army units ashore until sailing from Hatteras Inlet for repairs at Hampton Roads 3 September 1863. Refitting completed, John L. Lockwood departed Norfolk Navy Yard 8 January 1864 and arrived New Bern 14 January to resume duty in the sounds. She captured sloop Twilight at Elizabeth City. During most of her further service she was stationed at New Bern where after the war she decommissioned 23 May 1865.

She was towed to Baltimore late in May and thence taken to Washington 27 July. John L. Lockwood was sold at Washington to Mr. Cresset of New York 15 September 1865 and redocumented Henry Smith 3 April 1866. The Army purchased and renamed her Chester A. Arthur 30 June 1876.
