= USS Ben Morgan =

History

United States
- Name: USS Ben Morgan
- Ordered: as Mediator
- Laid down: date unknown
- Launched: 1826
- Acquired: May 27, 1861
- Commissioned: circa 1861
- Decommissioned: circa 1865
- Stricken: 1865 (est.)
- Fate: Sold, November 30, 1865

General characteristics
- Type: Hospital ship
- Displacement: 407 long tons (414 t)
- Length: Unknown
- Beam: Unknown
- Draught: 15 ft (4.6 m)
- Propulsion: Sail
- Speed: varied
- Complement: 35
- Armament: Unknown

USS Ben Morgan was a schooner acquired by the Union Navy during the American Civil War. She was used by the Union Navy as a hospital ship in support of the Union Navy blockade of Confederate waterways.

== Purchase ==
The Ben Morgan was a ship rigged (not schooner), sailing vessel launched at Philadelphia in 1826. Some sources state that this vessel was at one time named "Mediator" but evidence of that is lacking. Prior to being in government service this vessel was engaged in the whale fishery out of New London, CT starting in 1843. She completed five whaling voyages. At that time she was listed in whale fishery records as the Benjamin Morgan, which indicates this was her proper name. The Benjamin Morgan was purchased at New York City by the Navy on May 27, 1861. In naval records her name appears shortened, perhaps never officially, as "Ben Morgan." She also appears as "Ben Morgan" in the 1861 and 1862 shipping registers. However, naval yard surveys of the vessel at the National Archives in College Park give her name as "Benjamin Morgan" as do letters of those who were later aboard her in naval service. No logs for this ship have survived, and no record of her commissioning ceremony — if any indeed occurred — has been found. Nevertheless, Ben Morgan was fitted out as a hospital ship and was sent to Hampton Roads, Virginia, to take over the role of the Norfolk Naval Hospital which had fallen into Confederate hands when Union forces evacuated Norfolk, Virginia, on April 20, 1861, three days after the Virginia convention had voted for secession.

== Hampton Roads hospital ship ==
Commanded by Master James B. Gordon, the ship lay anchored in Hampton Roads as she cared for sick and wounded sailors from the Union warships blockading the Confederate coast. She also served concurrently as a collier and supply ship. Possibly the highlight of her medical service began on March 8, 1862, when she received on board men who had been wounded during the deadly foray into Hampton Roads of CSS Virginia, the former Federal screw frigate Merrimack which Union officers had put to the torch and scuttled just before abandoning the Norfolk Navy Yard almost a year before. Raised, rebuilt, protected by a thick covering of iron plates, and armed with a sharp, strong prow, the Southern ironclad ram had proved to be almost impervious to shot and shell as she destroyed Union frigates Congress and Cumberland and damaged other Federal warships before withdrawing for the night.

== Monitor and the Virginia ==
That evening, Monitor, arrived in Hampton Roads and prepared to challenge Virginia upon her return. Built with a flat deck and an extremely low freeboard, Monitor's hull above the waterline was protected by strong iron plate which, the following day, enabled her to fight her Southern ironclad opponent to a standstill. This action saved the remaining Union fleet at Hampton Roads — including Ben Morgan — from almost certain destruction, maintained the blockade, and enabled the threatened Union Army of the Potomac to continue its drive toward Richmond, Virginia.

== Peninsula Campaign ==
These developments prompted the Confederates to evacuate Norfolk on 9 May, and Northern troops entered on the following day. However, heavy Union casualties during the Peninsula Campaign filled the Norfolk Naval Hospital with wounded soldiers and prevented the U.S. War Department from returning that facility to the Navy until September 1862. Thus Ben Morgan remained busy at Hampton Roads seeing to Navy needs.

== Staff moves ashore in Richmond ==
Meanwhile, the buildup of the fleet to tighten the Union blockade of the South increased the Navy's need for arms and ammunition in Hampton Roads, and the task of storing ordnance supplies was added to Ben Morgan's duties. In June 1862, when the Navy occupied a vacant building near Fort Norfolk, Ben Morgan's embarked medical team — headed by Assistant Surgeon James H. Macomber — went ashore to turn that structure into a temporary naval hospital. This freed the ship to devote herself exclusively to her logistical missions. From that time on, she lay anchored in Hampton Roads — some distance from other ships lying there — while laden with explosives and moored at Norfolk when carrying a less dangerous cargo.

== Final operations ==
Early in the spring of 1863, the ship was surveyed and condemned; but the need for her services had proved so great that she continued to function in Hampton Roads until autumn when she entered the Norfolk Navy Yard for repairs and recaulking. She was scheduled to perform similar duties at New Berne, North Carolina, upon the completion of the yard work; but smallpox broke out among her crew and the ship remained in quarantine until after another vessel had taken her place in the North Carolina Sounds. As a result, when she was ready to resume her labors, Ben Morgan returned to Hampton Roads and served in the Norfolk vicinity until she returned to New York City after the collapse of the Confederacy. She was sold there to a Mr. Hammill on November 30, 1865.
