= USS Gemsbok (1861) =

Gunboat of the United States Navy

History

United States
- Acquired: 7 September 1861
- Commissioned: 30 August 1861
- Decommissioned: 11 July 1865
- Stricken: 1865 (est.)
- Fate: Sold, circa 11 July 1865

General characteristics
- Length: 141 ft 7 in (43.15 m)
- Beam: 31 ft (9.4 m)
- Draft: 17 ft (5.2 m)
- Propulsion: sail
- Speed: Unknown
- Armament: 4 × 8 in (200 mm) guns; 2 × 32-pounders

USS Gemsbok was a bark acquired by the Union Navy during the American Civil War. She was used by the Navy as a gunboat, but, later in the war, she was also used as a collier and as a storeship.

Gemsbok was purchased on 7 September 1861 at Boston, Massachusetts, and commissioned on 30 August 1861 at the Boston Navy Yard, Acting Volunteer Lieutenant Lewis Drake Voorhees in command.

== South Atlantic Blockade ==
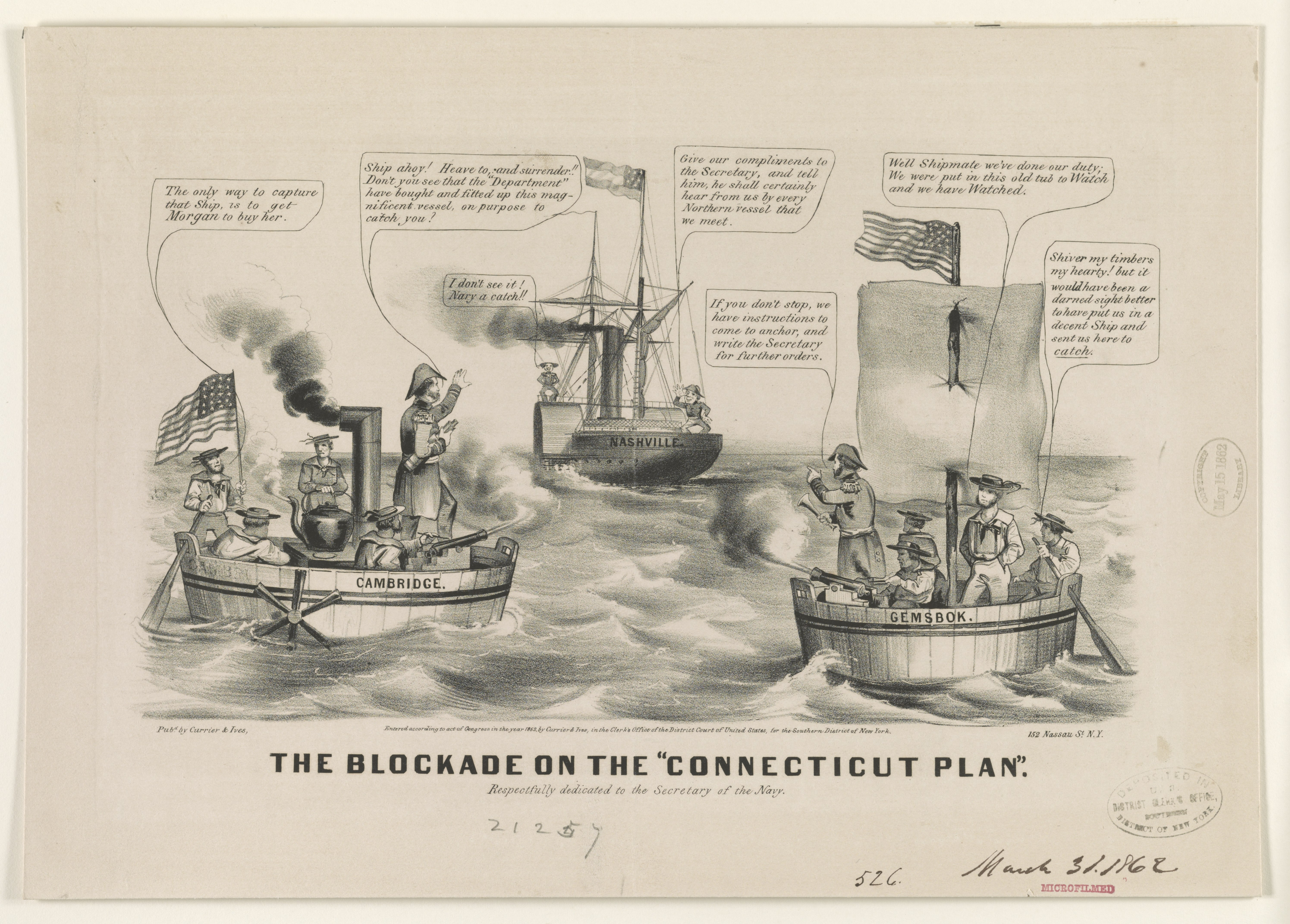
The Blockade on the "Connecticut Plan"

Assigned to the South Atlantic Blockading Squadron, Gemsbok sailed from Boston on 6 September 1861 for her duty station off Wilmington, North Carolina.

On 19 September, she captured schooner Harmony off Cape Hatteras and three days later took schooner Mary E. Pindar off Federal Point, North Carolina. Schooner Beverly fell to Gemsbok just outside Frying Pan Shoals on 3 October, while on 18 October the English brig Ariel — loaded with salt – was captured off Wilmington.

In November Gemsbok reported for blockade duty at Beaufort, North Carolina. On 16 January 1862, her crew – with that of Albatross – boarded and burned York, grounded near Bogue Inlet, North Carolina, while unloading supplies from Dublin.

== Bombardment and capture of Fort Macon ==
On 25 April, Gemsbok in company with other warships bombarded Fort Macon, North Carolina. In the last engagement, she had much of her rigging shot away. During the capture of Fort Macon, two English ships — Alliance and Gondar — were taken as prizes; Gemsbok convoyed them to the Chesapeake capes, from where they sailed to New York City while she put in at Hampton Roads, Virginia on 10 May.

== Sent south to protect Union shipping ==
Subsequently, she was ordered to Boston on 27 August to fill up her complement and then to report for duty with Rear Admiral Samuel F. DuPont at Port Royal, South Carolina. From there, she sailed to Turtle Harbor, Florida for the protection of colliers supplying the West Indies squadron.

On 10 December, Union Army transport Menemon Sanford grounded on a reef south of Key West, Florida, and Gemsbok sent a launch and crew to kedge her off, taking aboard many officers and men later debarked at Key West.

Peter Lefevre, a First Lieutenant in the 156th Regiment New York State Volunteers wrote home on 11 December 1862:

We are all safely off the M. Sanford. I am with the greater part of the regiment on board the U.S. Bark of War "Gemsbok". Johan is aboard the U.S. Steam transport Black Stone which has the bark in tow. We are all safe, and for all I can see contented and happy. Not a man has even been bruised. Providence has surrounded us with success of favorable circumstances.

=== Employed as a collier and storeship ===
In February 1863, Gemsbok was attached to the West Indies Squadron to be employed as a coal and store ship. Returning to New York City on 19 July, she decommissioned there.

On 19 July 1864, she was ordered to Port Royal, and – after recommissioning at New York on 23 December – reached that port on 8 January 1865. She served on blockade duty in waters off Georgia and South Carolina; in May 1865 the "Gemsbok" captured the vessel "Troup" at Dobay Sound, Georgia."Gemsbok" was also a guard ship and storeship before returning to the New York Navy Yard on 17 June.

== Final decommissioning and sale ==
Decommissioned in New York City on 11 July, Gemsbok was sold at auction to Smith & Co. at New York.
