= Dolphin (cutter) =

Dolphin was a New Zealand cutter of 10 tons.

== Voyages and notable incidents ==
Dolphin was a cutter-rigged cargo boat of 10 tons, belonging Lyttelton Harbour.

== Wreck ==
In early December 1862, Dolphin had sailed to one of the bays of the harbour to load lime.

On starting back to Lyttelton, the wind and tide were both unfavourable. Dolphin drifted and the crew were unable to wear the vessel. It was carried on to rocks near Quail Island, capsized, and became a total wreck. The crew of three escaped in the dinghy.
