= Rio Peguá =

Coordinates: 1°44′N 68°08′W

Rio Peguá is a watercourse in Brazil in the city of Brasília.
