= USS General Putnam (1857) =

Gunboat of the United States Navy

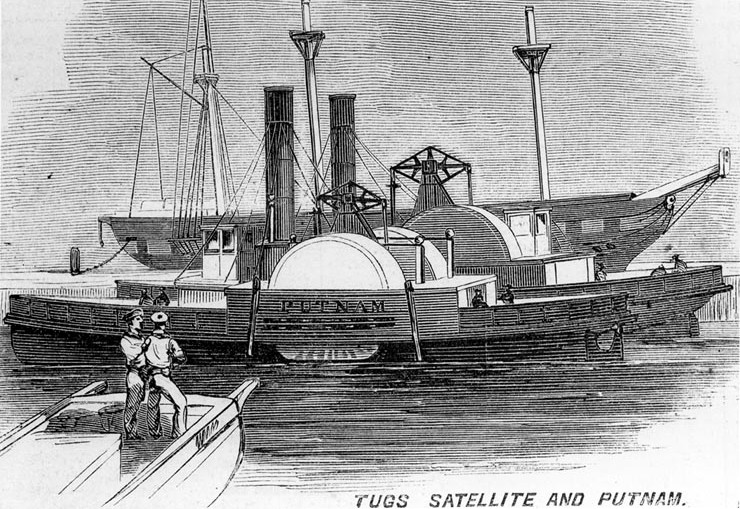
- General Putnam (foreground) and Satellite.

History

United States
- Ordered: as William G. Putnam
- Launched: 1857
- Acquired: 24 July 1861
- Commissioned: 13 September 1861
- Decommissioned: 2 June 1865
- In service: 1865
- Out of service: 1891
- Fate: Sold in 1893

General characteristics
- Displacement: 149 tons
- Length: 103 ft 6 in (31.55 m)
- Beam: 22 ft 0 in (6.71 m)
- Draft: 7 ft 2 in (2.18 m)
- Propulsion: steam engine; side-wheel propelled
- Speed: 7 knots
- Complement: 62
- Armament: 12 September 1861 one 32-pdr.; 14 September 1861 add one 20-pdr. Parrott rifle; 13 May 186 one 20-pdr. Parrott rifle, two 24-pdr.howitzers; 2 June 1863 add one 12-pdr.

USS General Putnam – also known as the USS William G. Putnam – was acquired by the Union Navy during the first year of the American Civil War and outfitted as a gunboat and assigned to the Union blockade of the Confederate States of America. She also served as a tugboat and as a ship's tender when so required.

== A ship with two names ==
The Navy purchased William G. Putnam, a wooden-hulled tug built in 1857 at Brooklyn, New York, on 24 July 1861 at New York City and renamed the vessel General Putnam soon thereafter. The vessel's name later returned to William G. Putnam while in the service of the U.S. Navy.

== Civil War service ==
=== Assigned to the Atlantic Blockading Squadron ===
On 13 September 1861, with Acting Master William J. Hotchkiss in command, William G. Putnam departed New York, bound for Washington, D.C., and arrived at the Washington Navy Yard three days later. On the night of the 17th, she headed down river to join the Potomac Flotilla but the next day was ordered to join the Atlantic Blockading Squadron at Old Point Comfort, Virginia, where she arrived on 23 September. Within a few days, the armed tug began operating off the North Carolina coast where her initial duty was to reconnoiter Ocracoke Inlet.

She also patrolled off Hatteras Inlet and assisted in the sinking of three stone-laden schooners in an attempt to help tighten the blockade by impeding navigation and obstructing the inlets in the area. On 29 October 1861, the Navy Department divided the Atlantic Blockading Squadron into the North and South commands, and allocated William G. Putnam to the newly established North Atlantic Blockading Squadron. The vessel continued to operate primarily in the waters of North Carolina.

=== Capture of Roanoke Island ===
In February 1862, the tug took part in the expedition which captured Roanoke Island, North Carolina. On the 6th, the day before the battle began, the side-wheel gunboats USS Ceres (1856) and USS William G. Putnam steamed a mile or so ahead of the main force to reconnoiter and discovered fifteen steamers and ten sailing vessels close inshore between Pork Point and Weir's Point, above the marshes of Croatan Sound.

The following day, the Union warships pressed their attack while the Union Army landed some 10,000 troops on Roanoke Island. William G. Putnam fired on a Confederate shore battery in an engagement that lasted all afternoon. The next morning, she resumed firing in company with USS Underwriter (1852) and other Federal warships as they started to pass a cluster of vessels which had been sunk as obstructions. Although running aground at one point during the fight and suffering a hit on the hurricane deck, William G. Putnam emerged with no casualties from the heavy shelling by enemy guns.

=== Raising the Stars and Stripes over Cobb Point Battery ===
On the 10th, Ceres ran aground off Elizabeth City, North Carolina, during the battle of Elizabeth City, and William G. Putnam pulled her free. In addition, the armed tug attempted to put out a fire that raged in the Confederate armed schooner Black Warrior nearby. The blaze proved to be beyond control, but the Union gunboat did manage to pick up a man from the water as he swam from the burning ship. In the operation, Union warships captured the CSS Ellis; obstructed the passage to the Albemarle and Chesapeake Canal; and raised the stars and stripes over Cobb Point battery.

Over the ensuing days William G. Putnam conducted daily reconnaissance in Currituck Sound and missions in the Albemarle & Chesapeake Canal. For the next six months, the gunboat carried detachments of Army troops and equipment on missions to search out and destroy rebel supply boats. While stationed at Plymouth or New Berne, the ship operated in the Pasquotank and Chowan rivers and the creeks of Dingaderry, Rochahock, and Seems.

=== Ordered to maintain a "strict and vigorous" blockade ===
Needing repairs, William G. Putnam, sailed for Hampton Roads and arrived there on 22 October with intelligence data for Rear Admiral Samuel P. Lee. On 6 November, the gunboat received orders to remain in Virginia waters and to maintain a

strict and vigorous" blockade of the western shore of the Chesapeake Bay between Fortress Monroe and the south side of the Piankatank River.

Proceeding to Yorktown, Virginia, the tug joined a small flotilla operating with the Army in an attempt to take Mathews Court House up the East River. Ordered to capture or destroy all Confederate vessels that could be used to run the Union blockade, William G. Putnam carried out her assignment until the successful completion of the campaign against Mathews Court House on 23 November 1862.

=== Repaired at Baltimore and returned to service ===
Subsequently, serving as guard vessel in the York River and off neighboring coasts, the tug cooperated with the Union Army in landing troops on expeditions up to West Point, Virginia, and enforced the blockade by patrolling the region until 15 January 1863.

At that point her boilers broke down, and she was unable to move. Nevertheless, William G. Putnam remained on active service in those waters, stationed so as to enfilade Gloucester Point, until towed to Baltimore, Maryland, to receive a new boiler and rifle screening. The latter included iron plates placed around the forecastle, quarterdeck, and wheelhouse. She returned to her station in June 1863, helping to blockade Chesapeake Bay and its tributaries.

=== The ship's master is shot dead ===
While operating in the Piankatank River on blockade duties on 17 August, William G. Putnam and the ex-ferryboats USS Commodore Jones and USS Commodore Morris sighted a schooner, a canoe, and a launch running the blockade. Men from the steamers manned two cutters, two boats, and a gig and gave chase but soon encountered heavy sniper fire from Confederate soldiers and guerrillas in the woods. William G. Putnam's commanding officer, Acting Master Hotchkiss, fell mortally wounded in the first enemy volley, and the boats withdrew while returning fire. Acting Ensign William Jennings assumed command of William G. Putnam and the ship shelled the woods for about four miles as she dropped down river.

Subsequently, towed to Yorktown, Virginia, William G. Putnam was stationed at the mouth of Queen's Creek, where she formed an indispensable part of the defense of Yorktown while Major General Foster erected a citadel there. By that time, the gunboat, with an "overweight boiler," had become less useful for blockade duty; but she found profitable employment dragging for torpedoes (mines) near Yorktown.

Acting Master Hugh H. Savage took command of the armed tug off Newport News, Virginia, on 16 November 1863 and proceeded up the Nansemond River in early December, where she later captured a large boat and destroyed a canoe used by Confederate forces in the area for running mail across the river. William G. Putnam remained on picket duty off the mouth of the Nansemond River to intercept blockade runners until 15 December, when she returned to Newport News.

=== Covering the landing of Union Army troops ===
In February and March 1864, she patrolled the Back River and the Poquoson River and joined an expedition on 8 March to head up the Mattaponi River, convoying Army transports. The armed tug covered the landing of General Kilpatrick's troops at Sheppard's Landing, two miles above West Point, before proceeding to the mouth of the Rappahannock River and ascending to a point five miles below Urbanna, Virginia. On 13 March, William G. Putnam returned to Yorktown and later resumed her patrols on the Back and Poquoson rivers.

From mid-April 1864, William G. Putnam operated in joint Army-Navy operations in the James and Nansemond rivers, covering the landings of troops. She moved ahead of Union Army transports, dragging for torpedoes (mines) from Harrison's Bar to one mile above Bermuda Hundred, clearing a channel for the landing of troops at City Point and at Bermuda Hundred. She then operated with Brigadier General Charles K. Graham's gunboats, supporting the occupation of Fort Powhatan and Wilson's Wharf. William G. Putnam accompanied Army gunboats up the Appomattox River and anchored at Gilliam's Bar.

She reconnoitered the river below the bar and, by order of Brigadier General Graham, towing the U.S. Army gunboat Charles Chamberlain down the channel. Informed that Confederate pickets had advanced in force as far as Gilliam's Bar, the Union flotilla retreated on 11 May to Point of Rocks and shelled the nearby woods. During the action, William G. Putnam discovered the Confederate battery at Fort Clifton, opened fire on enemy guns and soon obtained the range. The enemy battery replied, but a shell from the gunboat's 24-pdr. howitzer exploded in the embrasure of their rifled gun, causing the Confederate gunners to break and run.

After that action, the Union steamer returned down river and engaged in further combat operations on the Appomattox River almost daily into June, remaining on guard against surprise attacks. Union forces repeated the attack upon Fort Clifton on 9 and 10 June, silencing the enemy battery.

On 28 July 1864, Rear Admiral Lee assigned William G. Putnam to a division under the command of Captain Melancton Smith operating on the James River. The gunboat also served on the Appomattox River and in Mobjack Bay until March 1865, when she returned to Yorktown. Detached from the North Atlantic Blockading Squadron on 18 March 1865, she patrolled the Rappahannock and St. Mary's rivers.

== Post-war activity ==
After the collapse of the Confederacy in April, the armed tug was ordered to the Washington Navy Yard with twenty-three other vessels from her division. William G. Putnam arrived there on 14 May and was decommissioned on 2 June 1865. The US Treasury Department bought her at auction for use by the Lighthouse Board, and as the tender General Putnam she was assigned to the 3rd Lighthouse District. Rammed and sunk after being assigned to the 2nd Lighthouse District, she was raised and repaired at a cost of $4,738 at Wilmington, Delaware.

Reassigned to the 3rd Lighthouse District, her name was shortened to simply Putnam in September 1869. She was rebuilt and lengthened to 135 feet in 1877 prior to being transferred back to the 2nd Lighthouse District. Overhauled in New York in August 1880, Putnam rebuilt yet again in 1889 for $18,500.

The Lighthouse Board transferred her to the 7th Lighthouse District in March 1891, based out of Key West, Florida. She was taken out of service in 1891 and sold in 1893 for $1,825. She then entered the merchant service as the SS Putnam, operating until 1896.
