= Hatteras Inlet =

Estuary in North Carolina, U.S.

Coordinates: 35°11′31″N 75°45′40″W

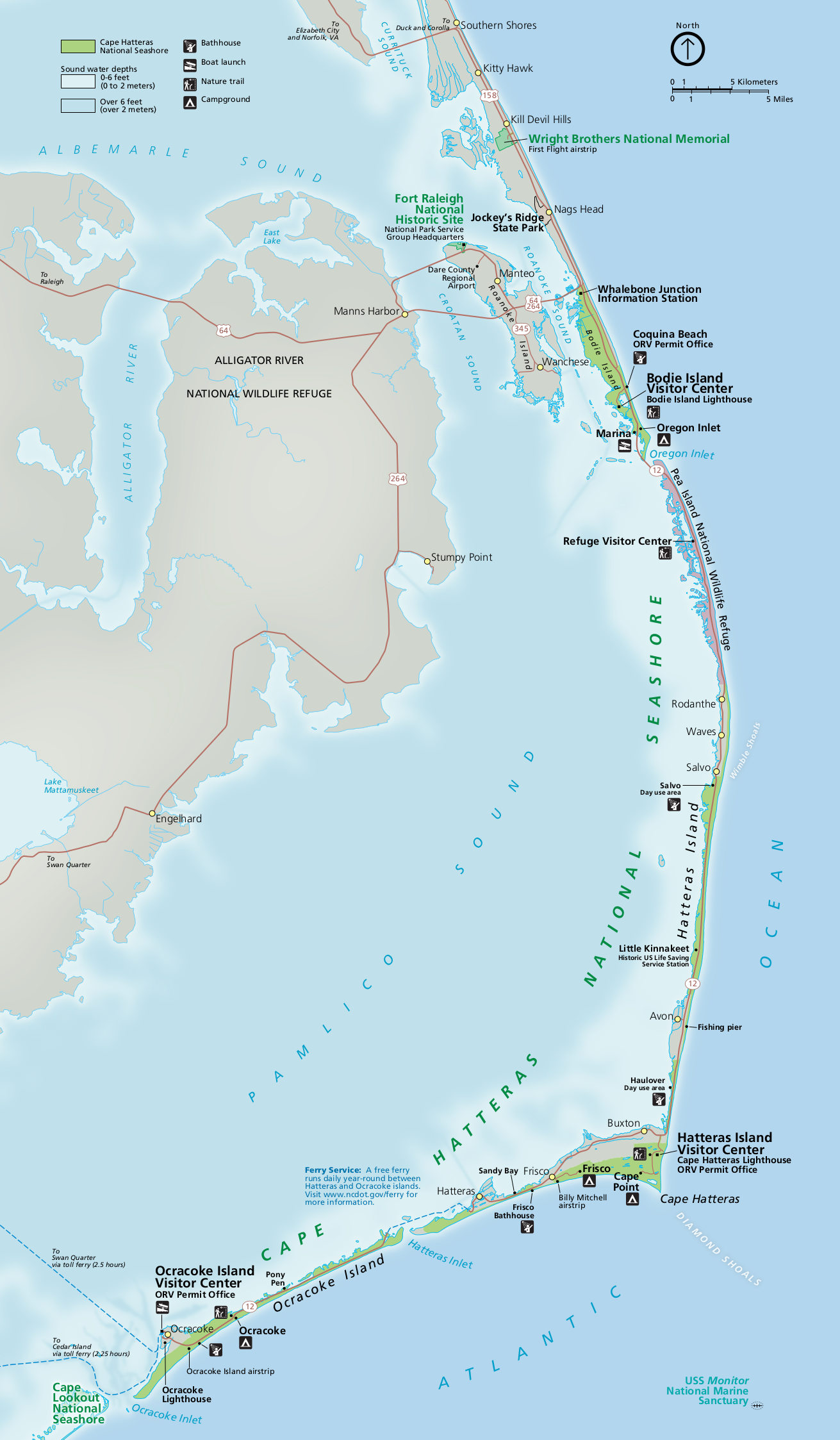
Map of the Outer Banks showing location of Hatteras Inlet

Hatteras Inlet is an estuary in North Carolina, located along the Outer Banks, separating Hatteras Island and Ocracoke Island. It connects the Atlantic Ocean to the Pamlico Sound. Hatteras Inlet is located entirely within Hyde County.

== History ==
The first "Hatteras Inlet" was formed south of the current inlet, but closed around 1764. The modern "Hatteras Inlet" was formed on September 7, 1846, by a violent gale. This massive storm was the same storm that opened present-day Oregon Inlet. The new inlet at Hatteras became a profitable inlet because it gave the Inner Banks, NC a quicker and easier route to travel to and from the Gulf Stream. It was easier to come into this inlet from the north than to Ocracoke. Because of the increase in commerce, Hatteras Village Post Office was established in 1858. The initial invasion of the North Carolina coast on Hatteras Island during the Civil War, called the Battle of Hatteras Inlet Batteries, came from Hatteras Inlet on August 28–29, 1861. The two Confederate forts guarding the inlet quickly fell.

== Hatteras Inlet today ==
The inlet today is approximately two miles across, but this distance changes daily because of the convection of brackish water. No bridge crosses Hatteras Inlet. A fleet of eight ferries, owned by the North Carolina Department of Transportation, provides a free 60-minute ride year round to people who want to traverse the inlet from Hatteras to Ocracoke. These ferries connect North Carolina State Highway 12 between the two islands.

== Map ==
Google Maps - Hatteras Inlet

| Preceded by Hatteras | Beaches of The Outer Banks | Succeeded by Ocracoke Island |
