= Morton Deyo =

United States admiral (1887–1973)

Morton Lyndholm Deyo
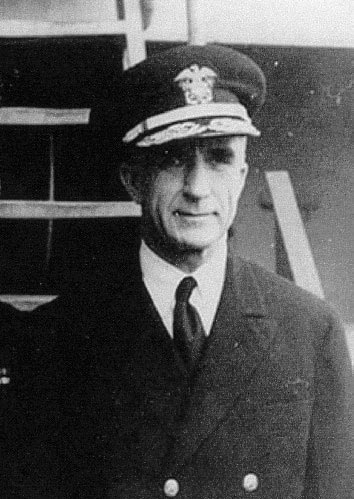
- Born: July 1, 1887; Poughkeepsie, New York
- Died: November 10, 1973 (aged 86); Kittery Point, Maine
- Burial place: United States Naval Academy Cemetery (Section 6, Plot 1288-A)
- Military career
- Allegiance: United States of America
- Branch: United States Navy
- Service years: 1907–1949
- Rank: Vice Admiral
- Conflicts: World War I World War II: Battle of Normandy; Battle of Okinawa
- Awards: Navy Distinguished Service Medal; Legion of Merit (2)

Vice Admiral Morton Lyndholm Deyo (1 July 1887 – 10 November 1973) was an officer in the United States Navy, who was a naval gunfire support task force commander of World War II.

Born on 1 July 1887 in Poughkeepsie, New York, he graduated from the United States Naval Academy in 1911, and served over a career of 38 years. His classmates at the Naval Academy included Harry W. Hill, Frank J. Lowry, George D. Murray, John W. Reeves, and Frederick L. Riefkohl. His highest Navy rank in active service was rear admiral, attaining vice admiral at retirement. He was awarded three medals of personal honor, the Distinguished Service Medal (Navy), and the Legion of Merit with Gold Star.

Deyo served in both the Atlantic and Pacific Fleets. In the Atlantic, he commanded the destroyers which provided the first American escort assistance to allied convoys to England just prior to the Japanese attack on Pearl Harbor. He later commanded naval gunfire support at Utah Beach in the Normandy invasion, Task Force 129 at the bombardment of Cherbourg, as well as during the invasion of Southern France.

When transferred to the Pacific, Rear Admiral Deyo assumed command of Cruiser Division 13 (CruDiv 13). He commanded gunfire and covering force for the assault and occupation of Battle of Okinawa. During the battle, he was the last naval commander to form a battle line with battleships as they prepared to intercept the Japanese battleship Yamato. At the war's end, he accepted the surrender of Japanese forces at Sasebo, Kyushu and directed the Allied Occupation of Western Japan.

== Early career ==
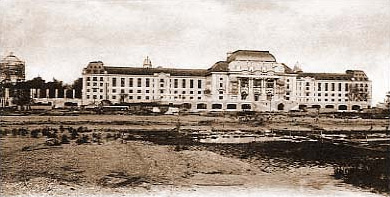
U.S. Naval Academy, Bancroft Hall. Class of 1911

Morton Deyo's career ashore meshed with the seagoing responsibilities he would take on at each stage of his career. Training at the U.S. Naval Academy prepared him in engineering and seamanship. He graduated as a member of the Class of 1911. Most of his academy years were under Superintendent Captain John M. Bowyer at a time of two-year rotations. Deyo then took his first assignment at sea aboard the battleship USS Virginia.

=== Caribbean service ===
Early assignments at sea placed Deyo in the Caribbean. He was aboard the battleship USS Virginia about the time she participated in coaling-at-sea operations. In the years of his service aboard Virginia, she took station off Tampico and Vera Cruz, Mexico. Deyo next served aboard the destroyer USS Duncan. In a tour cut short by decommissioning in 1914, Duncan went to the Caribbean for training, target practice and exercises. In 1914 and 1915, Deyo served aboard the armored cruiser USS Washington under Captain Edward W. Eberle, commanding. The ship was stationed off of Santo Domingo, Dominican Republic, for diplomatic service; Vera Cruz, Mexico; Cap Haitien, Haiti; and returned to Puerto Plata, Dominican Republic, when a crisis recurred there. Deyo's last tour in the Caribbean before marriage and World War I was aboard the destroyer USS Jenkins. She sailed to Tampico, Mexico and later supported the U.S. occupation of Vera Cruz. Jenkins was assigned patrol operations to search for possible German U-boats. Deyo married Maria Ten Eyck Decatur Mayo in 1916.

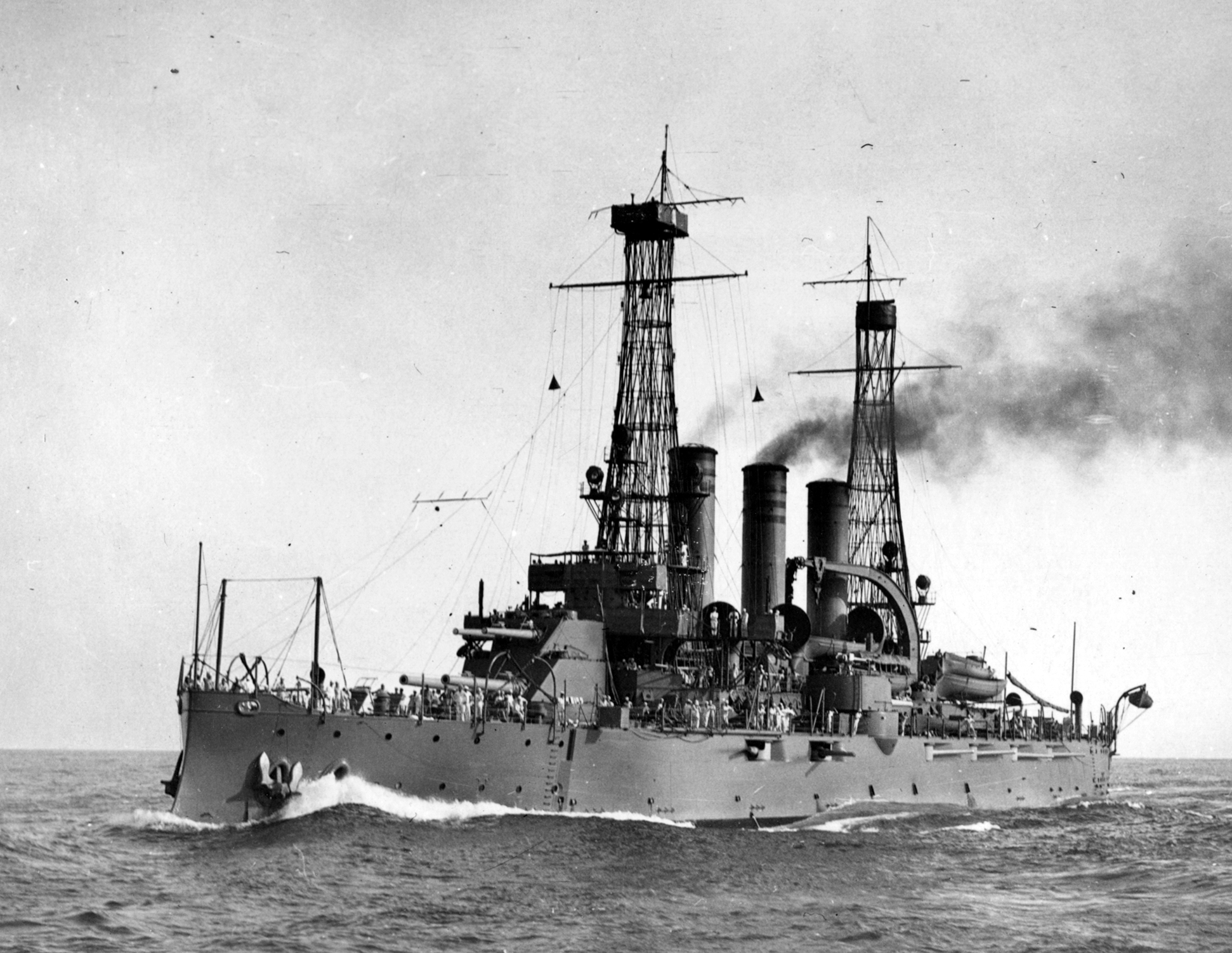
aboard Virginia (BB-13)- Virginia-class
1911–1913

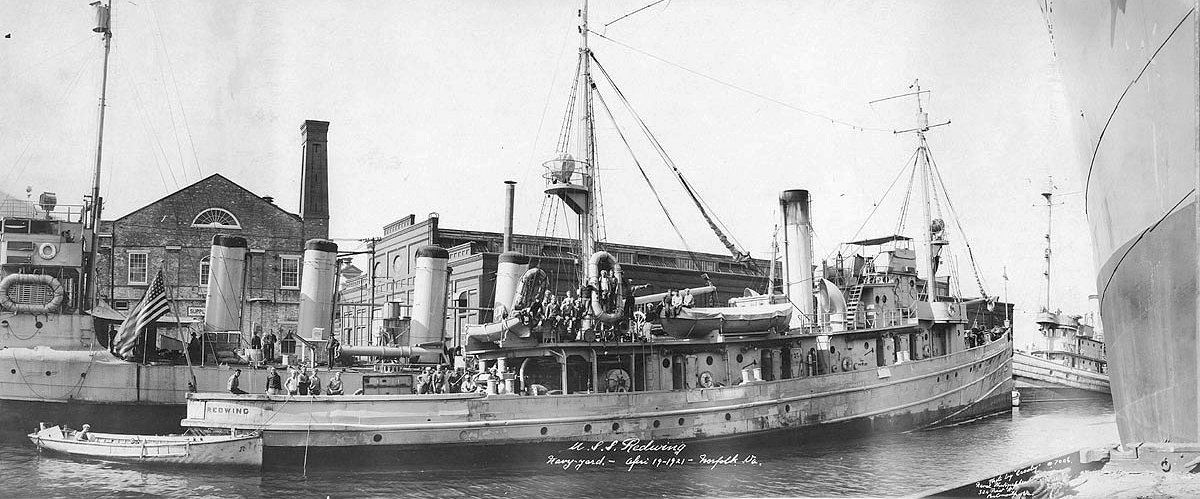
aboard Duncan (DD-46) – Cassin-class
1913–1914

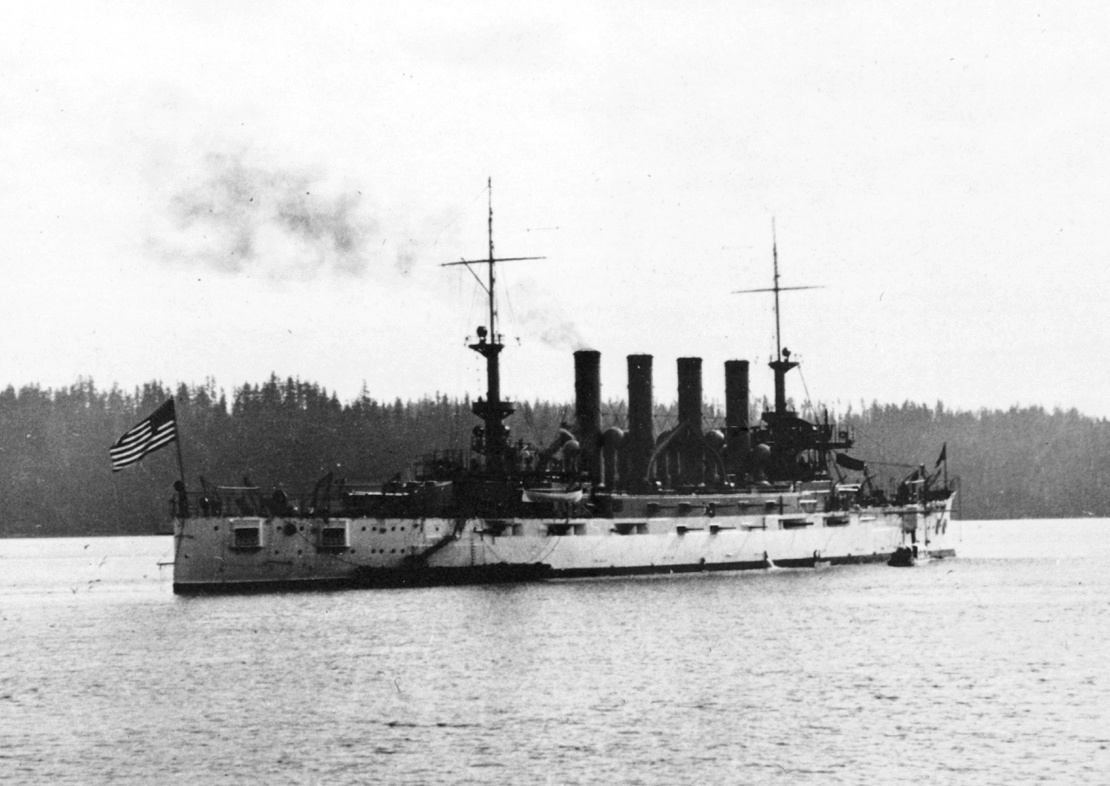
aboard Washington (ACR-11) – Tennessee-class
1914–1915

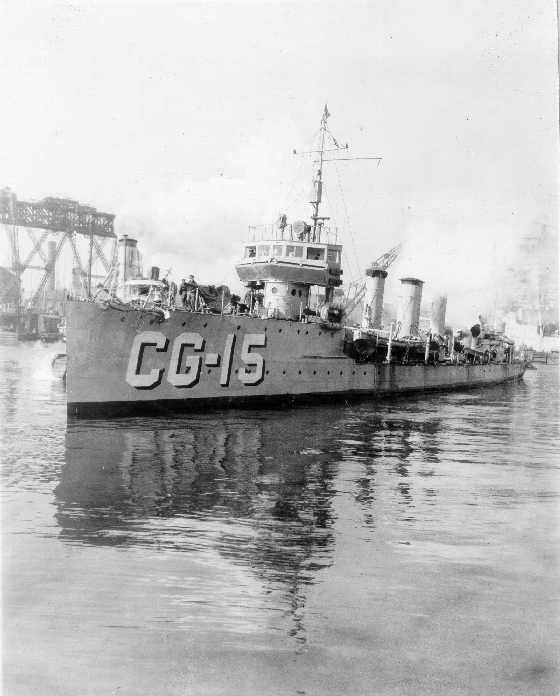
aboard Jenkins (DD-42) – Monaghan-class
1915–1916

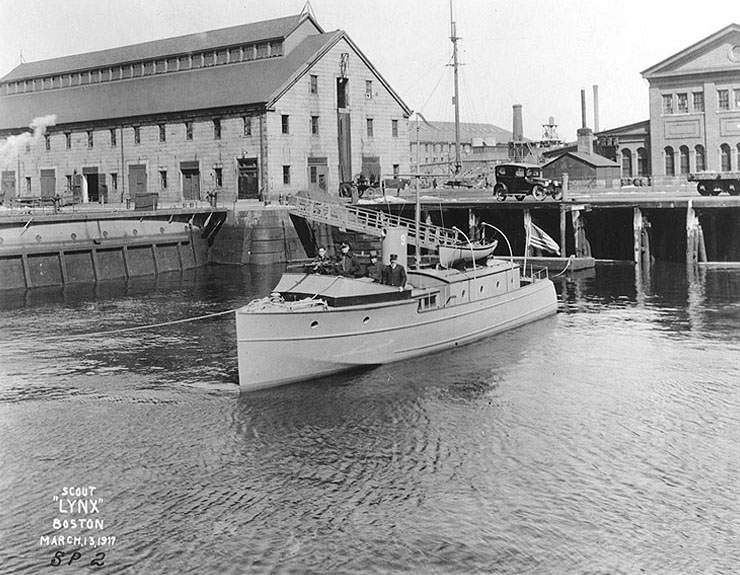
Aide to Commandant
First Naval District, 1920–1921

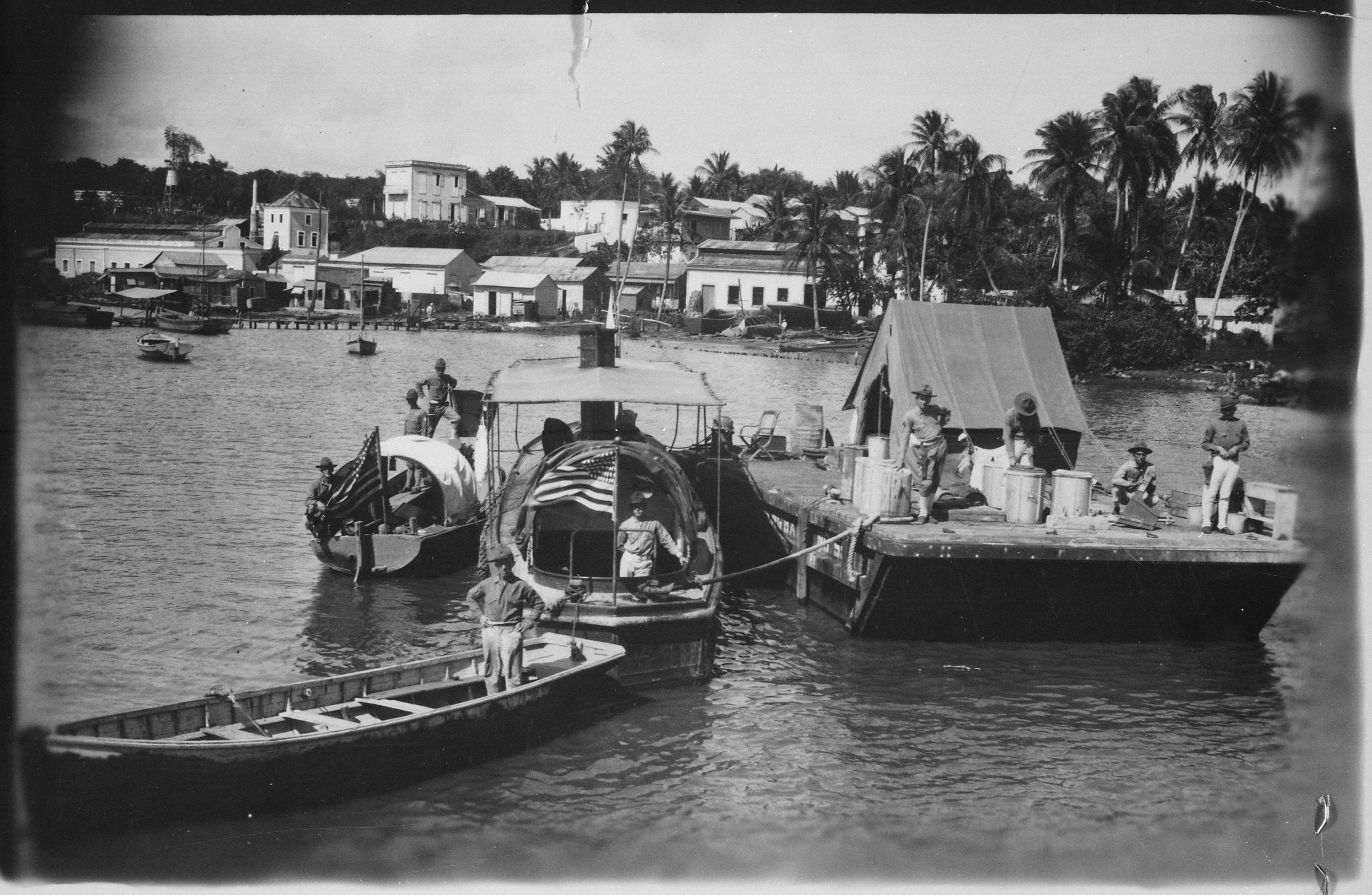
Staff, Military Governor
Santo Domingo, 1921–1923

As an aide to the Commandant, First Naval District, Boston, 1920–1921, Deyo was a part of an ongoing upgrading of the Naval District that would remain in place from 1920 to the outbreak of World War II. The First District absorbed the Second in 1919, and it expanded from a coastal strip to encompass inland states to more nearly correspond to Army districts. The District acquired its own full-time staff, gained new operational functions, and expanded administrative and logistical responsibilities. Proposal for reform of the Naval district regulations were to be revised to embody the lessons of World War I. This is fundamental naval strategy. Mahan had written, "deficient coast protection reacts unfavorably upon the war fleet, which in all its movements should be free from any responsibility for the mere safety of the ports it quits." Deyo's next assignment was as an aide to the U.S. military governor at Santo Domingo, Dominican Republic.

Service aboard one ship and command of another prepared Deyo for duty ashore in a politically and diplomatically sensitive role. In 1914–1915, Deyo had served on the armored cruiser USS Washington during service related to Santo Domingo, Dominican Republic, Vera Cruz, Mexico, and Cape Haitien, Haiti. Capt. Edward W. Eberle, commanding, was active in U.S. attempts to mediate between government and insurgent forces towards a constitutional government with "observed" elections. When then Lieutenant Commander Deyo had his first command, of the destroyer USS Morris, he was attached to the "Adriatic Detachment" performing political and diplomatic duties among nations of the former Austro-Hungarian Empire. In 1921–1923, Deyo served on the staff of the military governor closing out the American occupation of Santo Domingo. The military governor at the time was Warren Harding's appointment to fulfill his campaign promise to end the Wilson occupation of the Dominican Republic. Rear Adm. Samuel Robison served from 1921. The occupation officially ended July 1, 1924. In 1923 Deyo was assigned to the staff Battleship Fleet, aboard the battleship USS California.

=== World War I ===
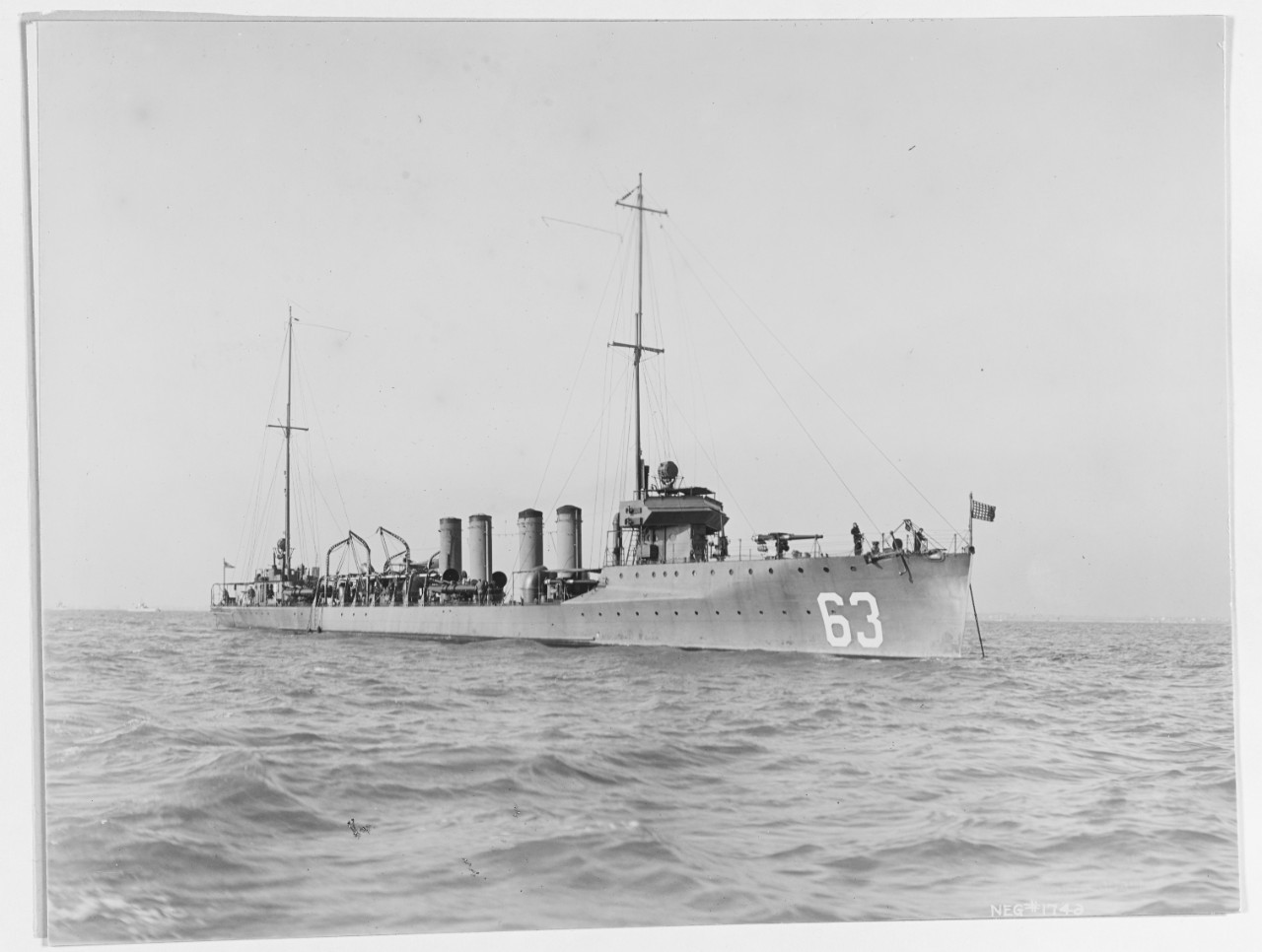
aboard Allen (DD-66), Sampson-class, Sampson pictured. 1911

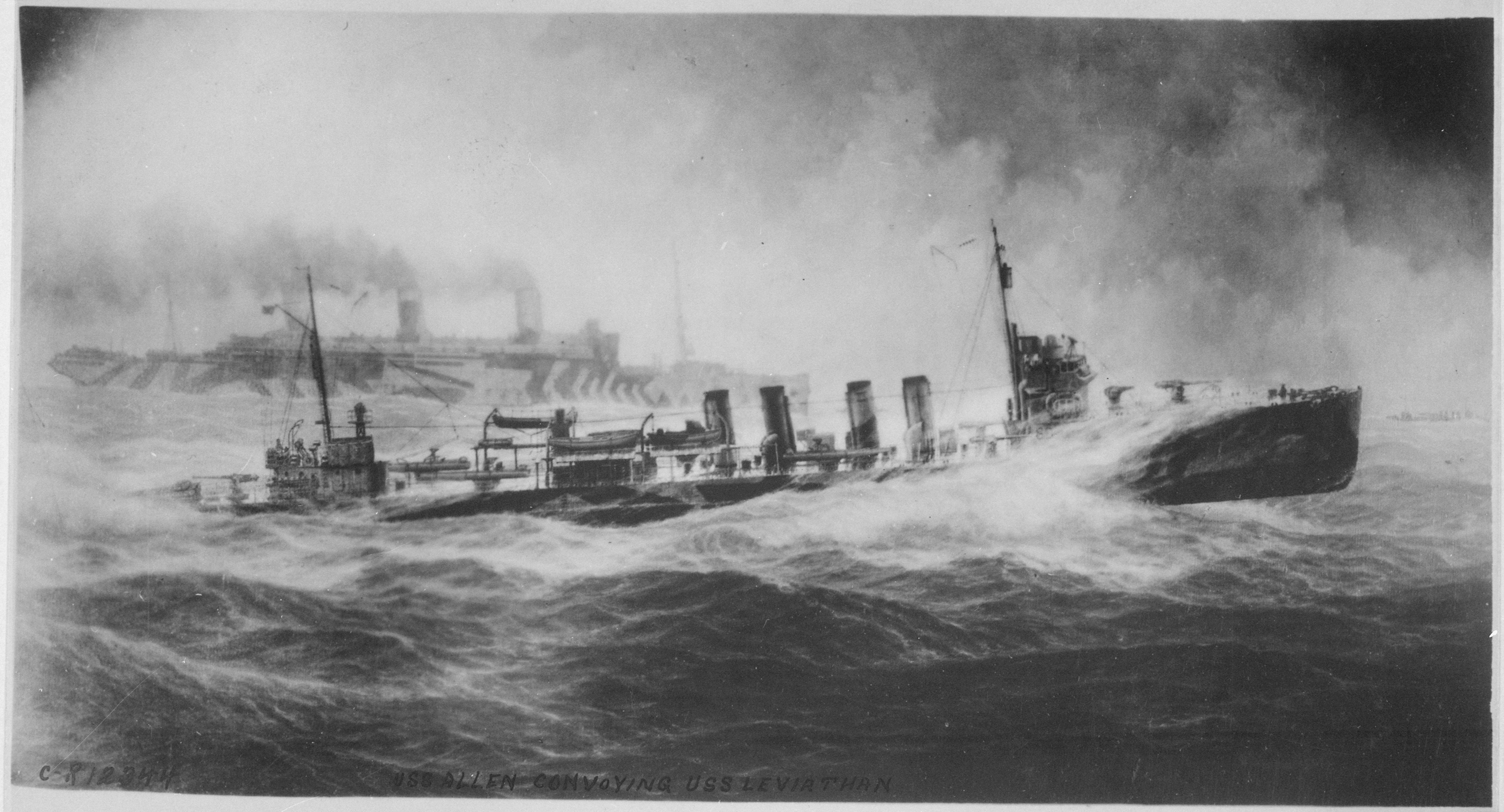
aboard destroyer Allen
escorting troopships
"Sim's Destroyers" 1916–18

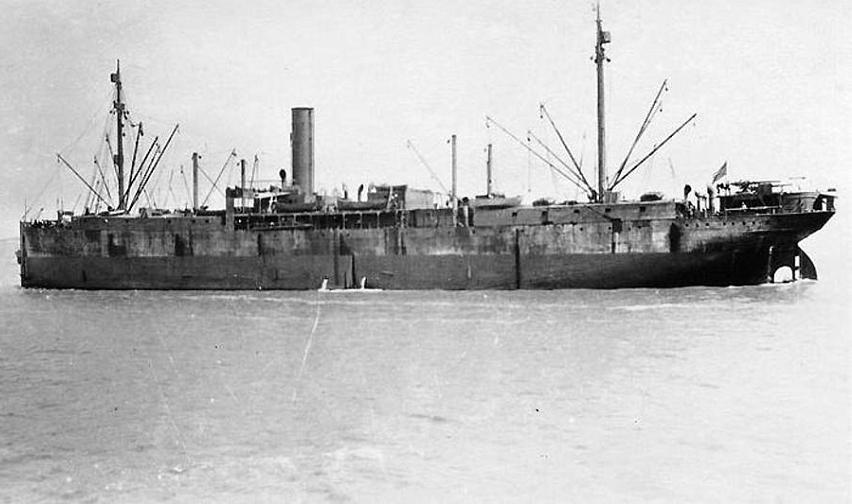
aboard Northern Pacific troopship. Montanan shown
1918–1919

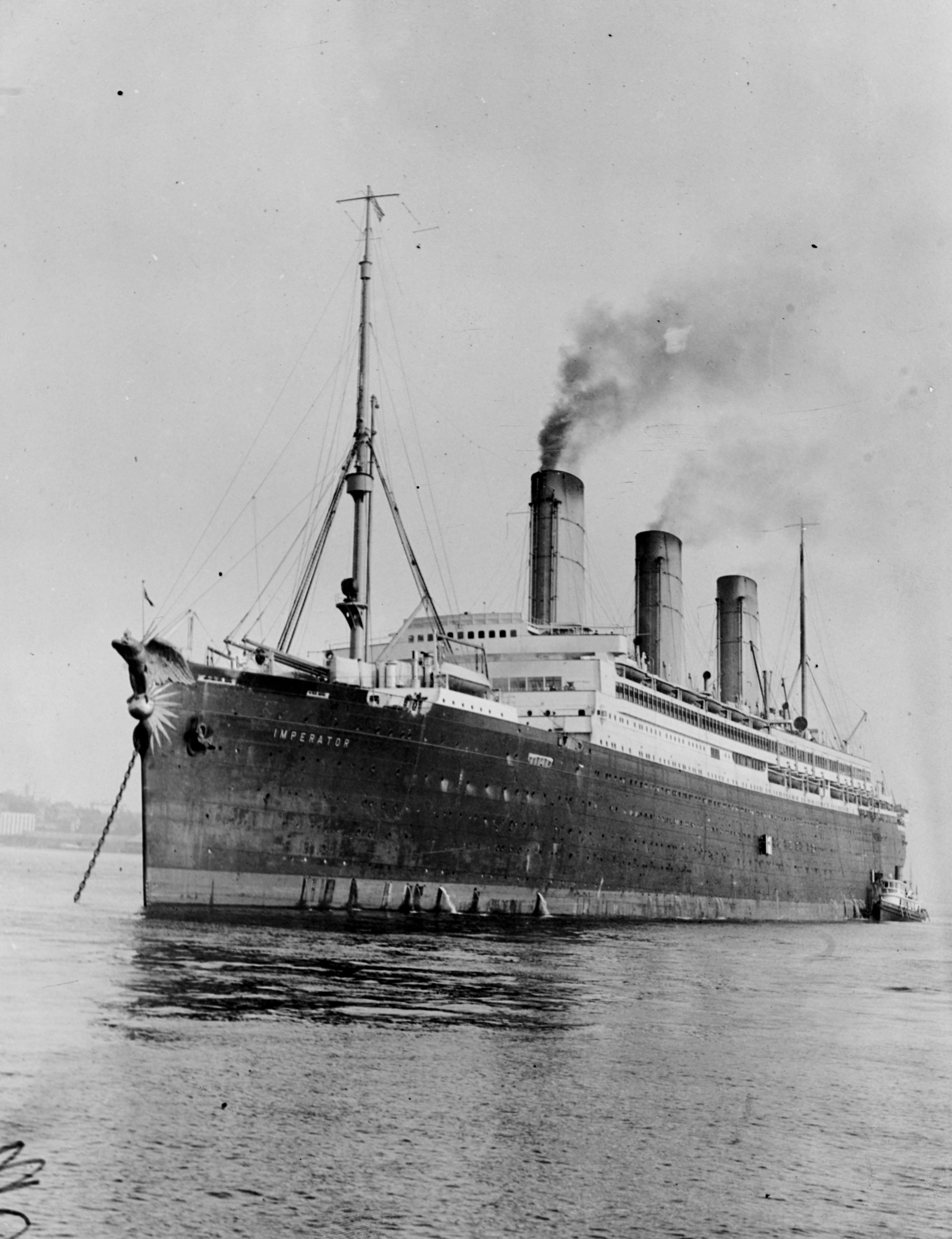
aboard Pretoria – German built, returning troops home. USS Imperator shown. 1919

As a part of the new full-time staff in the First Naval District, Boston, in 1918, Deyo taught destroyer seamanship. He was assigned the year after Rear Admiral Albert Gleaves, then Commander, Destroyer Force, Atlantic Fleet, became Commander of United States Convoy Operations in the Atlantic in addition to his other duties. He was next transferred to the troopship Northern Pacific as a part of its regular USN officer complement. World War I's movement of a million men and their supplies was unprecedented. The crews of harbor and pilot boats, inshore scouts and patrol craft, new merchantmen, escorting vessels, all required training. In the First Naval District, Deyo was a part of the destroyer piece.

== Interwar ==
=== 1920s Pacific ===
Deyo was attached to Admiral Samuel Robison's personal staff of ten officers aboard the USS Seattle in 1925–1926. Now a lieutenant commander, Deyo was the most junior officer as flag lieutenant. The next rung up the ladder was the Assistant Chief of Staff, then Commander Chester W. Nimitz.

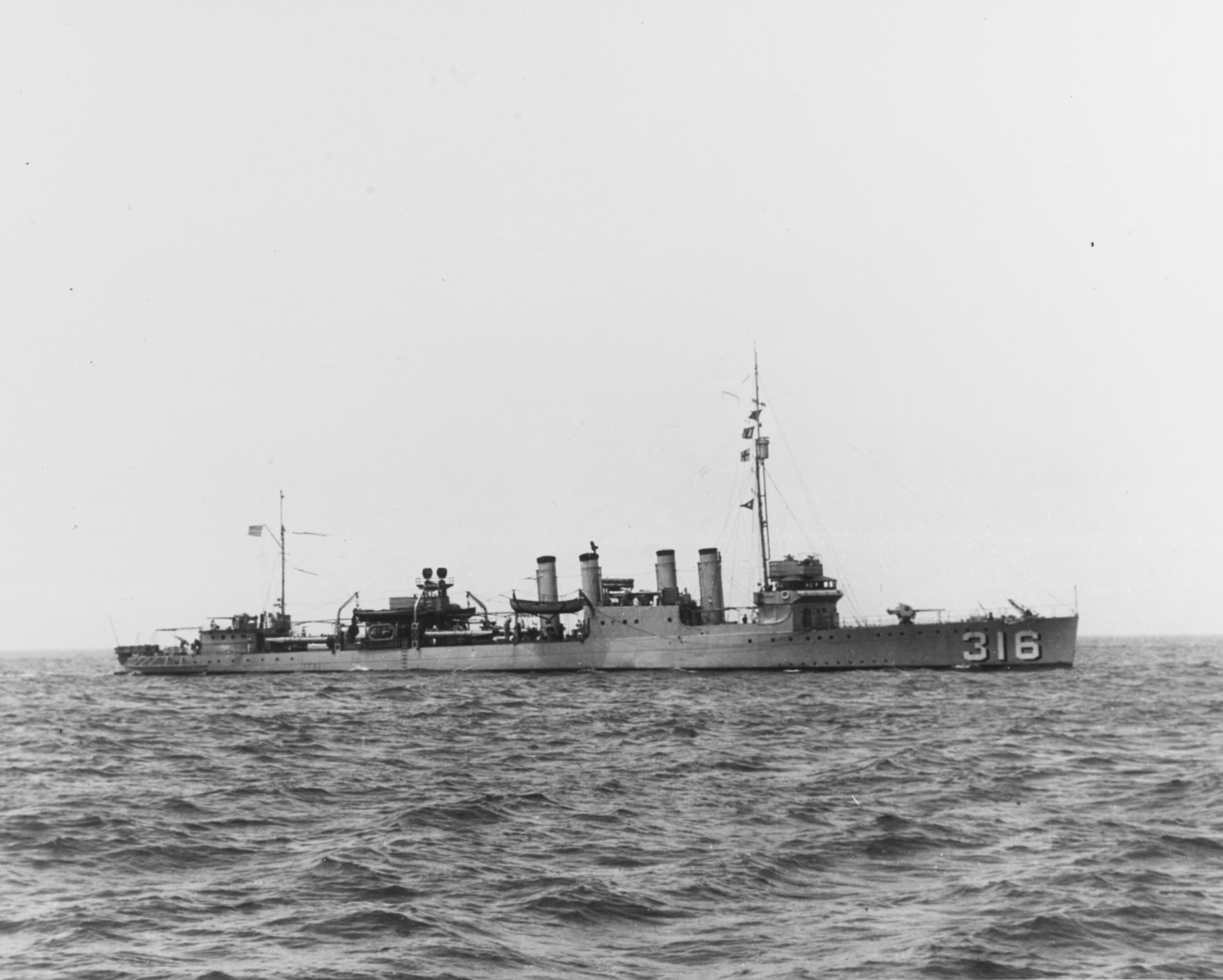
Morris (DD-271)
Clemson-class pictured
Commanding, 1919–1920

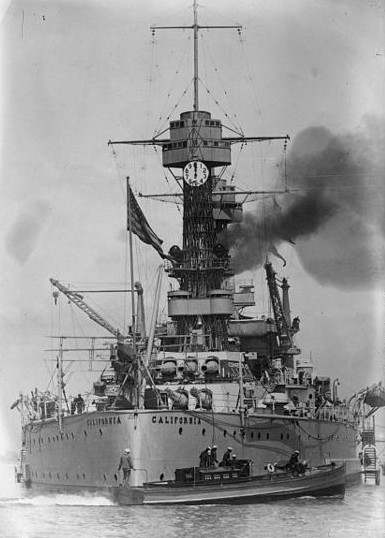
California (BB-44) Tennessee-class battleship
staff, flagship, Battleship Fleet
1923–1925

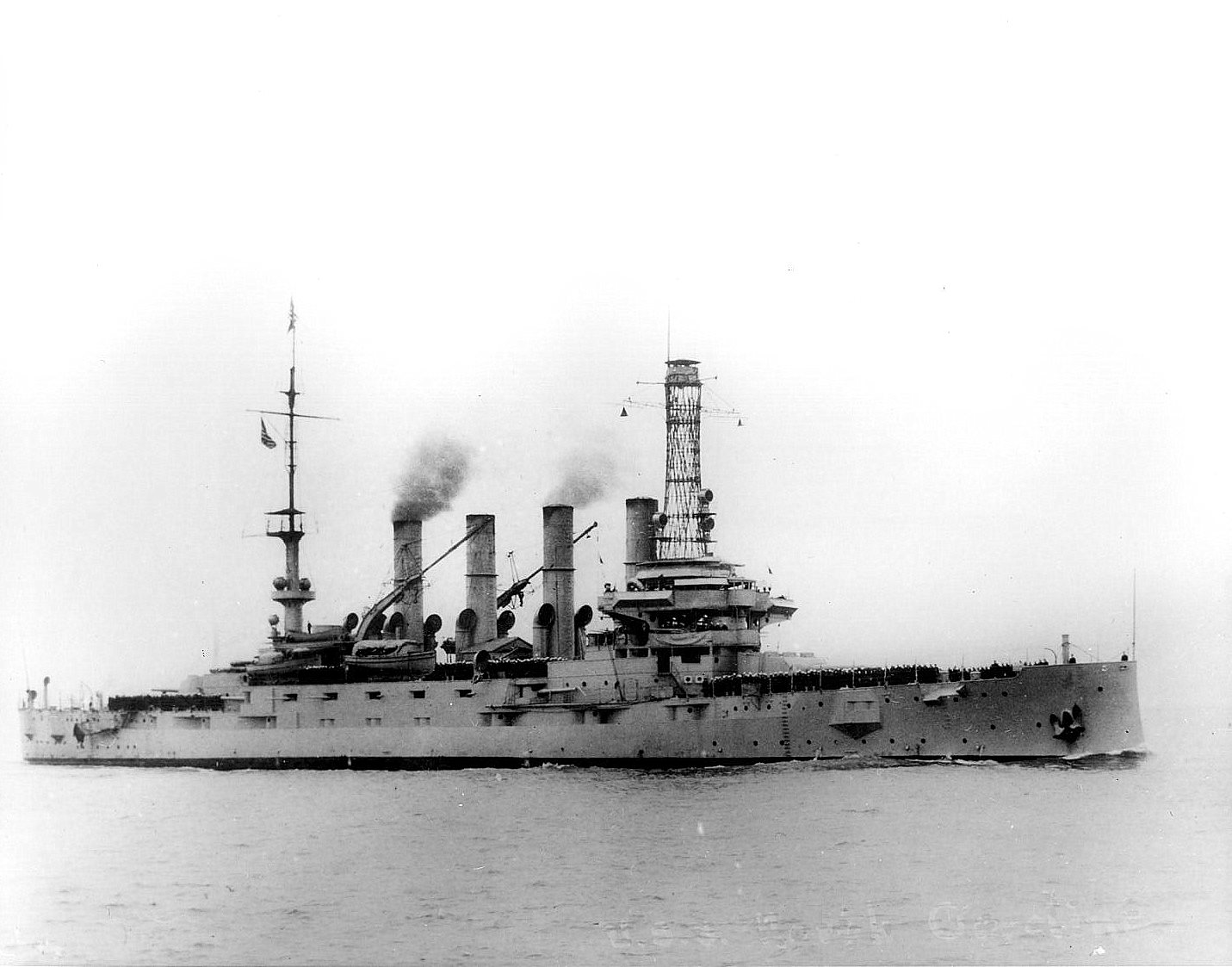
Seattle (CA-11) Tennessee-class cruiser (pic),
flagship, U.S. Fleet, 1925–1926

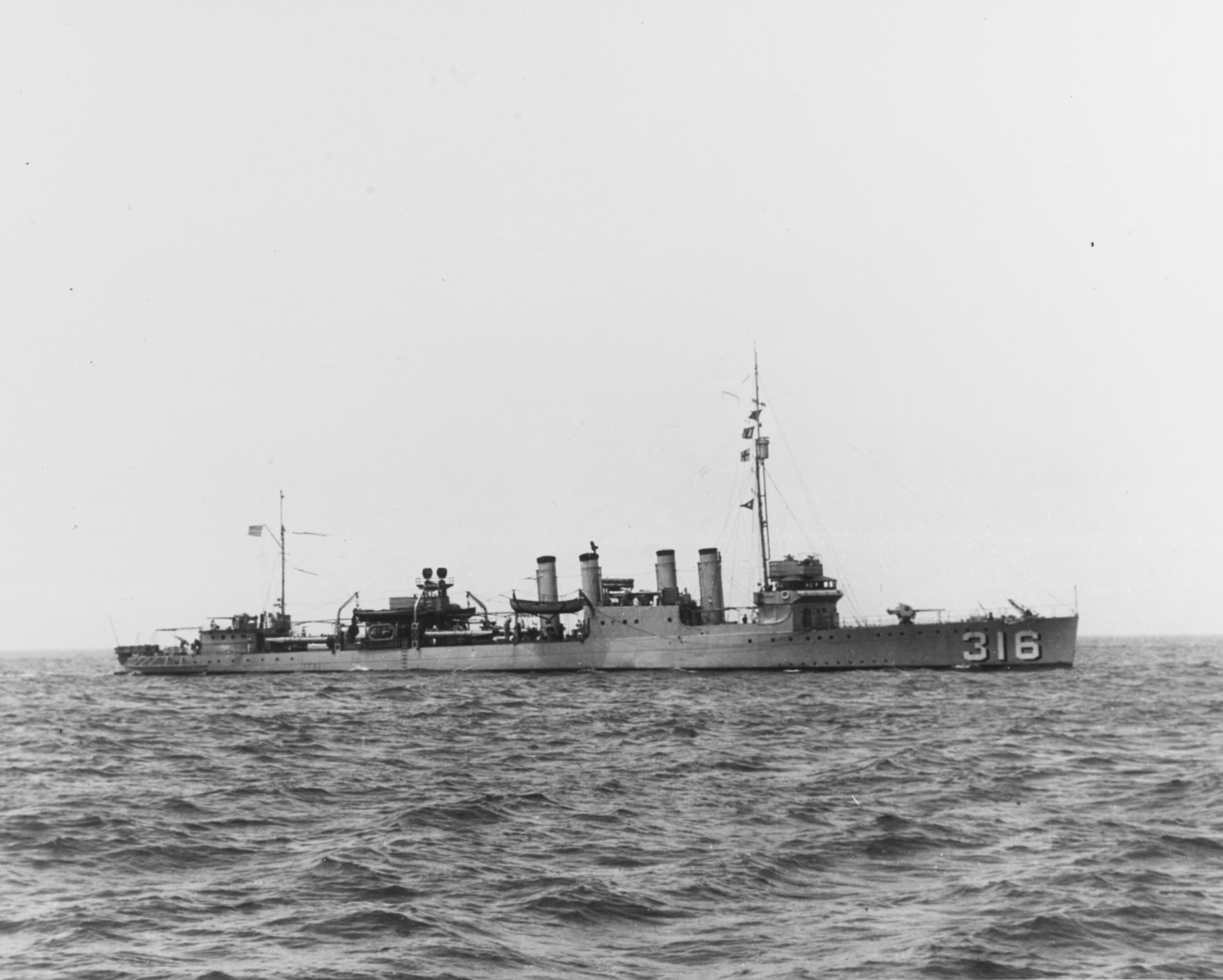
Sloat (DD-316) Clemson-class
Commanding Officer (CO)
1929–1930

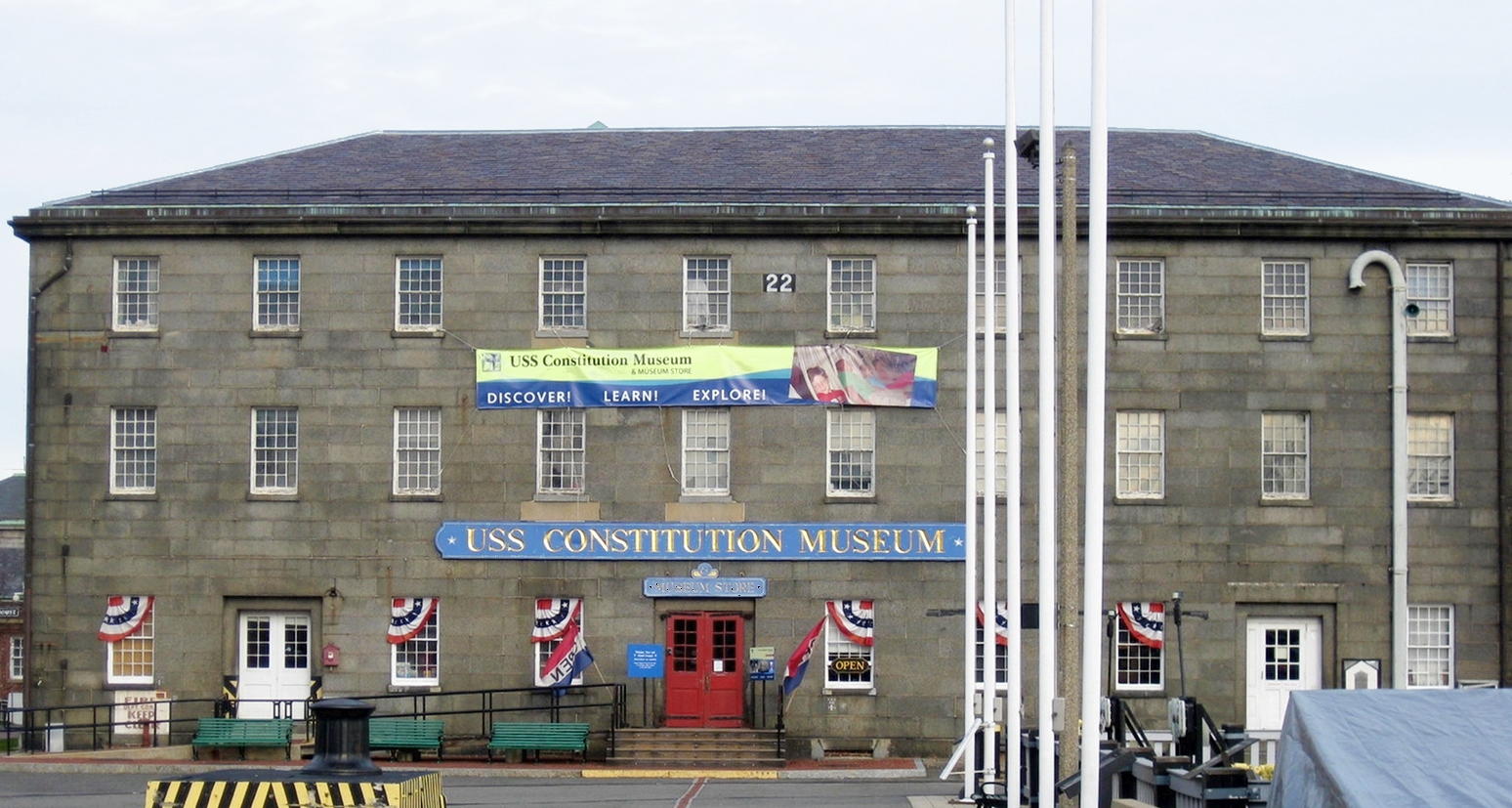
First Naval District, Instructor, destroyer seamanship, 1918

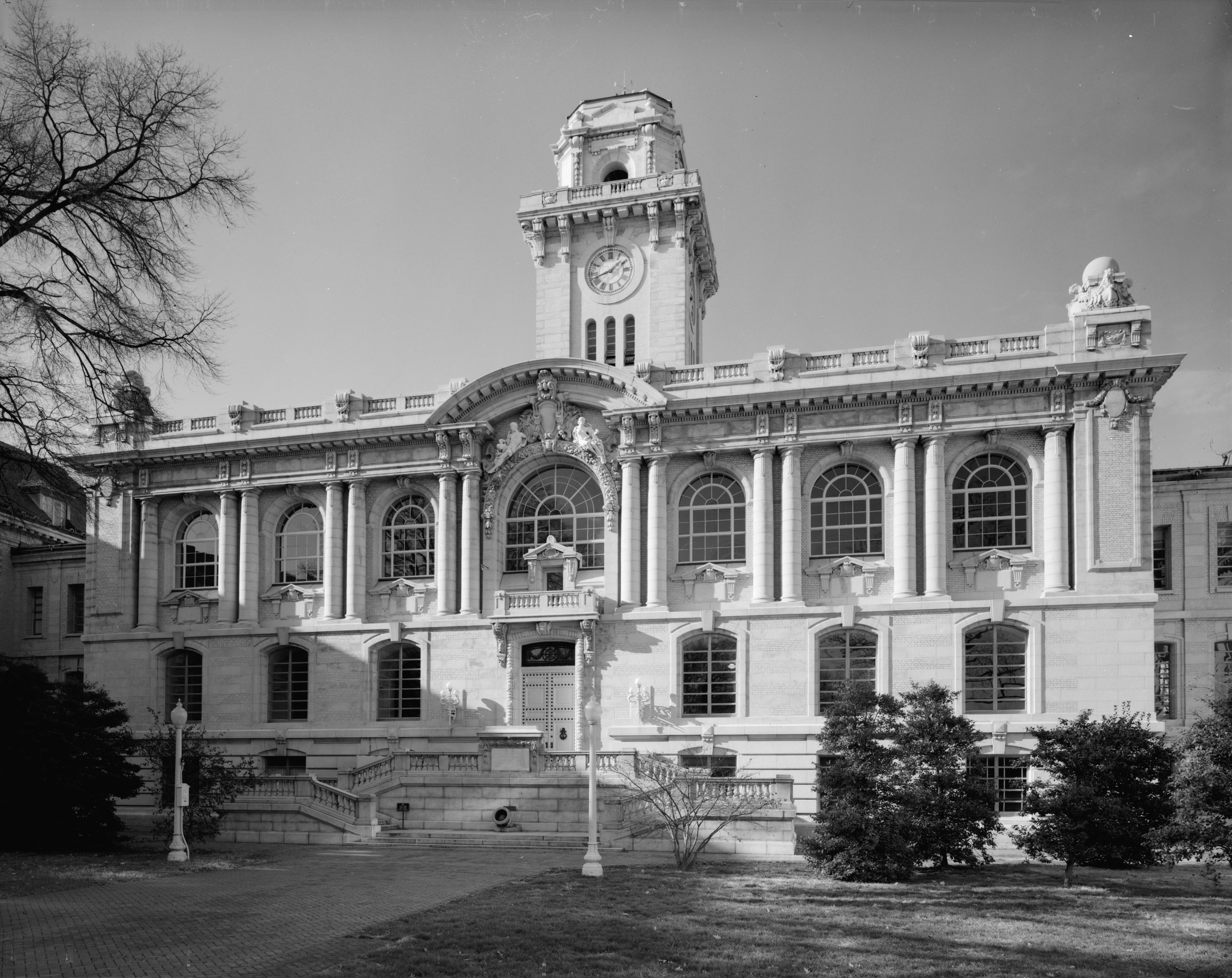
Naval Academy, Mahan Hall seamanship instructor 1926–1929

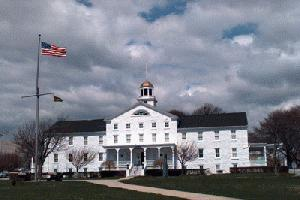
Naval War College, Newport, RI
student; instructor 1931–1934

Following early armored cruiser service in the Caribbean, World War I destroyer service operating in the North Atlantic, and cruiser service crossing the Pacific, Deyo was assigned to a three-year tour teaching seamanship at the Naval Academy, 1926–1929. He was appointed during the tenure of Superintendent Rear Admiral Louis M. Nulton and completed his tour under Rear Admiral Samuel S. Robison with whom he had served in the Dominican Republic. He returned to sea to take command of the destroyer USS Sloat.

His exemplary promise as a commander at sea resulted in an appointment to the Naval War College staff immediately following his study there. He then returned to sea in 1934 as the executive officer aboard the light cruiser USS Milwaukee.

=== 1930s Pacific ===
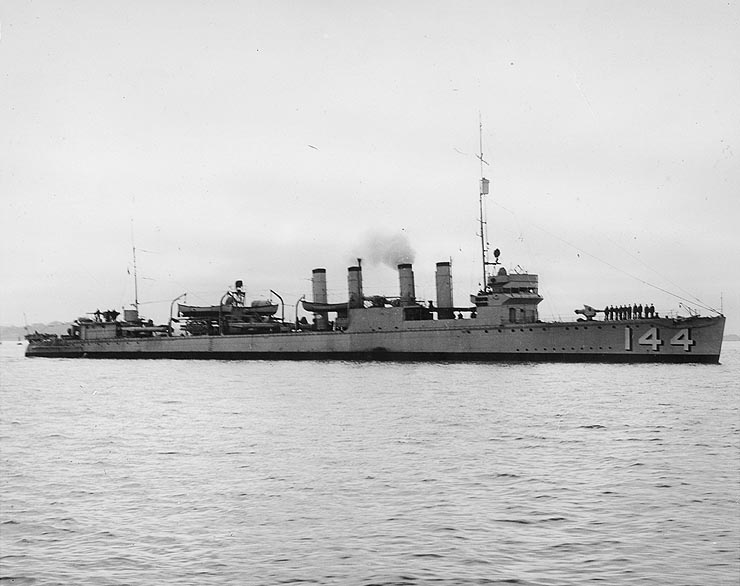
USS Upshur (DD-144)
Commanding Officer (CO)
1930–31

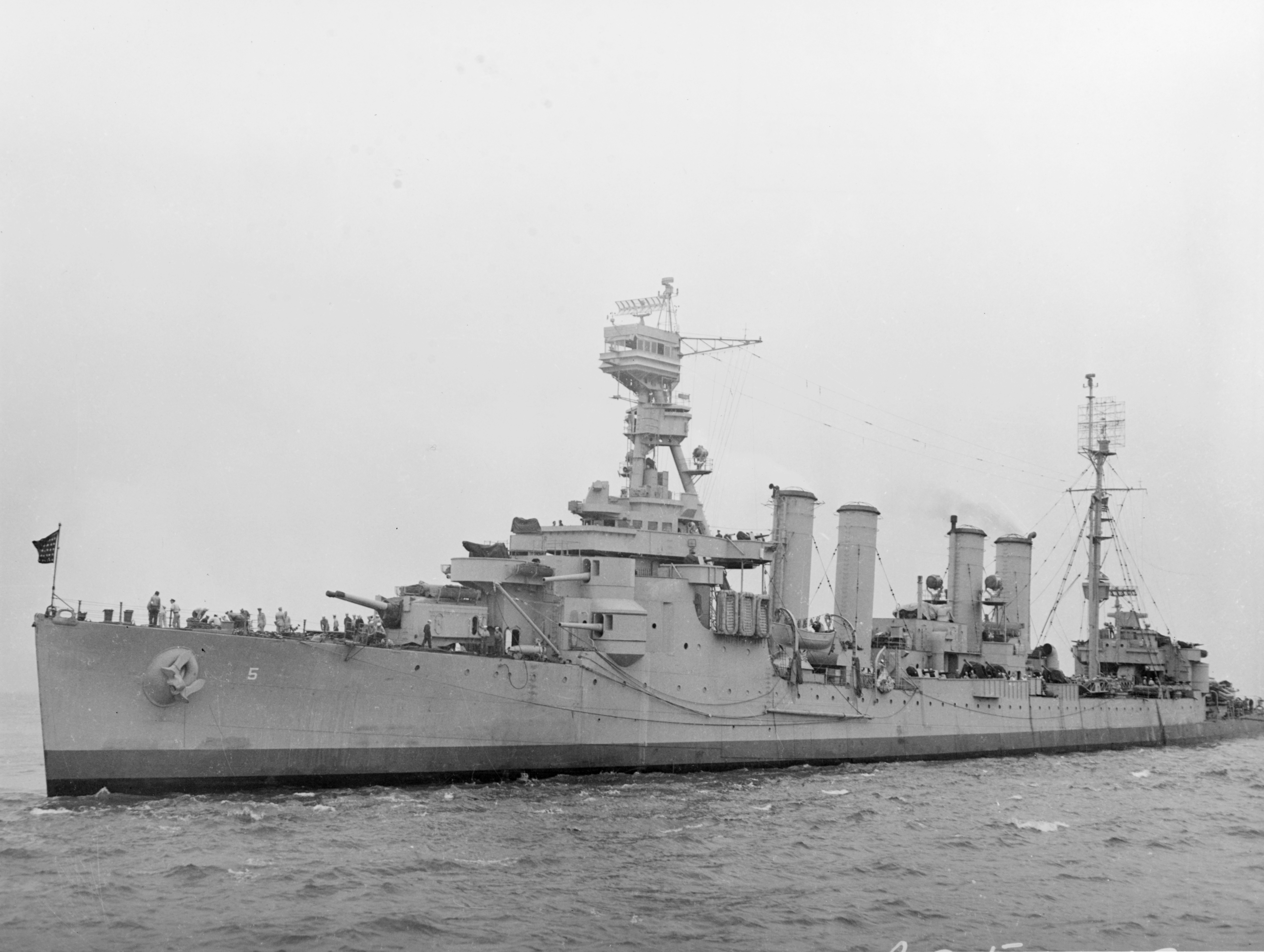
USS Milwaukee (CL-5)
Executive Officer (XO)
1934–36

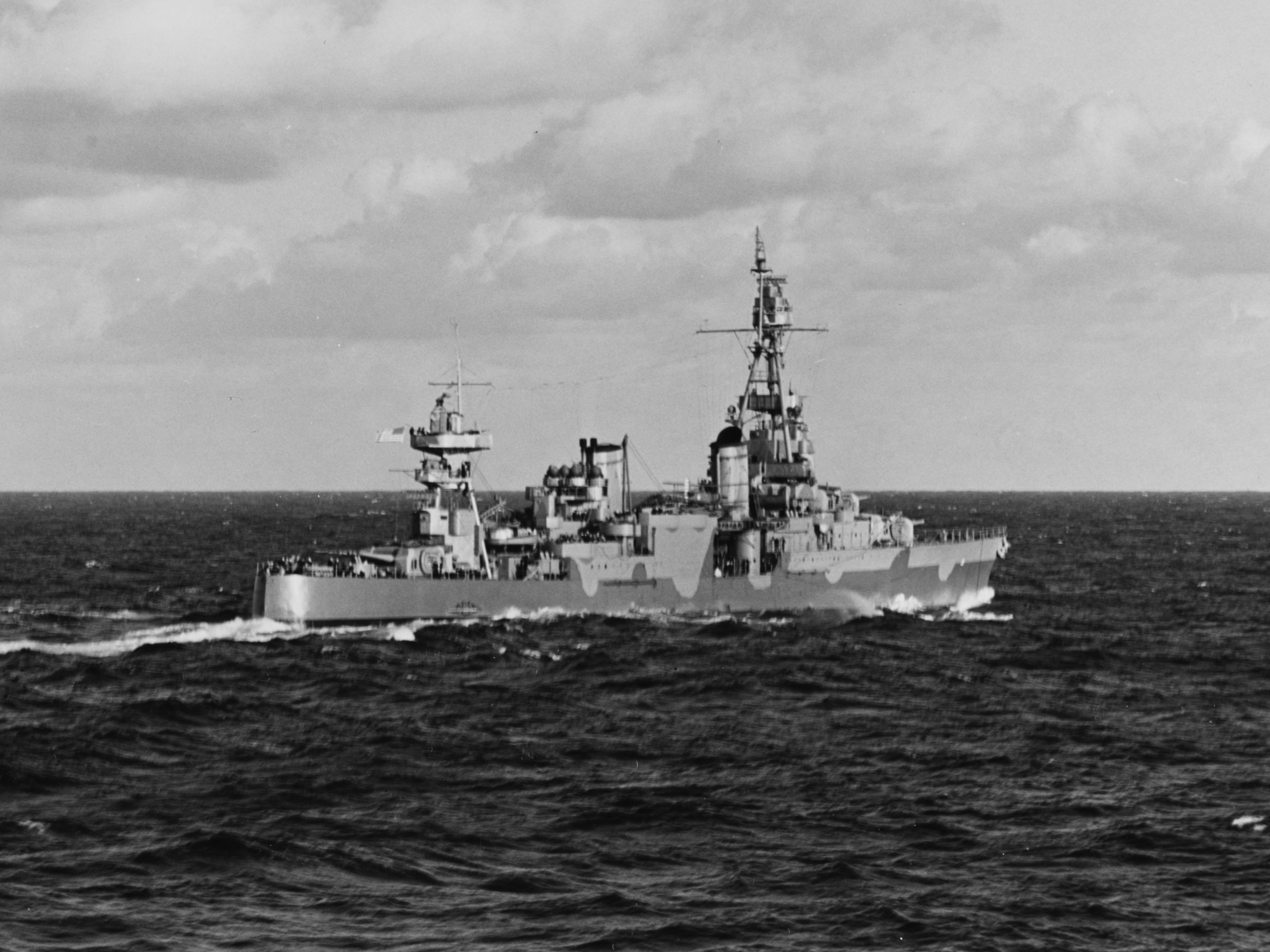
Augusta (CA-31) Northampton-class; flag, Asiatic Squadron,
ops and war plans, 1936–1939

== World War II in the Atlantic ==
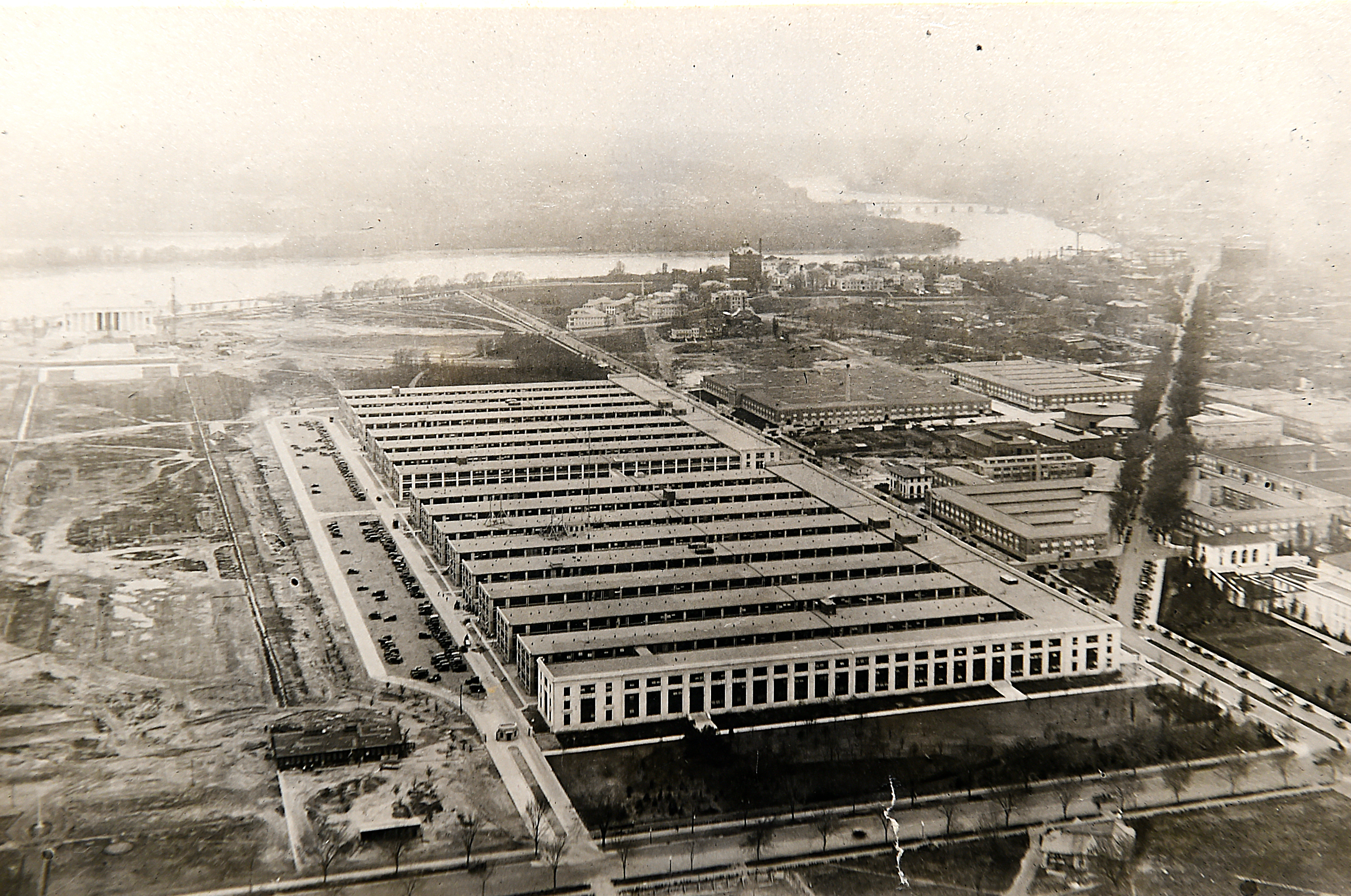
"Main Navy", The Mall
Washington DC 1939–1941

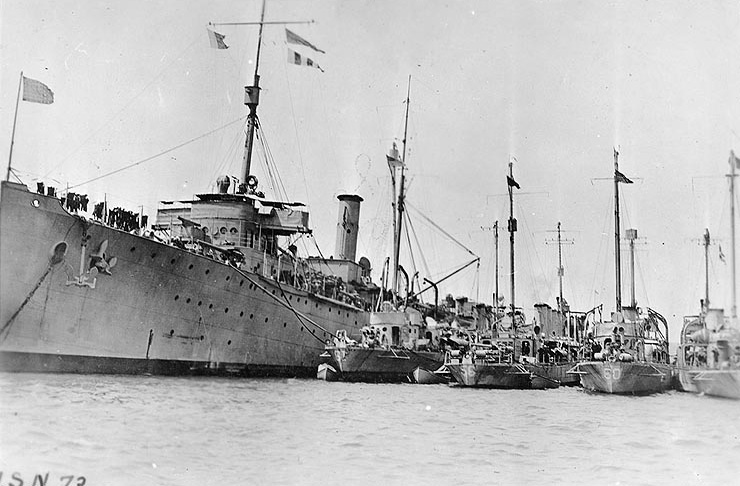
Ericsson (DD-56) (Flag)
Squadron 11 (third fm r.)

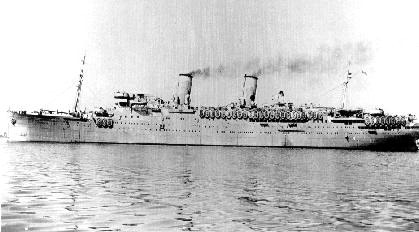
USS Monticello
CO, auxiliary transport 1942

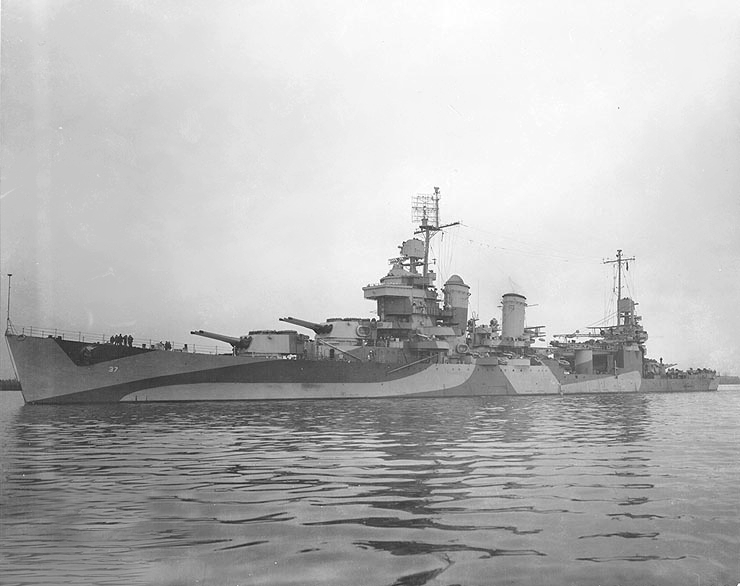
Tuscaloosa (CA-37) (flag)
Force "U", TF-129

With accumulating experience in escort service in the Atlantic, fleet staff service crossing the Pacific, and Asiatic Squadron staff duty for operations and war plans during Japanese expansion, Deyo was prepared for Main Navy assignments from 1939 to 1941 as the Navy's assistant hydrographer, then aide to the Secretary of the Navy until war sent him to sea again.

Then a captain, Deyo was escort commander of Task Unit 4.1.1 and the Commodore of Destroyer Squadron 11. His group was tasked to escort 44 merchant ships ranging from a luxury liner to a rusty ship of the Levant. His pennant USS Ericsson and the Eberle were the only modern destroyers in the group. The others were "four-pipers" with "outmoded equipment and low fuel capacity" including the ships of two other squadron commanders. Canadian escorts protected the convoy for the first 350 miles, then the Americans until point "Momp" when the British escorted ships to Britain. Deyo then proceeded with the American destroyers to Iceland with three American merchantmen and one Icelandic.

There was no submarine attack, but the Navy destroyers were inexperienced in their seamanship. They progressed from patrolling only on calm moonlit nights within 1,000 yards of the convoy and staying on station if there was fog, to patrolling 5,000 yards out whatever the sea condition or visibility. U-boat searches were extended to over an hour at a time. Still there was extra work to escorting this convoy. Stragglers, breakdowns and laggards created a ragged formation which was difficult to cordon. The convoy could not sit in the water, so it made numerous course changes to buy time for at-sea overhaul of those falling behind. Nevertheless, when the Nigaristan sank in high winds and rolling seas, the Eberle rescued the entire 63-man crew. On return to the U.S., "Captain Deyo made a number of adversely critical comments in his report" relative to the demands of anti-submarine warfare, "leadership, seamanship and marksmanship."

On 6 June 1944, now Rear Admiral Deyo commanded the western Operation Neptune Force "U", supporting the landing of the American First Army at Utah and Omaha beaches during the Normandy landings.

Deyo served as Commander, Task Force 129 (CTF 129) during the bombardment of Cherbourg, and supported General J. Lawton Collins's Army VII Corps in taking Cherbourg, France. The American and British ships dueled port-city shore batteries and surrounding German defenses. The battleship USS Texas and destroyers Barton, Laffey, and O'Brien were all damaged by enemy fire.

Deyo commanded the naval bombardment for the invasion of Southern France in August 1944 and received Legion of Honour, Officer by the Government of France.

== World War II in the Pacific ==
Admiral Deyo's crowning achievement in the Pacific was command of gunfire and covering force for the assault and occupation of Okinawa. It was for service off Okinawa that he was awarded the Navy Distinguished Service Medal.

Rear Admiral Deyo took over Cruiser Division 13 (CruDiv 13) from Rear Admiral Laurance T. DuBose. The Division consisted of four light cruisers: USS Biloxi, Birmingham, Mobile, and Santa Fe.

From 24 March to 4 May 1945, Task Force 54 under the command of Rear Adm. Deyo commanded battleships, cruisers and destroyers in the bombardment of Kerama Retto and the southeast coast of Okinawa, Japan. Following the war, he directed the landing of occupation forces in Northern Japan.

== Post-war and later life ==
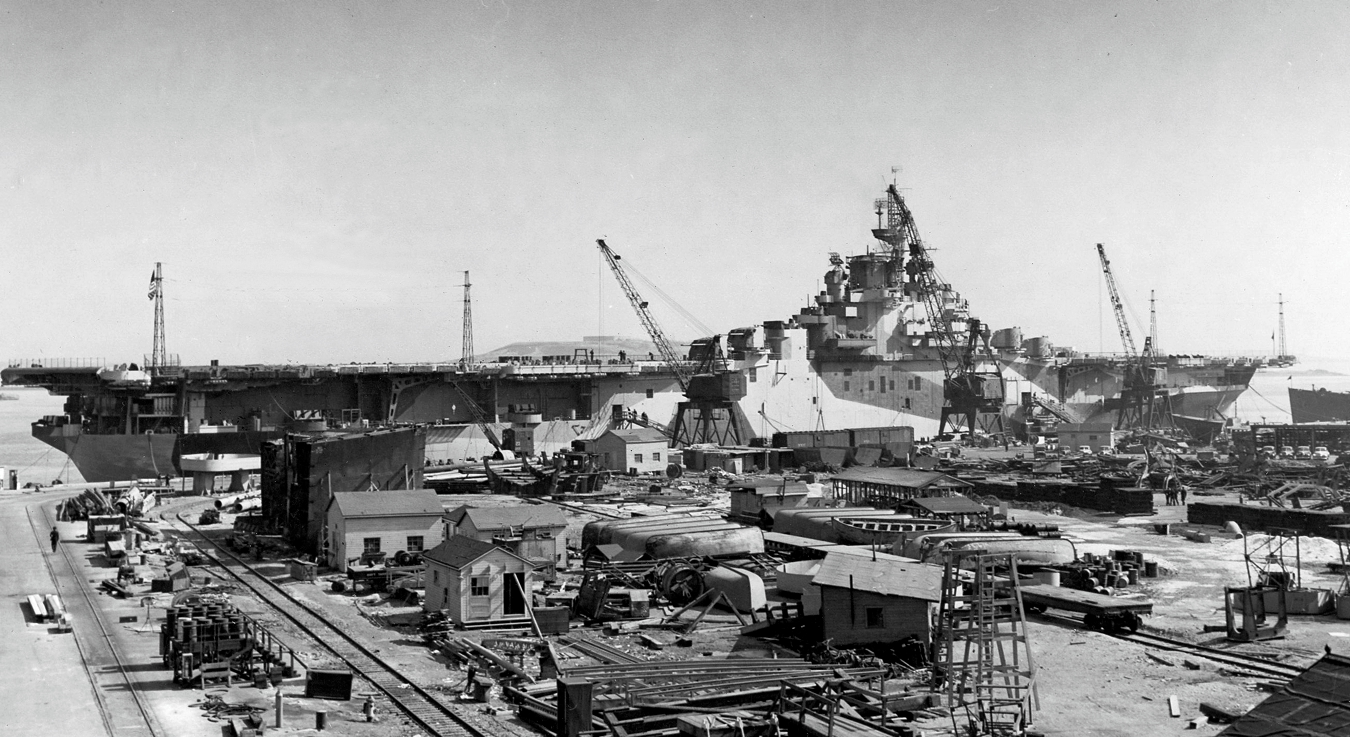
Commandant, First Naval District, 1946–49

Morton Deyo's last duty station, from 1946 to 1949, was as Commandant of the First Naval District, headquartered at the Boston Navy Yard. The First Naval District exercised administrative supervision of all Navy activities in the New England states, except for Connecticut.

Working out inter-service and inter-department conflicts was a serious goal for the U.S. Navy going into the Cold War. As of September 1945, the qualifications for a district commandant were those of a line officer eligible for command at sea, and the shipyard (specialist) commands were no longer to be held by the same officer. Deyo met the new qualification for district commandant, and had served at Boston twice before as an instructor and aide to the commandant during a time of reorganization. Inefficiency from command conflicts were taken under study even before the war ended by the "Farber Committee".

The main feature of reform related to the various types of authority over district activities. The commandant was to have coordinating "military command" over all activities in the district akin to Army districts. The Navy Secretary directed satisfactory relationships. With a background of local relationships, technical expertise, leadership and diplomatic skills, Morton Deyo was the man chosen to make it happen.

He retired at the end of his tour with a promotion to vice admiral. In retirement he lived at Hooke's Cove in Kittery Point, Maine. In 1959 he was elected as an honorary member of the New Hampshire Society of the Cincinnati.

Admiral Deyo died November 10, 1973, at his home in Kittery Point, Maine.

== Namesake ==
The destroyer USS Deyo (DD-989) was the 27th Spruance-class destroyer and the first ship to be named to honor Vice Admiral Deyo. She was commissioned on March 22, 1980. The Deyo was last home-ported in Norfolk, Virginia. Stricken from the Navy list on April 6, 2003, she was sunk as a target on August 25, 2005, in the Atlantic.

== Biographical timeline ==
Milestones

1887, July 1 Born, Poughkeepsie, N.Y.

1916 Married Maria Ten Eyck Decatur Mayo

1949 Retired from navy as vice admiral

1973, Nov. 10 Died, Portsmouth, N.H.

Early service

1911 Graduated, United States Naval Academy

1911–1913 Served on Virginia (Battleship)

1913–1914 Served on Duncan (Destroyer)

1914–1915 Served on Washington (Heavy cruiser)

1915–1916 Served on Jenkins (Destroyer)

1916–1918 Served on Allen (Destroyer), Ireland, "Sims' Destroyers"

1918 Trained destroyer crews, First Naval District, Boston, Mass.

1918–1919 Served on Northern Pacific, troop transport, Europe to U.S.

1919 Served on Pretoria (German ship taken over as transport)

Interwar

1919–1920 Commanding Morris (Destroyer), Adriatic, Mediterranean

1920–1921 Aide to commandant, First Naval District, Boston, Mass.

1921–1923 Aide to military governor, Santo Domingo

1923–1925 Staff, Battleship Fleet, California (Flagship)

1925–1926 Staff, U.S. Fleet, Seattle (Flagship)

1926–1929 Instructor in seamanship, U.S. Naval Academy

1929–1930 Commanding Sloat (Destroyer)

1930–1931 Commanding Upshur (Destroyer)

1931–1934 Student, staff, Naval War College, Newport, RI

1934–1936 Executive officer, Milwaukee (Light cruiser)

Pre-war

1936–1939 Operations and war plans, staff, U.S. Asiatic Fleet, Augusta (Flag)

1939–1940 Assistant hydrographer, Navy Department, Washington DC

1940–1941 Aide to Secretary of the Navy, Washington DC

Atlantic

1941 Commanding Destroyer Squadron II, Atlantic, first convoy to Iceland

1942 Commanding Monticello (Auxiliary transport)

1942 Commanding Indianapolis (Heavy cruiser), Aleutians bombardment

1942–1943 Commanding destroyers, Atlantic Fleet

1944 Commanding Ranger Task Group Atlantic

1944 Commanded bombardment, Normandy and southern France, Atlantic

Pacific

1944 Commanded Cruiser Division 13, Task Forces in 3rd and 5th Fleets, Pacific

1945 Commanded Task Force 54, Okinawa campaign, Pacific

Post-war

1945 Commanded Task Forces 55 and 56, surrender, occupation of Japan

1946–1949 Commandant, First Naval District, Boston, Mass.

November 10, 1973, Admiral Deyo dies in Kittery Point, Maine
