= USS Commodore Morris =

Gunboat of the United States Navy

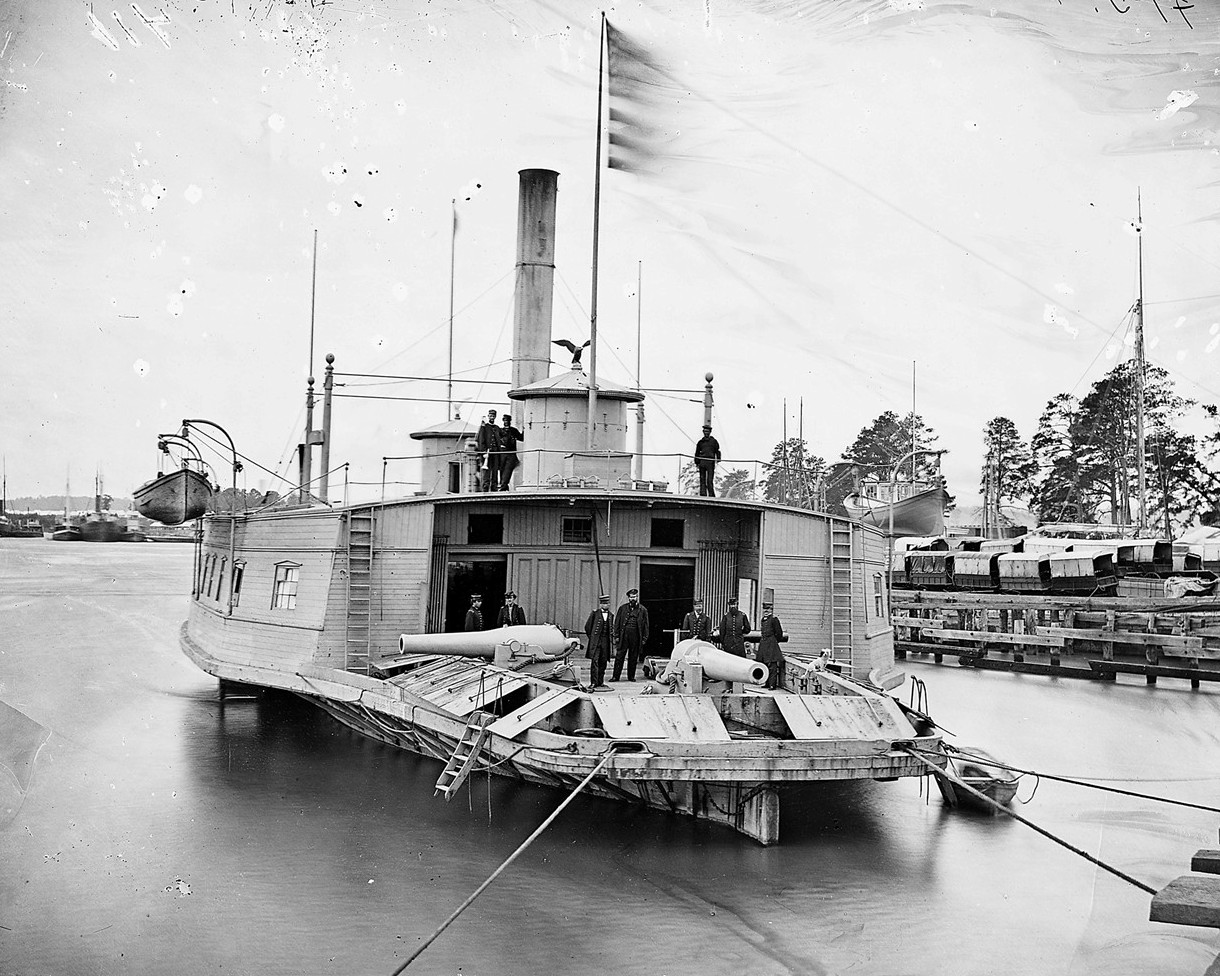
- Commodore Morris, on the Pamunkey River, Virginia in 1864–1865

History

United States
- Name: USS Commodore Morris
- Laid down: date unknown
- Launched: 1862
- Acquired: 5 August 1862
- Commissioned: 19 November 1862
- Decommissioned: 24 June 1865
- Stricken: est. 1865
- Fate: Sold, 12 July 1865

General characteristics
- Type: Gunboat
- Displacement: 532 long tons (541 t)
- Length: 154 ft (47 m) (estimated)
- Beam: 32 ft 6 in (9.91 m) (estimated)
- Draft: 8 ft 6 in (2.59 m)
- Propulsion: Steam engine; side-wheel propelled
- Speed: 7 kn (8.1 mph; 13 km/h)
- Complement: 106
- Armament: 1 × 100-pounder rifle, 1 × 9 in (230 mm) smoothbore gun, 4 × 24-pounder howitzers

USS Commodore Morris was a ferryboat acquired by the Union Navy during the American Civil War. Ferryboats were of great value, since – because of their flat bottom and shallow draft – they could navigate streams and shallow waters that other ships could not.

== Service history ==
Commodore Morris – an armed, side-wheel ferryboat – was built in 1862 at New York City; purchased by the Navy on 5 August 1862; fitted out at New York Navy Yard; and commissioned on 19 November 1862. Assigned to the North Atlantic Blockading Squadron, Commodore Morris' entire service was in the rivers and creeks of Virginia. Serving on patrol, and as picket, she also transported troops, dragged for mines, towed disabled ships, and sent parties ashore which took prisoners and food supplies.

In January 1863, she sailed up the Pamunkey River in a joint Army-Navy expedition which destroyed a railroad bridge and burned a ferryboat, as well as taking a small steamer. In her patrols from 20 January–April 1863 she took prize a sloop and 65 oyster boats. Several times she engaged Confederate installations and cavalry ashore, most notably in the action with batteries at Trent's Reach on 16 May 1864 and near Malvern Hill on 14 and 16 July.

Commodore Morris arrived at New York on 17 June 1865. There she was decommissioned on 24 June, and sold on 12 July.
