= USS Deyo =

Spruance-class destroyer

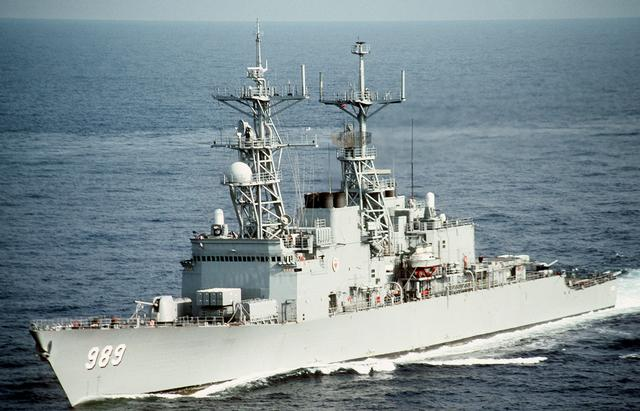
- USS Deyo underway 10 December 1991

History

United States
- Name: Deyo
- Namesake: Morton L. Deyo
- Ordered: 15 January 1975
- Builder: Ingalls Shipbuilding
- Laid down: 14 October 1977
- Launched: 20 January 1979
- Acquired: 25 February 1980
- Commissioned: 22 March 1980
- Decommissioned: 6 November 2003
- Stricken: 6 April 2004
- Identification: Callsign: NEWZ; Hull number: DD-989
- Motto: Brave and Proud
- Fate: Sunk as target, 25 August 2005
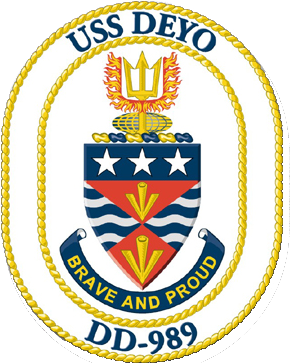
- Badge

General characteristics
- Class & type: Spruance-class destroyer
- Displacement: 8,040 long tons (8,170 t) full load
- Length: 529 ft (161 m) waterline; 563 ft (172 m) overall
- Beam: 55 ft (17 m)
- Draft: 29 ft (8.8 m)
- Installed power: 3 × 501-K17 generator sets (2,000 kW (2,700 hp) each)
- Propulsion: 4 × General Electric LM2500 gas turbines, 2 shafts, 80,000 shp (60 MW)
- Speed: 32.5 knots (60.2 km/h; 37.4 mph)
- Range: 6,000 nmi (11,000 km; 6,900 mi) at 20 knots (37 km/h; 23 mph)
- Complement: 19 officers, 315 enlisted
- Sensors & processing systems: AN/SPS-40 air search radar; AN/SPG-60 fire control radar; AN/SPS-55 surface search radar; AN/SPQ-9 gun fire control radar; Mark 23 TAS automatic detection and tracking radar; AN/SPS-65 missile fire control radar; AN/SQS-53 bow-mounted active sonar; AN/SQR-19 TACTAS towed array passive sonar; Naval Tactical Data System
- Electronic warfare & decoys: AN/SLQ-32 electronic warfare system; AN/SLQ-25 Nixie torpedo countermeasures; Mark 36 SRBOC decoy launching system; AN/SLQ-49 inflatable decoys
- Armament: 2 × 5 in (127 mm) 54 caliber Mark 45 dual purpose guns; 2 × 20 mm Phalanx CIWS Mark 15 guns; 1 × 8 cell ASROC launcher (removed); 1 × 8 cell NATO Sea Sparrow Mark 29 missile launcher; 2 × quadruple Harpoon missile canisters; 2 × Mark 32 triple 12.75 in (324 mm) torpedo tubes (Mk 46 torpedoes); 1 × 61 cell Mk 41 VLS launcher for Tomahawk missiles
- Aircraft carried: 2 × Sikorsky SH-60 Seahawk LAMPS III helicopters
- Aviation facilities: Flight deck and enclosed hangar for up to two medium-lift helicopters

USS Deyo (DD-989), a Spruance-class destroyer, was a ship of the United States Navy named for Vice Admiral Morton L. Deyo (1887–1973), a veteran destroyerman and distinguished naval gunfire support task force commander of World War II.

Deyo was laid down on 14 October 1977 by Ingalls Shipbuilding, Pascagoula, Miss.; launched on 20 January 1979; and commissioned on 22 March 1980.

== History ==
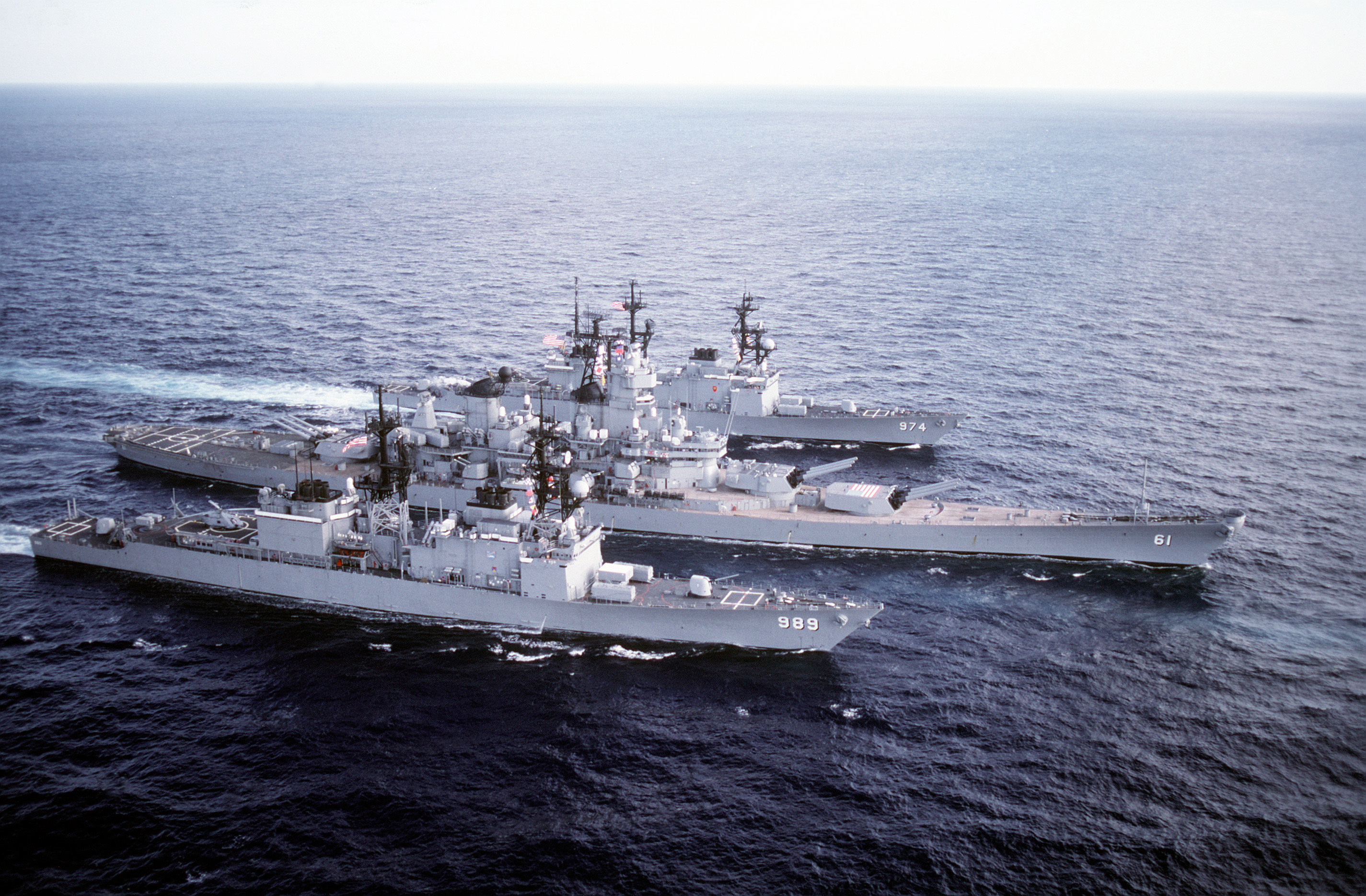
USS Iowa (BB-61), USS Deyo (DD-989), and USS Comte de Grasse (DD-974) as part of the Iowa Battleship Battle Group

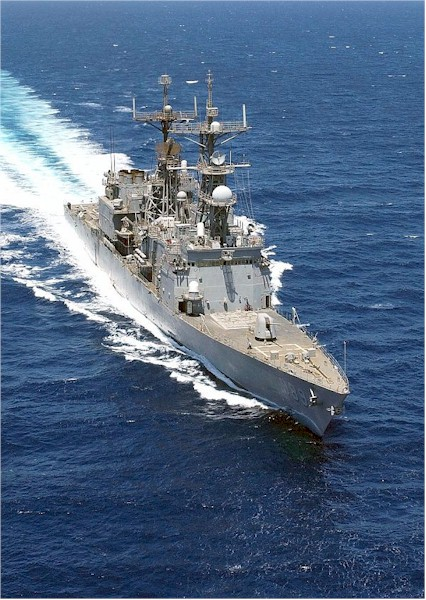
USS Deyo operating in support of Operation Iraqi Freedom on 29 March 2003.

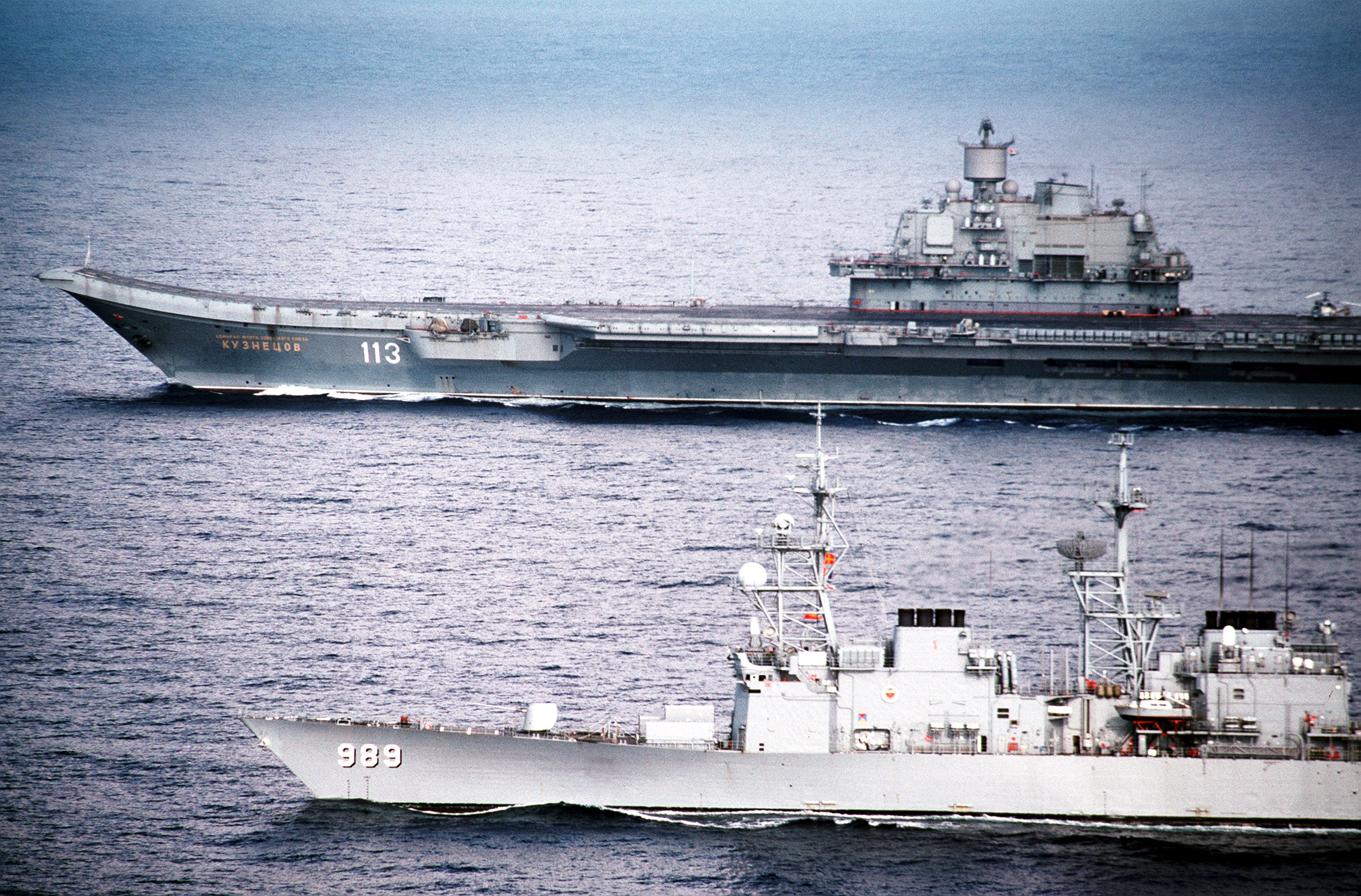
Deyo, foreground, steams off the port side of the Soviet aircraft carrier Admiral Kuznetsov in the waters south of Italy. Admiral Kuznetsov was en route to duty with the Soviet Northern Fleet.

Deyo took part in operations in the Atlantic and Eastern Pacific Oceans, Caribbean and Mediterranean Seas, and the Persian Gulf. The ship first deployed in May 1981, when it was ordered to the Persian Gulf in response to rising tensions in the Middle East.

In July 1987, Deyo deployed to the Mediterranean, North Arabian Sea and the Indian Ocean as part of the Iowa Battleship battle group. The ship returned to the Persian Gulf in July 1989 to support tanker escort duties during Operation Earnest Will.

After completing counter-drug operations in the Caribbean Sea in August 1990, Deyo deployed to the Mediterranean Sea in May 1991 as part of the Forrestal Carrier Battle Group. The ship visited Liverpool, England in 1993, and represented the US during the 50th Anniversary Celebrations of "The Battle of the Atlantic." The destroyer returned to the Mediterranean Sea in 1994 as a member of the George Washington Carrier Battle Group.

In June 1996, Deyo was struck by the Military Sealift Command vehicle cargo ship USNS Gilliland (T-AKR-298) while moored in port at Newport News. A sudden windstorm caused Gilliland to break free of her moorings and cross the harbor, colliding with Deyo and the submarine USS Tucson (SSN-770), moored ahead of Deyo. Deyo suffered the most damage, while Tucson suffered only minor damage.

In June 1998, Deyo again deployed for the Mediterranean Sea, becoming the first American ship to serve as flagship for Standing Naval Force Mediterranean.

During its final deployment in December 2002 with the Harry S Truman Carrier Battle Group, Deyo was one of the first ships to fire Tomahawk cruise missiles on Iraqi targets during Operation Iraqi Freedom.

Deyo is unique for being the only Spruance-class destroyer armed with armored box launchers that were later upgraded to the Mk 41 VLS.

=== Fate ===
Deyo was decommissioned on 6 November 2003 at NS Norfolk, Virginia. She was stricken from the Navy list on 6 April 2004, and was sunk as a target in a fleet training exercise, 25 August 2005.

== Gallery ==
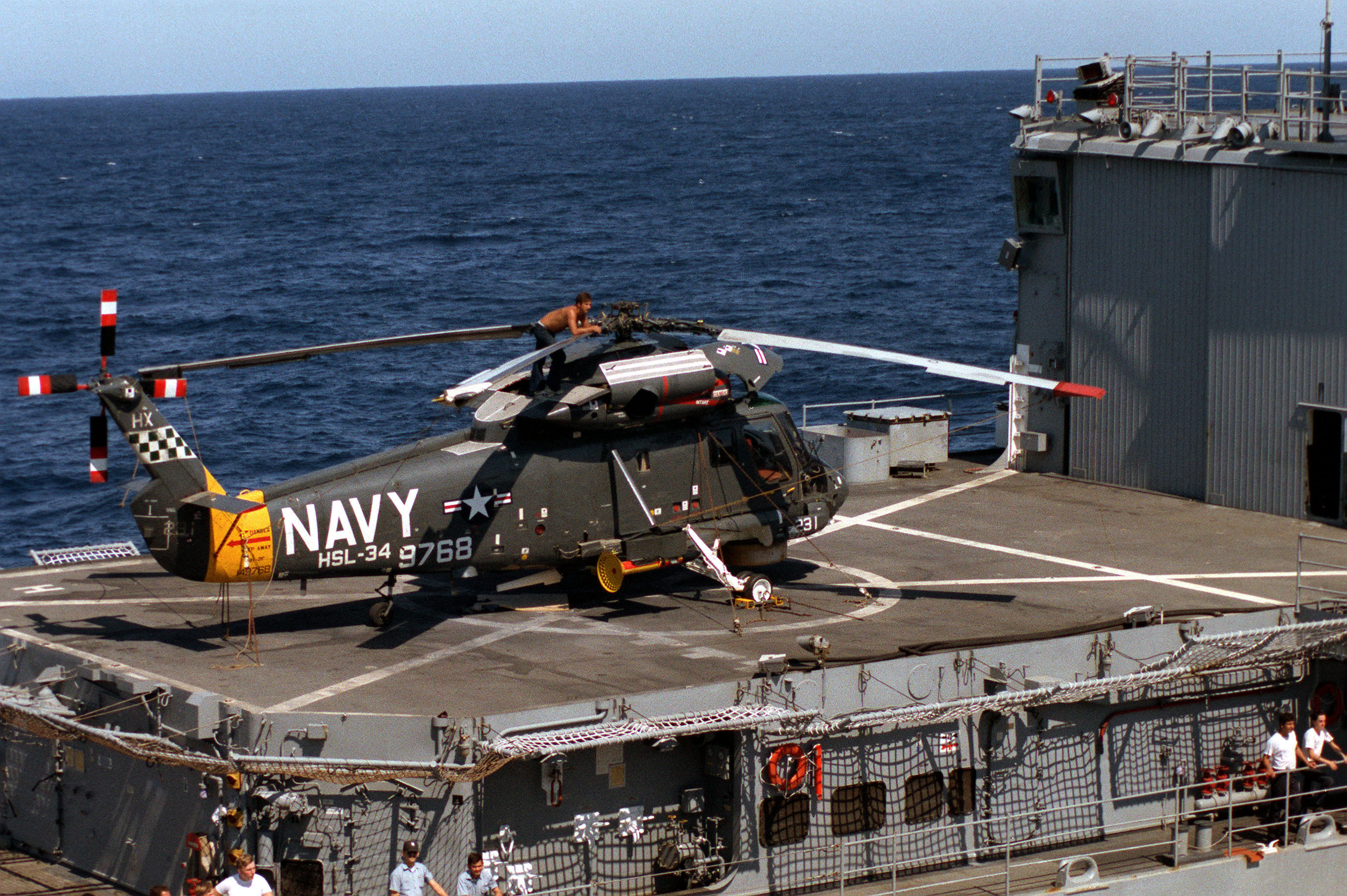
USS Deyo's SH-2F Seasprite in 1982

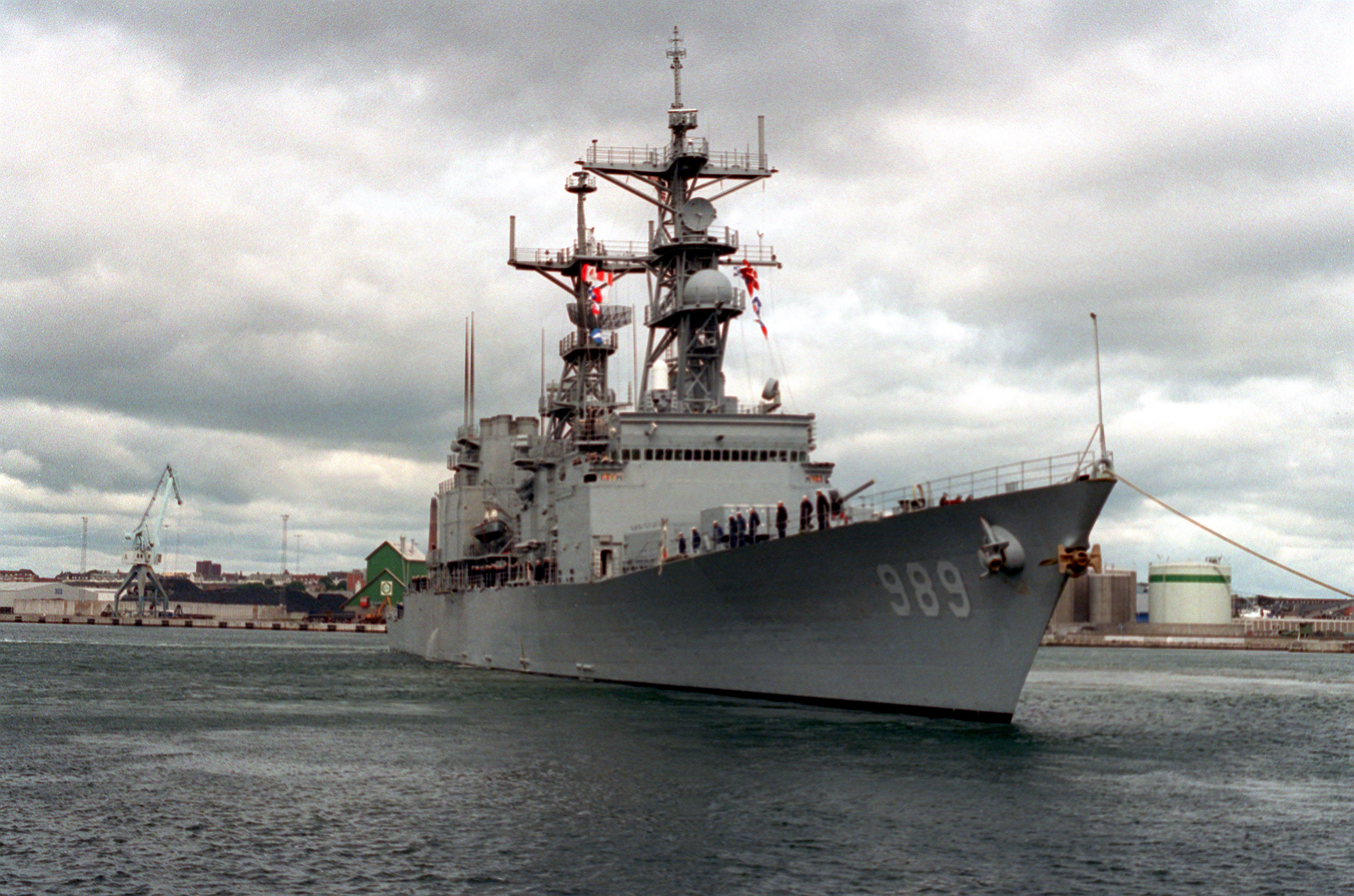
USS Deyo on 1 June 1993

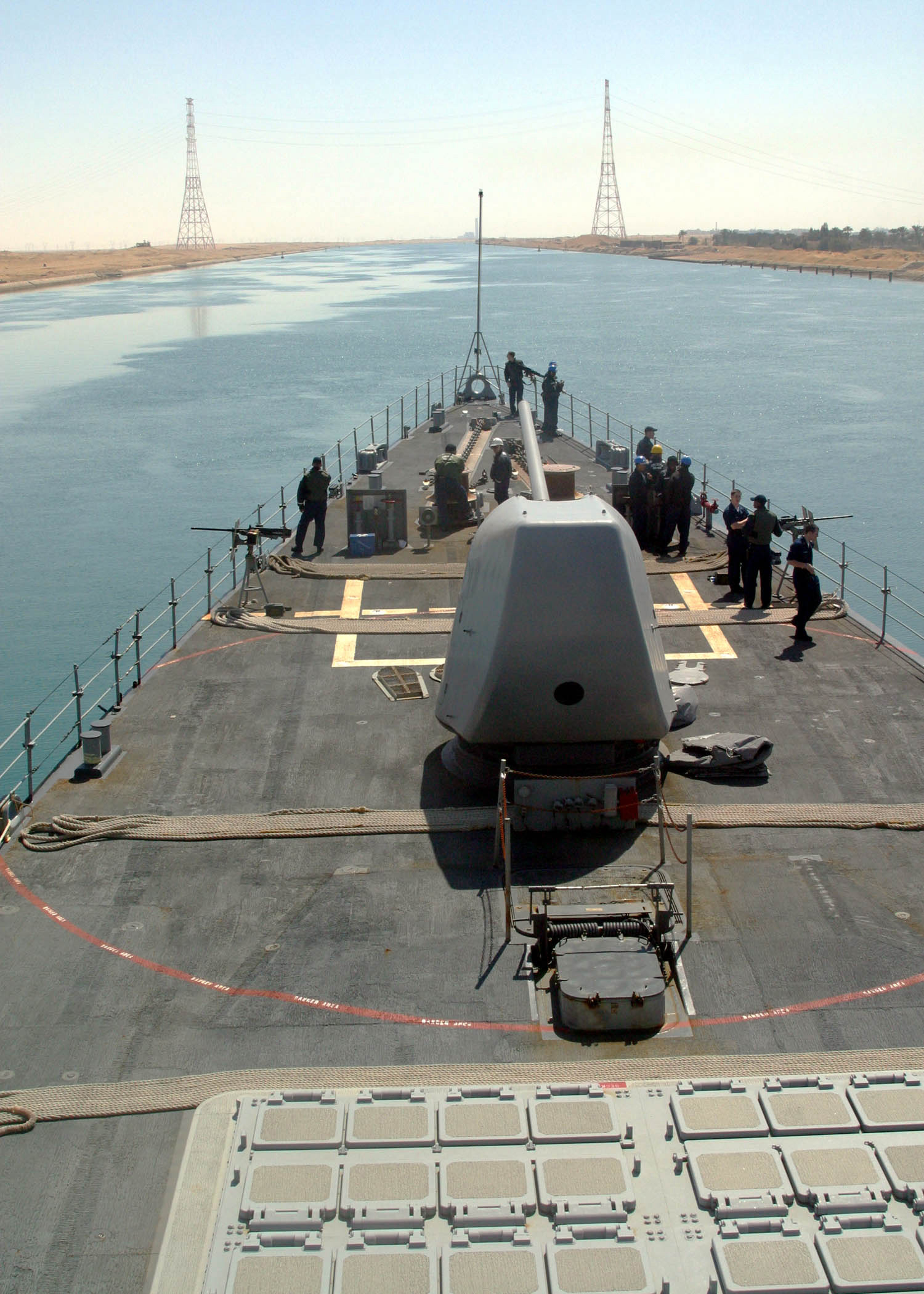
USS Deyo transits the Suez Canal on 14 March 2003

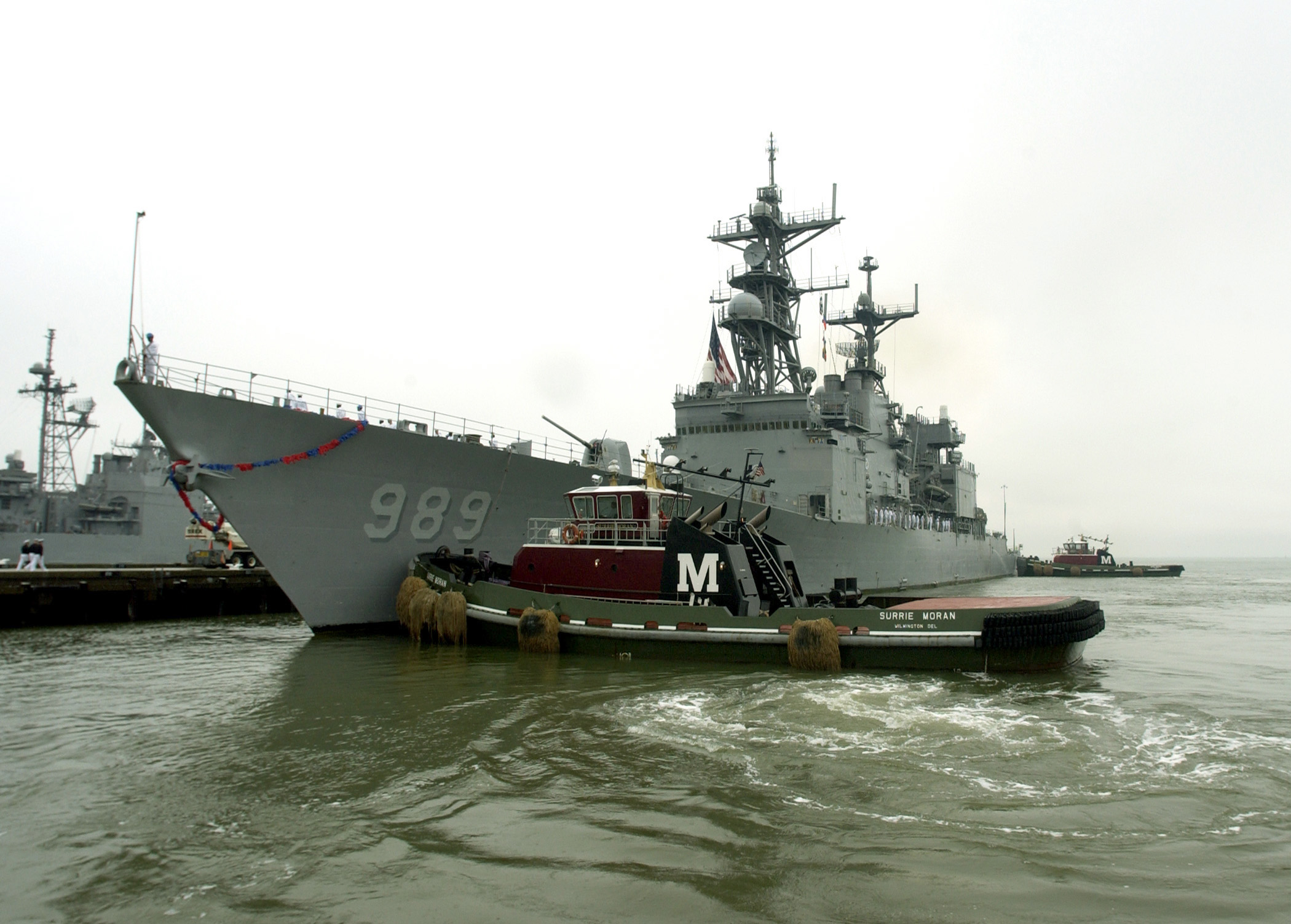
USS Deyo in Norfolk on 23 May 2003
