= USS Morris (DD-271) =

Clemson-class destroyer

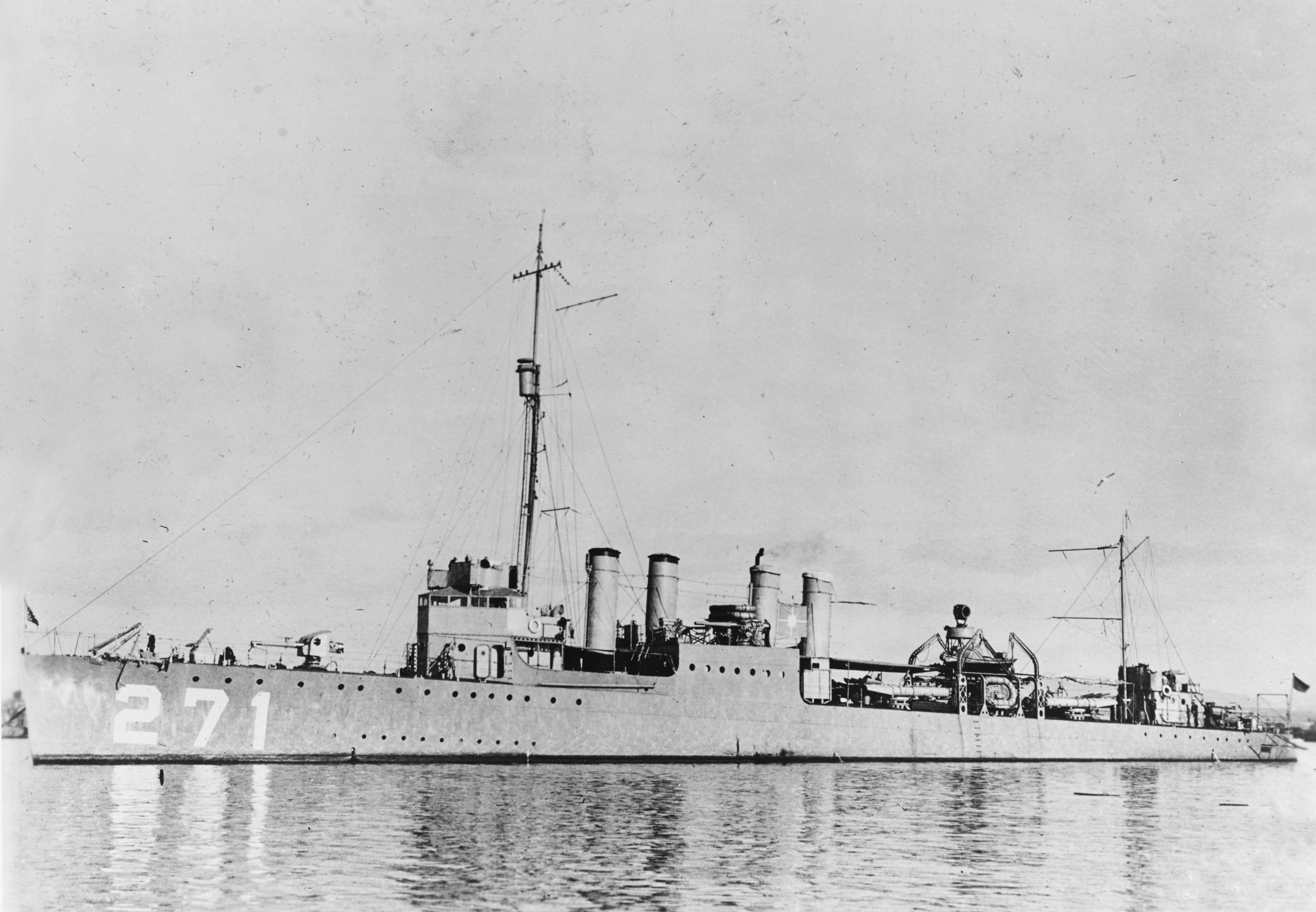

History

United States
- Namesake: Charles Morris
- Builder: Bethlehem Shipbuilding Corporation, Squantum Victory Yard
- Laid down: 20 July 1918
- Launched: 12 April 1919
- Commissioned: 21 July 1919
- Decommissioned: 15 June 1922
- Stricken: 19 May 1936
- Fate: Sold for scrap, 29 September 1936

General characteristics
- Class & type: Clemson-class destroyer
- Displacement: 1,290 long tons (1,311 t) (standard); 1,389 long tons (1,411 t) (deep load)
- Length: 314 ft 4 in (95.8 m)
- Beam: 30 ft 11 in (9.42 m)
- Draught: 10 ft 3 in (3.1 m)
- Installed power: 27,000 shp (20,000 kW); 4 water-tube boilers
- Propulsion: 2 shafts, 2 steam turbines
- Speed: 35 knots (65 km/h; 40 mph) (design)
- Range: 2,500 nautical miles (4,600 km; 2,900 mi) at 20 knots (37 km/h; 23 mph) (design)
- Complement: 6 officers, 108 enlisted men
- Armament: 4 × single 4-inch (102 mm) guns; 2 × single 1-pounder AA guns or; 2 × single 3-inch (76 mm) guns; 4 × triple 21 inch (533 mm) torpedo tubes; 2 × depth charge rails

USS Morris (DD-271) was a Clemson-class destroyer built for the United States Navy during World War I.

== Description ==
The Clemson class was a repeat of the preceding Wickes class although more fuel capacity was added. The ships displaced 1,290 long tons (1,311 t) at standard load and 1,389 long tons (1,411 t) at deep load. They had an overall length of 314 feet 4 inches (95.8 m), a beam of 30 feet 11 inches (9.4 m) and a draught of 10 feet 3 inches (3.1 m). They had a crew of 6 officers and 108 enlisted men.

Performance differed radically between the ships of the class, often due to poor workmanship. The Clemson class was powered by two steam turbines, each driving one propeller shaft, using steam provided by four water-tube boilers. The turbines were designed to produce a total of 27,000 shaft horsepower (20,000 kW) intended to reach a speed of 35 knots (65 km/h; 40 mph). The ships carried a maximum of 371 long tons (377 t) of fuel oil which was intended gave them a range of 2,500 nautical miles (4,600 km; 2,900 mi) at 20 knots (37 km/h; 23 mph).

The ships were armed with four 4-inch (102 mm) guns in single mounts and were fitted with two 1-pounder guns for anti-aircraft defense. In many ships a shortage of 1-pounders caused them to be replaced by 3-inch (76 mm) guns. Their primary weapon, though, was their torpedo battery of a dozen 21 inch (533 mm) torpedo tubes in four triple mounts. They also carried a pair of depth charge rails. A "Y-gun" depth charge thrower was added to many ships.

== Construction and career ==
Morris, named for Charles Morris, was laid down 20 July 1918 by the Fore River Plant, Bethlehem Shipbuilding Corporation, Squantum, Massachusetts; launched 12 April 1919; sponsored by Mrs. George E. Roosevelt, great-granddaughter of Commodore Charles Morris; and commissioned 21 July 1919.

On 26 August 1919 Morris sailed for European waters. A month later she passed through the Strait of Gibraltar and continued on to Split, Croatia (then Yugoslavia). There she joined the Adriatic Detachment which was then performing quasi-political and diplomatic duties in the void caused by the breakup of the Austro-Hungarian Empire. She returned to New York 21 May 1920 and operated briefly on the east coast before sailing for San Diego, California. Steaming via the Panama Canal she arrived at San Diego 7 September and for the next 9 months cruised south for brief patrols off the politically unstable countries of Nicaragua and Mexico.

She decommissioned at San Diego 15 June 1922 and entered the Reserve Fleet. Struck from the Naval Vessel Register 19 May 1936, she was sold to the Schiavone Bonomo Corporation of New York City 29 September 1936.
