= Wilson Small =

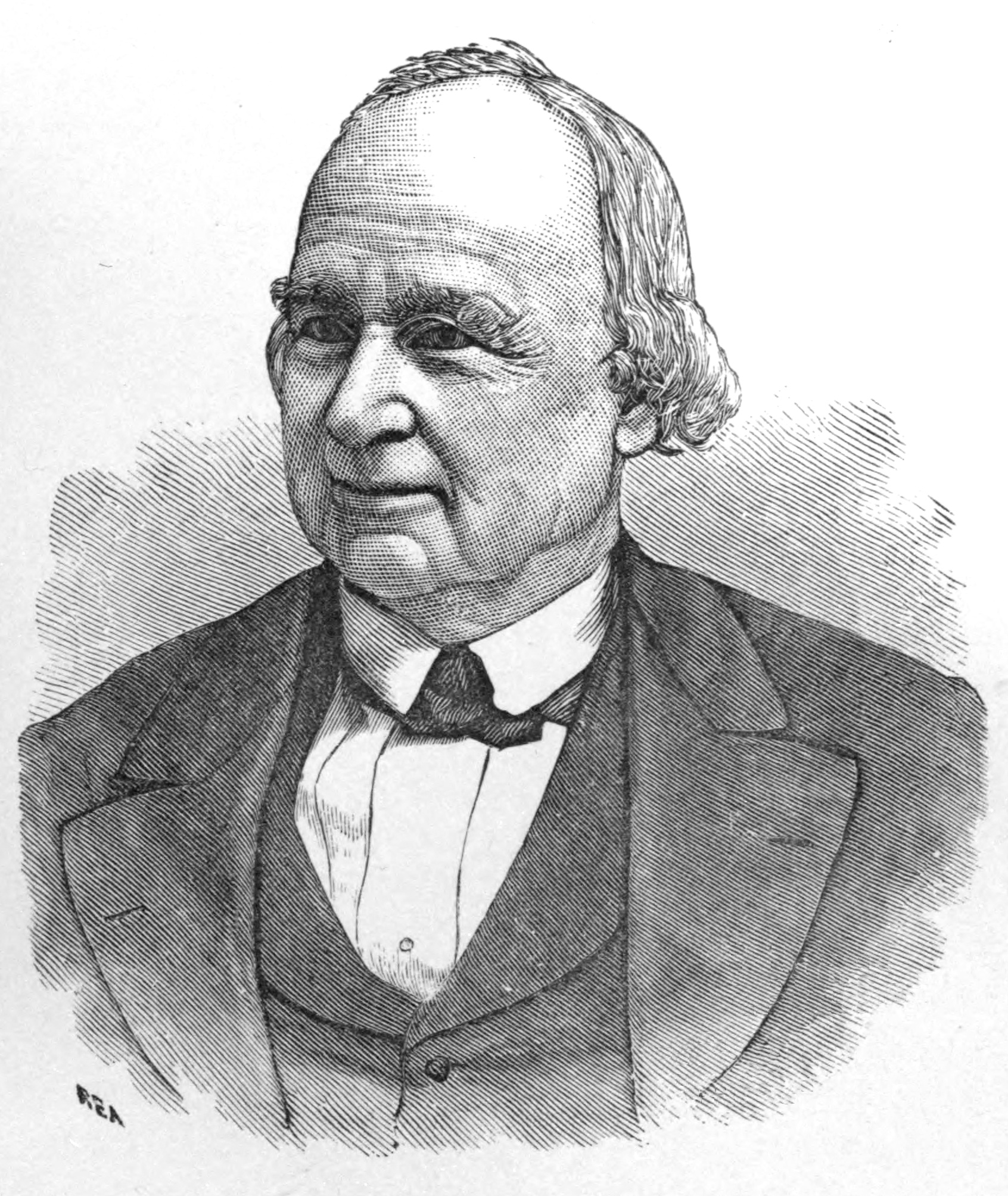

Assembly Member for New York State Assembly
- In office 1846–1847

Personal details
- Born: February 13, 1810 New York City, US
- Died: October 21, 1886 (aged 76) New York City, US
- Party: Democratic Party
- Occupation: Jeweller; Politician; Businessman; Public servant

Wilson Small (1810–1886) was an American tradesman, businessman, politician and public servant. A jeweller by trade, Small took an interest in politics from an early age, and in the 1830s was an organizer of the Locofocos faction of the Democratic Party. In the 1840s, he served two terms as an assemblyman in the New York State Assembly.

After an interval in the 1850s as proprietor of a marine engineering facility—Brooklyn's West Street Foundry—Small joined the civil service, holding a wide variety of government positions over the course of several decades. He was highly active in a voluntary capacity, particularly as a fireman and as a member of the Independent Order of Odd Fellows.

== Life and career ==
Wilson Small was born in New York City on February 13, 1810. His family being unable to afford a good education for him, he entered the workforce at the age of twelve as a jeweller's apprentice. After completing his apprenticeship, he continued to earn a living in the trade until the Panic of 1837.

Small took an interest in politics from an early age, and by 1832 was an organizer of the Equal Rights Party, a Jacksonian faction of the Democratic Party with a strong opposition to government and other monopolies. In 1835, Tammany Hall Democrats attempted to thwart an Equal Rights Party meeting by turning off the gas and plunging the venue into darkness. Having been warned of the plot however, Small and other party leaders had distributed candles and matches to the attendees, so that when the gas was shut off, members were able to light their candles and continue to elect their preferred slate of candidates. The Equal Rights Party thereafter became known as the Locofocos, after the brand name of the matches distributed to members.

In 1846, Small was elected to the New York State Assembly, and was re-elected the following year. After the completion of his second term, he was elected president of the Board of Aldermen in New York's 10th Ward.

In about 1850, taking advantage of a business opportunity, Small acquired the West Street Foundry, a steam engineering works in Brooklyn. During his proprietorship, the company built the engines for at least 18 steam vessels, most notably that of Daniel Webster, one of the finest and fastest New England steamers of her day. Small's contacts through the foundry also led to him briefly accepting a position as captain of the New York steam ferry Boston, but he resigned after finding this line of work unprofitable. The West Street Foundry failed in 1855 during a prolonged shipbuilding slump, and Small then joined the civil service.

Small subsequently held a wide variety of government positions, including water purveyor, court clerk, receiver of taxes, and superintendent of repairs and supplies with New York's Department of Public Works, a position he held until 1873. He was also a school trustee and commissioner in the Public School Department from 1843 until about 1868, during which time he advocated and helped establish the Free Academy, known today as the City College of New York. His last position was as chairman of the Board of Assessors and foreclosure clerk in New York's Superior Court, which he held for some 14 years.

=== Personal details ===
Small served as a member of New York's Volunteer Fire Department for 16 years, until its reorganization in 1865 as a professional body; he was also a long-serving trustee of the Fire Department Benevolent Fund. He was a Sachem, and later the longterm Sagamore, of Tammany Hall. He joined the Independent Order of Odd Fellows in 1833, and in 1840 was elected Grand Master of the New York branch, continuing as a member for fifty years or more; he was also a senior member of the Freemasons. He was active in the affairs of the Episcopal Church, and was a director, and for some years president, of the Mechanics and Tradesmens Society. He was an effective public speaker, known for his brevity and succinctness.

Small was married three times and widowed at least once. After living all his life in New York City, he died there on October 21, 1886, at the age of 76. He was survived by his third wife and three children.
