= Daniel Webster (steamboat) =

American ship built in 1853

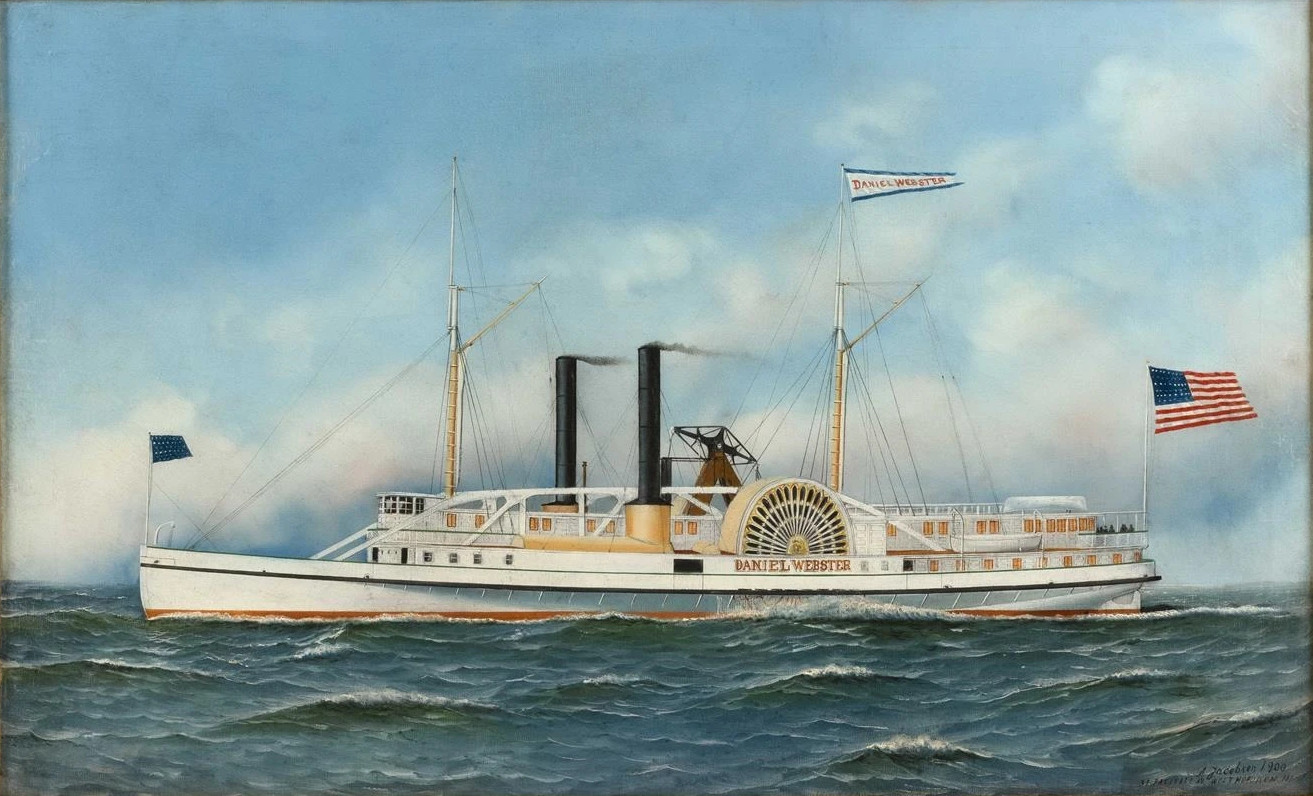
- Oil painting of Daniel Webster by Antonio Jacobsen

History
- Namesake: Daniel Webster
- Owner: Maine Steam Navigation Co. (1853–62); Spear, Lang & Delano (1862–67?); Richmond & York River RR Co. (1871–72); St. Lawrence Tow Boat Co. (1872–75); St. Lawrence Steam Navigation Co. (1875–84)
- Operator: As for owners, except: U.S. Quartermaster Dept. (1862–65) (Note: Intermittently; see text.)
- Route: Portland, ME – Bangor, ME (1853–63); Boston, MA – Bath, ME (1864–66); Baltimore, MD – West Point, VA (1871–72); Quebec City – Chicoutimi (1873–84)
- Builder: Samuel Sneden (Greenpoint, NY)
- Launched: January 3, 1853
- Maiden voyage: April 21, 1853
- Renamed: Daniel Webster No. 2 (1862) (Note: Possibly only a clerical name used by the Quartermaster Dept. rather than an officially registered name, as it is not mentioned in contemporaneous sources other than in government and Sanitary Commission correspondence, nor in Lytle-Holdcamper.); Expounder (1862); Daniel Webster (1865); Saguenay (1872)
- Fate: Destroyed by fire, Pointe au Pic, Quebec, Canada, September 24, 1884

General characteristics
- Type: Sidewheel steamboat
- Tonnage: 766 grt (original); 910 grt (1870)
- Length: 240 ft (73 m)
- Beam: 34 ft (10 m)
- Depth of hold: 10 ft 7 in (3.23 m)
- Installed power: Single-cylinder vertical beam: 52 in bore × 11 ft stroke
- Propulsion: 33 ft (10 m) diameter sidewheels

Daniel Webster was an American steamboat built in 1853 for passenger service on the coast of Maine. When new, she was the largest and fastest steamer in Maine coastal service, and widely considered to be the finest.

Daniel Webster spent her first eight years operating between the Maine cities of Portland and Bangor. With the outbreak of the American Civil War in April 1861, she was chartered by the United States War Department and used as a troop transport. In early 1862, she was assigned to the United States Sanitary Commission and converted into a hospital boat. Dubbed Daniel Webster No. 2 to distinguish her from another chartered vessel of the same name, she was used to transfer wounded soldiers from the Peninsula Campaign battlefront to hospitals in the rear. Later, under the name Expounder, she was again used as a troop transport. In between her four wartime stints in government service, she made brief returns to passenger service in Maine.

In 1864, Expounder began running in passenger service between Boston, Massachusetts, and Bath, Maine, soon thereafter resuming her original name. By 1867, competition from a newer steamboat caused her to be withdrawn from the route, and she lay idle for a time. In 1871, she was sold to a railroad company, who employed her between Baltimore, Maryland, and West Point, Virginia, but this service too lasted only a couple of seasons.

In 1872, Daniel Webster was sold to a Canadian firm. Renamed Saguenay, she ran on Quebec's St. Lawrence and Saguenay rivers, taking tourists on fishing and sightseeing tours as well as transporting freight and livestock. After 12 years on this route, she was destroyed by an accidental fire in September 1884 at Pointe au Pic, Quebec.

== Construction and design ==
During the 1840s, two railroads, the Boston and Maine and the Eastern, independently completed rail lines between Boston, Massachusetts, and Portland in southern Maine. By the early 1850s, an increase in traffic to northeastern Maine persuaded the two rival railroads to jointly establish a steamboat service linking their depots in Portland with the northeastern Maine city of Bangor. A new firm, the Maine Steam Navigation Company, was incorporated in 1853 to achieve this end, and a new steamboat ordered from the shipyard of Samuel Sneden in Greenpoint, New York. The steamer was named Daniel Webster in honor of the late Massachusetts statesman.

Daniel Webster, a wooden-hulled sidewheeler, was launched at Sneden's yard on January 3, 1853, and completed in April the same year. Built of white oak and chestnut with copper and iron fastenings, the steamer was 240 feet (73 m) in length—220 feet (67 m) between perpendiculars—with a beam of 34 feet (10 m) and hold depth of 10 feet 7 inches (3.23 m) Her gross register tonnage was 766. (Note: Her original official registered tonnage. In 1864, a new method of calculating tonnages was introduced in the United States, which resulted in an adjustment for Daniel Webster's tonnage to 819. A number of sources cite a tonnage of 900 or 910, the figure recorded in ship registers from 1870 on.)

The steamer was powered by a single-cylinder vertical beam engine with bore of 52 inches (130 cm) and stroke of 11 feet (3.4 m), built by the West Street Foundry of Brooklyn, New York. (Note: The link shows only the bottom of the broadsheet page; the top of the page, which includes the article title, is at another url, but the relevant content can be found at the given link in column 3.) Steam was supplied by two iron boilers, one on each guard—an arrangement designed to lessen injuries to passengers, and damage to the ship, in the event of a boiler explosion. Her paddlewheels were 33 feet (10 m) in diameter. As an additional safety feature, she was fitted with an independent engine and boiler for working the fire and water pumps.

Daniel Webster was one of the first steamers to be designed expressly for service in the rough waters of the Maine coast, having a higher than usual topside and strongly planked bulwarks forward. She was also the first Maine steamer to be fitted with a full saloon deck—which included 44 staterooms and a public parlor—above the main deck, in the manner of the latest Long Island Sound steamers. As a night boat, the vessel was fitted with 200 sleeping berths. Her saloon decorations included a lifesize portrait of the steamer's namesake, donated by his friends, who also gifted the vessel an elegant piano with a value in excess of $600 (equivalent to $23,200 in 2025).

On entering service, Daniel Webster was the largest steamer operating on the Maine coast, and would soon prove herself the fastest. In overall appointments and finish she was widely considered the finest. Her superior qualities quickly made her a favorite with the traveling public, and she would maintain a high reputation throughout her career.

== Service history ==
=== Portland–Bangor service, 1853–1861 ===
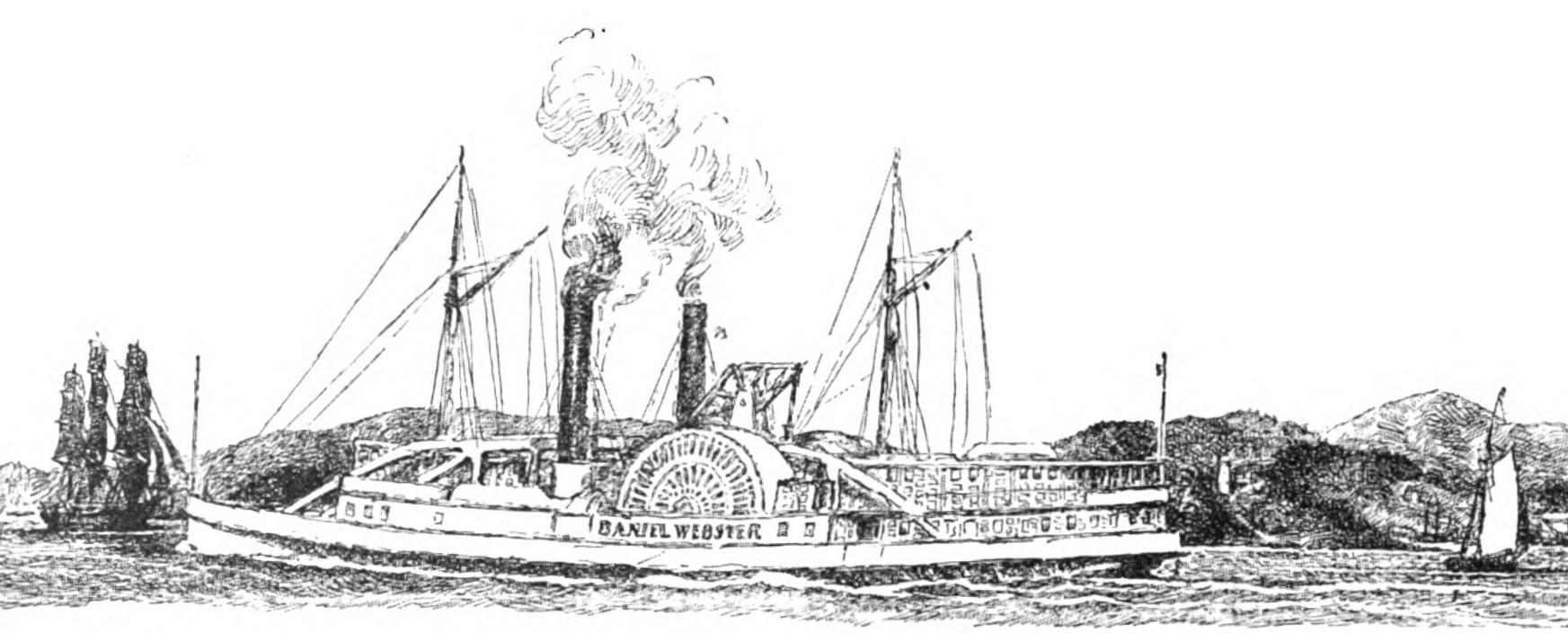
Sketch of Daniel Webster in early service by John Wolcott Adams

Daniel Webster completed her maiden voyage from Portland to Bangor on April 21, 1853. She thereafter settled into a regular schedule, departing her home port of Bangor at 6 am on Mondays, Wednesdays and Fridays, and clearing Portland the same evenings—after the arrival of the express train from Boston at around 5 pm—for the overnight return trip. Intermediate stops on the route included Hampden, Frankfort and Bucksport on the Penobscot River, and Searsport, Belfast, Camden and Rockland on the Maine coast; at the latter port, she connected with the steamboat Rockland for Machiasport. The fare between Bangor and Portland was $2 (equivalent to $77 in 2025)—$3 ($116) if an additional leg by train between Portland and Boston was included.

Initially, Daniel Webster found herself in competition on the route with the Sanford Independent Line's steamer Governor, but early in the season, the owners of the two steamboats decided that it was in their mutual interest to run their vessels on alternate days, the two together thus providing a daily service. By 1854, Daniel Webster had reportedly attracted most of the patronage regardless, and in July, the Sanford Line chartered Governor elsewhere, leaving Daniel Webster to operate on the route alone.

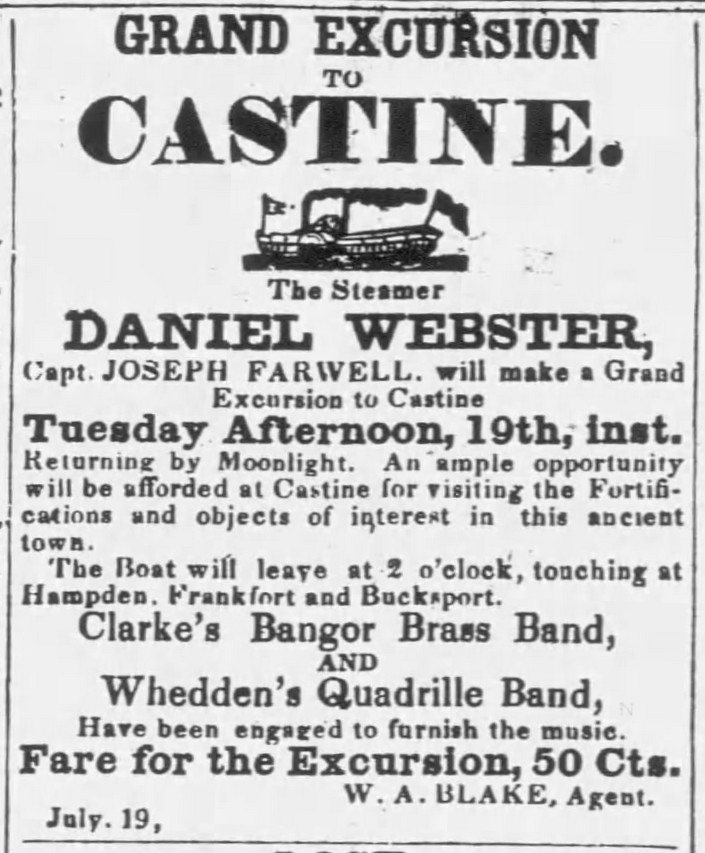
1853 excursion advertisement for Daniel Webster

In addition to her regular service, Daniel Webster was occasionally employed on excursions, such as day trips, sightseeing tours and school outings. In July and August 1856, the steamer was chartered by the Republican Party for several political conventions—said at the time to be the largest ever held in eastern Maine—in support of presidential candidate John C. Frémont. Daniel Webster was typically loaded to capacity for these conventions, on one occasion taking 1,500 passengers in a single trip from Bangor to the convention venue at Frankfort. Both Daniel Webster and her associated railroads reduced their prices by half for convention attendees.

In late August 1856, Daniel Webster was making her way up the Penobscot in heavy fog when the brig Lady of the Lake collided with her just forward of the pilot house. Taking water rapidly, the steamer reversed almost a mile (1.6 km) to beach herself at Belfast, where her passengers and cargo were later transferred to the steamers Boston and Penobscot. The Webster was evidently not too badly damaged in this incident, as she was back in service before the end of the month.

During the 1856–1857 winter off-season, the steamer was renovated and reboilered. After returning to service, she broke a piston head in July 1857 while on the way to Bangor, arriving late as a result; the problem was quickly rectified in port and the steamer was returned to service the following day. In August 1858, a schooner collided with the Webster in heavy fog off Rockland, damaging the steamer's cutwater; the schooner disappeared quickly in the fog before she could be identified or the extent of her damage ascertained.

In early September 1858, Daniel Webster was host to then-United States senator, and future president of the Confederate States of America, Jefferson Davis. The Mississippi senator, who had spent the summer in Maine for health reasons, traveled aboard the steamer from Portland to Belfast, where he conducted a troop inspection and gave a speech.

Daniel Webster was absent from her usual route for reasons unknown in early 1860, her place taken by the steamer Forest City, which was chartered for the purpose from the Portland Line. The Webster returned to the route, replacing Forest City, in August.

=== American Civil War service, 1861–1864 ===
With the outbreak of the American Civil War in April 1861, Daniel Webster's captain publicly pledged to transport Union troops and munitions on the steamer free of charge. A few weeks later, the steamer, with a contingent of the newly-formed Maine Coast Guard aboard, overtook and captured a yacht stolen from Biddeford, the Guard apparently claiming it as their first war prize. On June 17, Daniel Webster transported the 1,100 men of the 4th Maine Infantry Regiment from Rockland to Portland on their way to the battlefront.

In March 1862, Daniel Webster was chartered by the United States War Department, the first of four such charters the steamer would negotiate during the war. The first two of these were contracted for a fee of $600 (equivalent to $19,400 in 2025) per day, and the last two for $300 per day. In government service, the steamer was referred to as Daniel Webster No. 2 to distinguish her from the steamship Daniel Webster (dubbed Daniel Webster No. 1) which had also been chartered by the government.

In mid April, Daniel Webster No. 2 transported an infantry regiment from Maine to Ship Point, Virginia, (near Yorktown) to participate in the Peninsula Campaign. Shortly thereafter, the steamer was assigned to the York River headquarters of the United States Sanitary Commission and outfitted as a hospital boat. Her principal task at this time was the transportation of wounded soldiers from the front line to hospitals in the rear. As she was classified by the Army as a "coast steamer"—that is, a vessel not designed for deepwater service—her range was restricted to regional hospitals, namely those at Fort Monroe; Washington, D.C.; and Philadelphia. On May 9, for example, the steamer took 200 soldiers, wounded in the Battle of Williamsburg, to Fort Monroe; future memoirist Eliza Howland was a nurse on this trip.

Conditions on the hospital boats could at times be dire. Nurse Katherine Prescott Wormeley described a scene in June when a surplus of wounded men were moved across Daniel Webster No. 2 to the steamer Vanderbilt:

Men in every condition of horror, shattered and shrieking, were being brought in on stretchers ... Imagine a great river or Sound steamer filled on every deck,—every berth and every square inch of room covered with wounded men; even the stairs and gangways and guards filled with those who are less badly wounded; and then imagine fifty well men, on every kind of errand, rushing to and fro over them, every touch bringing agony to the poor fellows, while stretcher after stretcher came along, hoping to find an empty place; and then imagine what it was like to ... make sure that every man on both those boats was properly refreshed and fed. We got through at 1 am ... when a message came that one hundred and fifty men were just arriving by the [rail]cars. It was raining in torrents, and both boats were full. We went on shore; the same scene repeated [with the steamer Kennebec] ... we went to bed at daylight.

In July, while operating on the James River, Daniel Webster No. 2 was fired upon by Confederate cannon and hit six times, one ball passing through the pilot house and another through one of the smokestacks. Both the steamer and her crew escaped serious injury, with only the pilot being slightly wounded.

Daniel Webster No. 2 completed her first government charter in October and returned to Maine, still bearing the scars of her wartime service, which included the cannonball hits, "fifty to a hundred rifle ball holes in her sides" and other damage. Briefly, she returned to her prewar commercial service between Portland and Bangor, but in late October was advertised for sale. The following month, she was purchased by Spear, Lang & Delano of Boston, (Note: Heyl erroneously states that the buyer was a Philadelphia firm, E. A. Souder & Co., who owned the vessel until 1867, when she was sold to Spear, Lang & Delano, who then placed her in Boston–Bath service. In fact, she was bought by Spear, Lang & Delano in 1862, her Boston–Bath service began in 1864, and by 1867 she had stopped running on the route.) who decided to remodel her with government service in mind. Planned alterations to the steamer over the winter off-season, intended to improve her seagoing abilities, included shortening her guards both fore and aft by 4 feet (1.2 m), and relocating her boilers from the guards to the hull. Work was completed by December 19, by which time her government charter had been renewed. The clumsy former name Daniel Webster No. 2 was dispensed with during her rebuild, in favor of Expounder (after a nickname formerly applied to her namesake). To replace her on the Portland–Bangor route, Spear, Lang & Delano debuted their newly built steamer Harvest Moon. (Note: Dunbaugh erroneously states that Harvest Moon began service on the Portland–Bangor route in late 1862; in fact, she was not launched until late November 1862 and did not make her trial trip until March 1863.)

In July 1863, Expounder returned from government service to renew her Portland–Bangor service for a few months, taking over from Harvest Moon, which was transferred to a route from Portland to the Kennebec River. Expounder was chartered by the government again in October; her subsequent wartime operations are not known.

=== Boston–Bath service and after, 1864–1870 ===
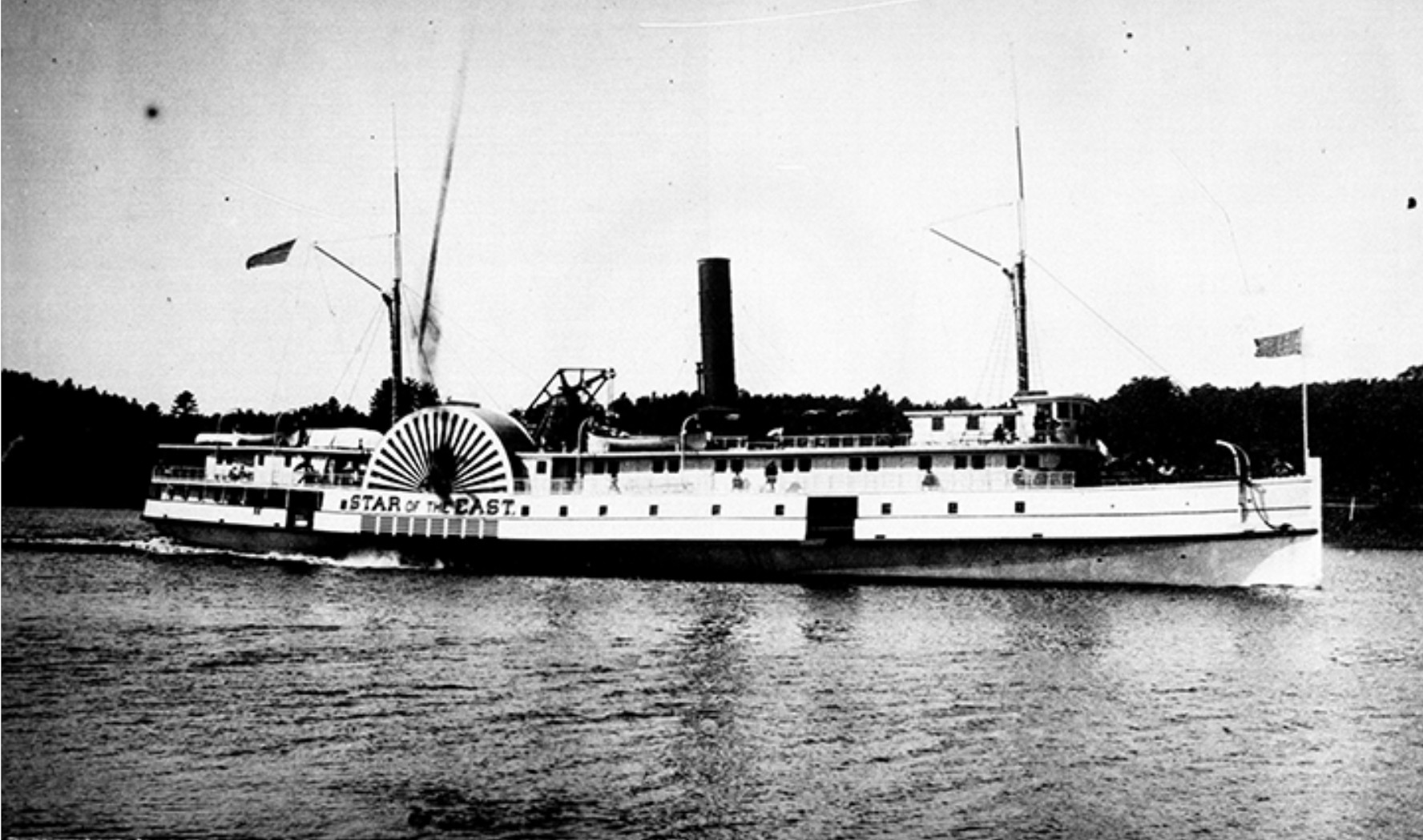
The 1400-ton Star of the East, chief competitor of Daniel Webster and Eastern City on the Boston–Bath route

In November 1864, Expounder resumed merchant service in Maine, though not on her original route. Instead, she commenced running on a newly established, thrice-weekly passenger service between Boston and Bath, Maine, in opposition to the steamer Eastern Queen. Expounder's partner on this route was the steamer Eastern City, the two providing a daily service, with a departure time from each city of 6 pm. By 1865, Expounder's original name, Daniel Webster, had been restored, and after returning from a final government charter in August, she resumed service on the Boston–Bath route, albeit without her stablemate Eastern City, which had been transferred to Philadelphia.

In 1866, Eastern City returned from Philadelphia to again run in partnership with the Webster. Later that year, however, the opposition added the newly completed Star of the East, the largest Maine steamer then in service. A rate war ensued, during which fares dropped to just 25 cents (equivalent to $5 in 2025). Spear, Lang & Delano were unable to sustain the battle beyond the year, and in 1867, both Daniel Webster and Eastern City lay idle until July, when they were reportedly put up for auction. No record of service for either boat has been found from 1867 through 1870. (Note: A September 1870 newspaper report states that Daniel Webster, "the old time favorite in the waters of the Penobscot", was in dry dock "preparatory to once more being put into a[c]tive service.")

=== Baltimore – West Point service, 1871–1872 ===
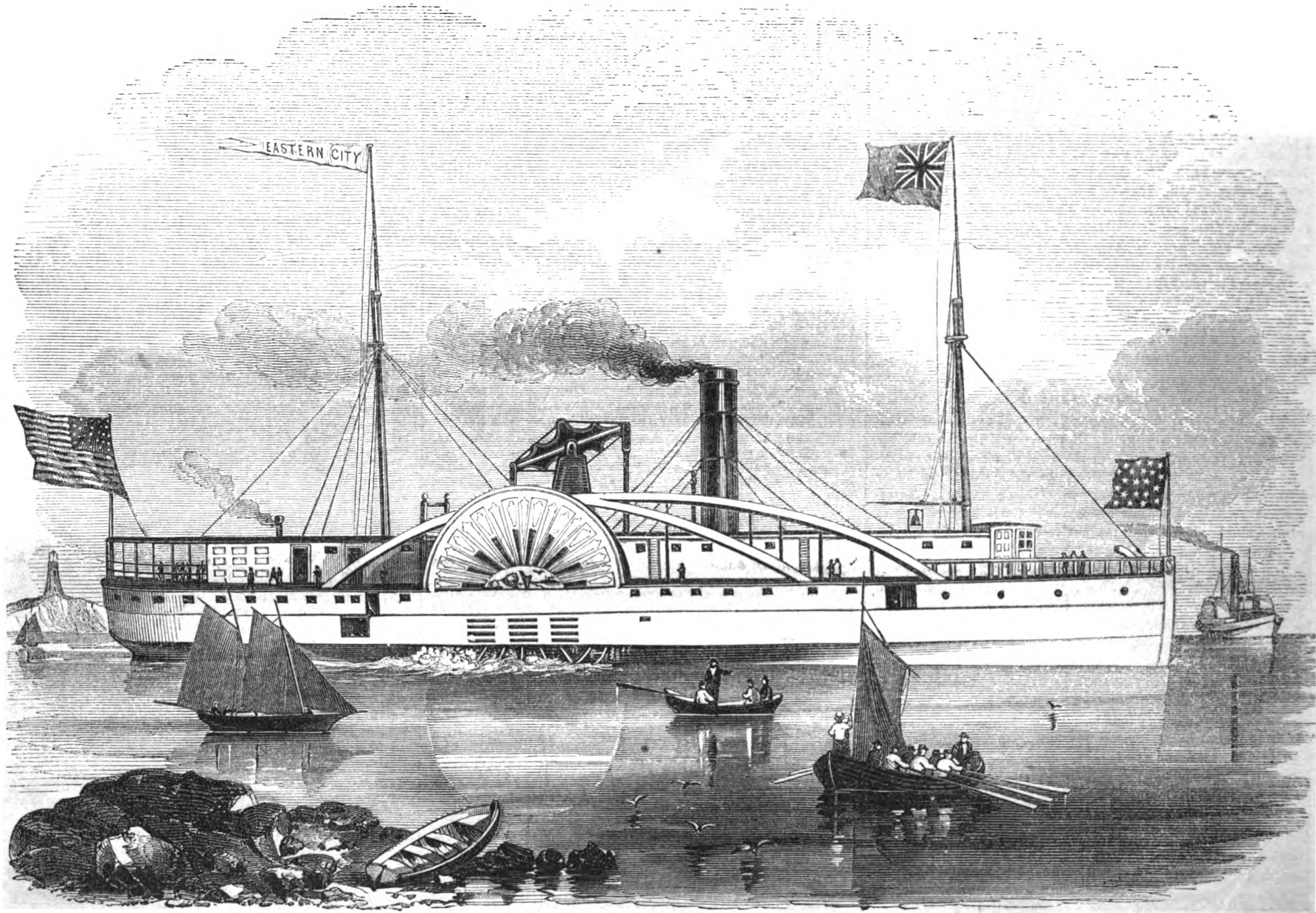
Eastern City in 1852. Later known as St. Lawrence, the steamer was Daniel Webster's running mate on three different routes, and through three changes of ownership, over the course of some 17 years.

In 1871, Daniel Webster and her stablemate Eastern City were acquired by the Richmond and York River Railroad of Virginia. Eastern City was the first of the pair to enter service for the company, on a route between Baltimore, Maryland, and the rail connection at West Point, Virginia. In September, Daniel Webster, which had been delayed by the installation of a new boiler, joined her, the two thus providing a daily service. The railroad ran into financial difficulties in 1872, and after less than two years on the route, both steamers were sold to a Canadian company. (Note: Both Dunbaugh and Dayton fail to mention that the steamers briefly went into Baltimore service before being sold to Canadian interests.)

=== Canadian service, 1873–1884 ===
The new owners of Daniel Webster and Eastern City, the St. Lawrence Tow Boat Company (later known as the St. Lawrence Steam Navigation Company), renamed the two steamers Saguenay and St. Lawrence respectively. The two, along with the larger steamer Union, were placed on a route between Quebec City on the lower St. Lawrence River and Chicoutimi on the Saguenay River, with intermediate stops including La Malbaie, Baie-Saint-Paul, Les Éboulements and Rivière-du-Loup on the St. Lawrence, and Tadoussac, L'Anse-Saint-Jean and Ha Ha Bay on the Saguenay. The line offered this service four days a week, Tuesdays through Saturdays. Since a round trip took two days, two of the three steamers would typically make the trip twice a week.

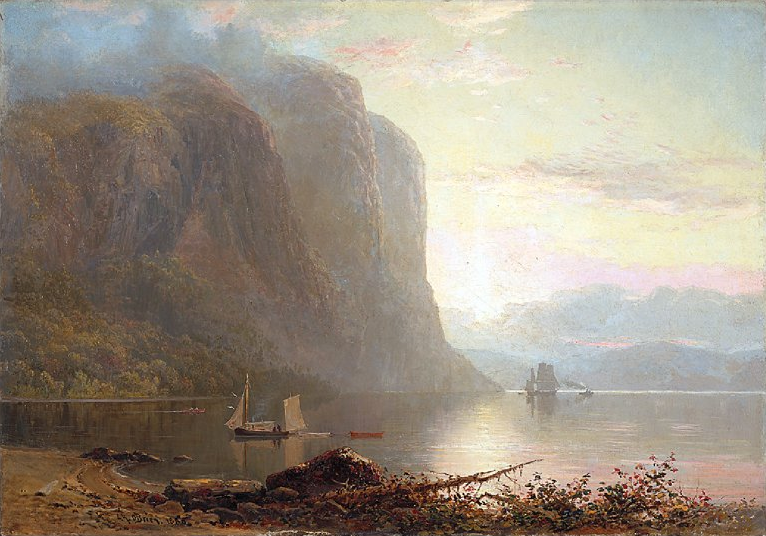
Cap Trinité in 1880

Tourism was an important component of the trade on this route. The steamboat line promoted the attractions of sea bathing, fishing, and the "far famed" scenery of the Saguenay, while the rustic charms of the smaller settlements along the route were also appealing for some. Particular highlights for tourists included visits to Éternité Bay and Cap Trinité on the Saguenay, where the river is up to 2.5 kilometres (1.6 mi) deep and the surrounding peaks rise to a height of 550 metres (1,800 ft); at these locations, steamboats of the line would stop their engines and sound their whistles or fire a cannon to demonstrate the remarkable echo. A further enticement for travelers aboard Saguenay was the cuisine, with one reviewer describing it as "equal to a first-class hotel", while others commented on the superior quality of the fresh-caught salmon and other produce. Local trade for the steamers included the transport of freight and livestock.

In her first season on the route, Saguenay broke her crankshaft and was out of commission for some time. A new crankshaft, seven tons in weight—and said by the Montreal Witness to be the largest forging ever produced in the country to that time—was supplied by the Moisin Iron Company of Montreal in September. Saguenay would continue on the Quebec City – Chicoutimi route until 1884, latterly running in partnership with the steamer Union.

=== Loss ===
At about 11:30 pm on September 25, 1884, while on a return voyage to Quebec City, Saguenay was lying at Pointe au Pic, La Malbaie, when a passenger noticed flames and raised the alarm. The captain immediately ordered the steam pumps to be put into operation, but because the fire was directly above the engine, they could not be manned. Most of the passengers, many still in their nightclothes, were quickly roused and hastened to safety, after which the steamer was cut loose to allow her to drift away from the wharf. In the afterpart of the vessel, however, a dozen passengers had been cut off by the flames and driven below deck. After trying, apparently in vain, to signal for help, they attempted to escape through the portholes, intending to use pieces of lumber from the cargo hold as floats, but with minutes to spare, they were rescued by a crew member in a small boat.

The steamer eventually drifted about 150 metres (490 ft) offshore and burned to the waterline before sinking, taking with her all of the mails, most of the passengers' belongings, and a substantial number of cattle. No persons lost their lives in the accident. Considered a "fine steamer" to the end, Saguenay's value at the time was estimated to be in the vicinity of $60,000 (equivalent to $2,150,000 in 2025), only about half of which was covered by insurance.
