= Santa Claus (steamboat) =

Hudson River steamboat built 1845

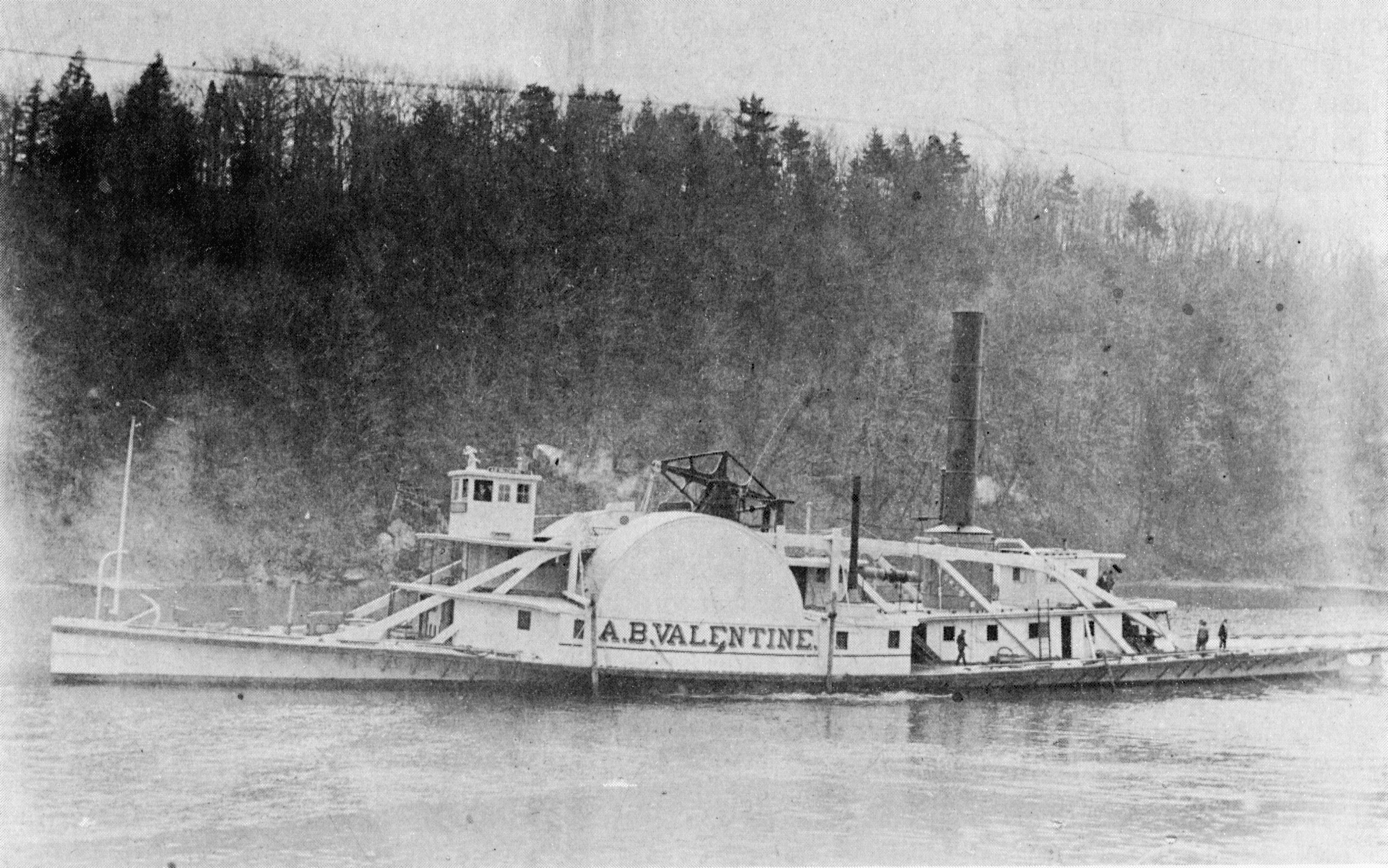
- The former Santa Claus after removal of her passenger accommodations and conversion to the towboat A. B. Valentine

History
- Name: Santa Claus
- Namesake: Santa Claus
- Owner: E. Fitch & Co. (1845–1853); Cornell Steamboat Co. (1853–1901)
- Operator: New Steamboat Co. (1845); People's Line (1846); Unknown (1847); People's Line (1848); Unknown (1849–1851); Independent Line (1852); Cornell Steamboat Co. (1853–1901)
- Builder: W. & T. Collyer (New York, NY)
- Launched: April 16, 1845
- Completed: July 1845
- Maiden voyage: July 19, 1845
- In service: 1845–1901
- Renamed: A. B. Valentine (1869)
- Refit: Converted to towboat, 1856; Major refit 1869
- Identification: Official No. 23689
- Fate: Scrapped at Perth Amboy, 1901

General characteristics
- Type: Sidewheel steamboat
- Tonnage: 1845: 385 gross; 1869: 305 gross, 191 net
- Length: 1845: 181 ft 5 in (55.30 m); 1847: 209 ft (64 m)
- Beam: 24 ft 3 in (7.39 m) over hull
- Depth: 8 ft 4 in (2.54 m)
- Installed power: Single-cylinder vertical beam; 42 in (110 cm) bore × 10 ft (3.0 m) stroke
- Propulsion: Sidewheels

Santa Claus was a sidewheel passenger-and-freight steamboat built in 1845 for service on the Hudson River between Wilbur, New York, (part of modern-day Kingston) and New York City. In her first few years of operation, Santa Claus saw service on a number of different Hudson River routes, most notably between Albany and New York City. She was also employed from time to time as an excursion steamer. A highlight of her career occurred in 1852, when she had the honor of conveying the remains of American statesman Henry Clay from New York City to Albany en route to their final resting place.

In 1853, after her original owners had struggled for some years to find Santa Claus a regular route, she was sold to the Cornell Steamboat Company, which placed her in passenger service between Rondout, New York, and New York City. This strategy proved successful enough that after only two years, she was replaced by a larger steamer to address the growing demand. Santa Claus was then converted into a towboat, in which capacity she would continue to serve the Cornell company on the Hudson River to the end of her career.

In 1869, Santa Claus was rebuilt and returned to service under the name A. B. Valentine. She continued to operate as a towboat between Rondout and the city until 1887, when she was transferred to the less demanding Rondout to Albany route. A. B. Valentine was broken up at Perth Amboy, New Jersey, in 1901 after a 56-year career.

== Construction and design ==
Ezra Fitch, a relative of steamboat pioneer John Fitch, was a businessman from Wilbur, New York, (part of modern-day Kingston) who owned a number of canal boats and Hudson River sloops. In February 1845, his firm, E. Fitch & Company, announced its first venture into steam navigation with the proposed establishment of a regular steam service between Wilbur and New York City. Fitch contracted with a New York shipbuilding firm, W. & T. Collyer, for construction of a steamboat for the service, which vessel was launched on April 16. Fitch had initially intended to name the steamer St. Nicholas, but when another company's steamer was so named, he decided—after briefly flirting with the alternative spelling Santa Klaas—to name his new vessel Santa Claus.

Santa Claus was a wooden-hulled sidewheeler with a length of 181 feet 5 inches (55.30 m), beam of 24 feet 3 inches (7.39 m), (Note: At this time in the United States, a sidewheel steamer's beam was usually measured across the hull only, rather than across the hull, paddlewheels and guards.) hold depth of 8 feet 4 inches (2.54 m) and gross register tonnage of 385. Her passenger accommodations included separate cabins for male and female passengers—a common arrangement for steamboats of the day—while 12 staterooms, including two doubles, were installed on the second or promenade deck. The steamer also had freight capacity, and the main deck forward was reserved for carrying livestock.

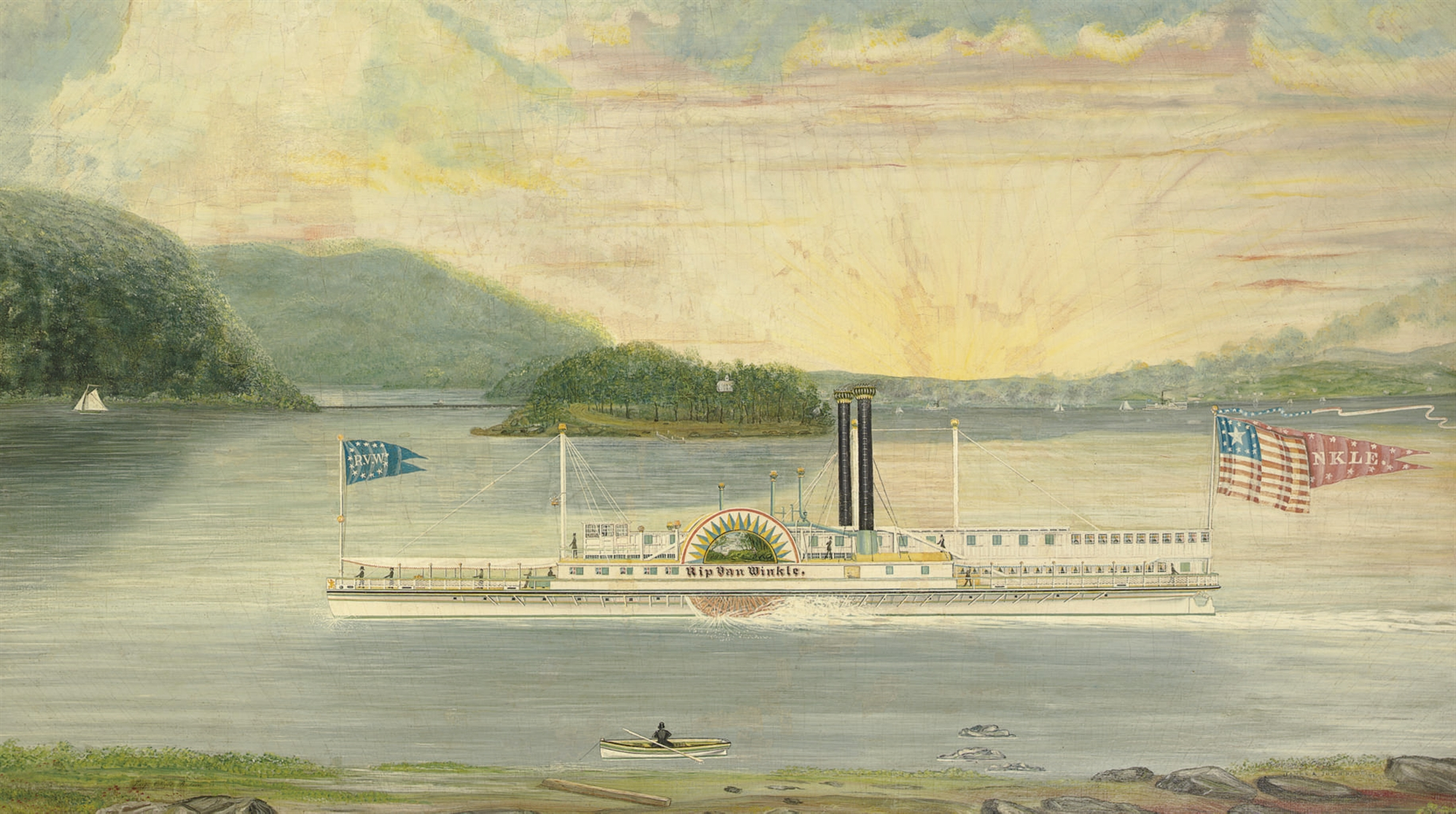
Santa Claus's boilers were originally built for the larger steamboat Rip Van Winkle (pictured)

Santa Claus was powered by a single-cylinder vertical beam steam engine with bore of 42 inches (110 cm) and stroke of 10 feet (3.0 m), built by the West Street Foundry of Brooklyn, New York. According to a newspaper notice placed by the steamer's owners, her two boilers were originally built for the steamboat Rip Van Winkle, but proving too small for that vessel, were acquired by the company and installed in Santa Claus instead. (Note: The engine builder identified in this source, Joseph E. Coffee, was the proprietor of the West Street Foundry.) Santa Claus's speed is not known, but according to contemporaneous reports, she was a fast boat. (Note: The fact that Santa Claus operated for some years on the highly competitive New York to Albany route is further evidence of her speed. According to one source, Santa Claus and Niagara were the two fastest boats on the route in 1845.)

The steamer's decorations were in conformity with her name. On one paddle box was a painting of Santa Claus climbing down the chimney of an old Dutch-style house with a bag of toys over his shoulder, while his reindeer and sleigh stood nearby; on the other, he was portrayed inside the house, about to ascend the chimney after having filled the Christmas stockings. The steamboat's figurehead was a carving of Santa, while in the saloon a large painting, once again depicting Santa about to descend a chimney, was featured. Only atop the pilothouse was there a deviation from the overall theme, in the form of a statue of Cupid with bow and arrow. The paddle box and saloon paintings were done by John Vanderlyn Jr., a nephew of renowned Kingston artist John Vanderlyn. Writing in the 1980s, marine historian Donald C. Ringwald had the following to say about the steamer's idiosyncratic theme:

Probably there never was such a holiday boat. In this day and age, money-minded merchants are criticized for diluting Christmas over many weeks. But here was a case when it was spread over the entire year.

In spite of her thematic association with the festive season, Santa Claus, like other Hudson River steamers, was typically unable to operate over the Christmas – New Year period due to the presence of river ice. (Note: For example, the navigation season on the Hudson ended on December 3 in 1845, the 14th in 1846, the 24th in 1847, the 17th in 1850, the 11th in 1851, the 23rd in 1852, the 20th in 1853 and 1854 and so on. The winter ice season on the Hudson generally runs from mid-December to late March.)

== Service history ==
=== Wilbur – New York service, 1845–1846 ===
Santa Claus embarked on her maiden voyage from New York to Rondout Creek at 4:30 pm Saturday, July 19, 1845. After a 23-minute stopover at Poughkeepsie, the vessel reached Wilbur at 10:45 pm, where she was welcomed by a large crowd and a brass band. The following Monday, she made her first trip as an excursion steamer, taking 400 to 500 passengers on a Hudson River outing. She thereafter settled into a regular schedule, departing Kingston for New York at 7 pm on Mondays, Wednesdays and Fridays, and returning from New York on alternate days, with a departure time of 4 pm. Unlike other steamers operating from the Kingston/Rondout locality, Santa Claus did not engage in the towing of barges, in the hope that customers would appreciate a faster service; a typical trip by the steamer on the given route took about six hours.

On the evening of Saturday, August 9, Santa Claus was caught in a squall off Ossining and lost both her smokestacks overboard. The steamer suffered no further damage in the incident, but a 50 cent excursion to Albany scheduled for the following Monday had to be postponed while she underwent repairs.

By mid-October, Santa Claus had been joined by the steamboat Eureka, the two boats operating together to provide a daily service, departing Kingston at 6 pm and New York City from 4 pm excepting Sundays, when the New York departure time was changed to 7 am. Way landings on these trips included Rhinebeck, New Palz, Hyde Park, Poughkeepsie, Milton, New Hamburg, Fishkill, Newburgh, Cornwall, Cold Spring, West Point and Peekskill. This daily service quickly proved too frequent for the available patronage and was discontinued before year's end, with Santa Claus finishing the season alone.

The 1846 steamboat season opened with Santa Claus running a 7 pm service from Wilbur to New York on Mondays, Wednesdays and Fridays, returning from the city on alternate days with a departure time of 3 pm. This schedule was soon changed to a daily service running Mondays through Saturdays, with the steamer leaving Wilbur at 6 am, while the departure time at New York stayed at 3 pm. The daily service lasted only a short time, as demand for it again proved insufficient.

=== Albany – New York and other routes, 1846–1852 ===
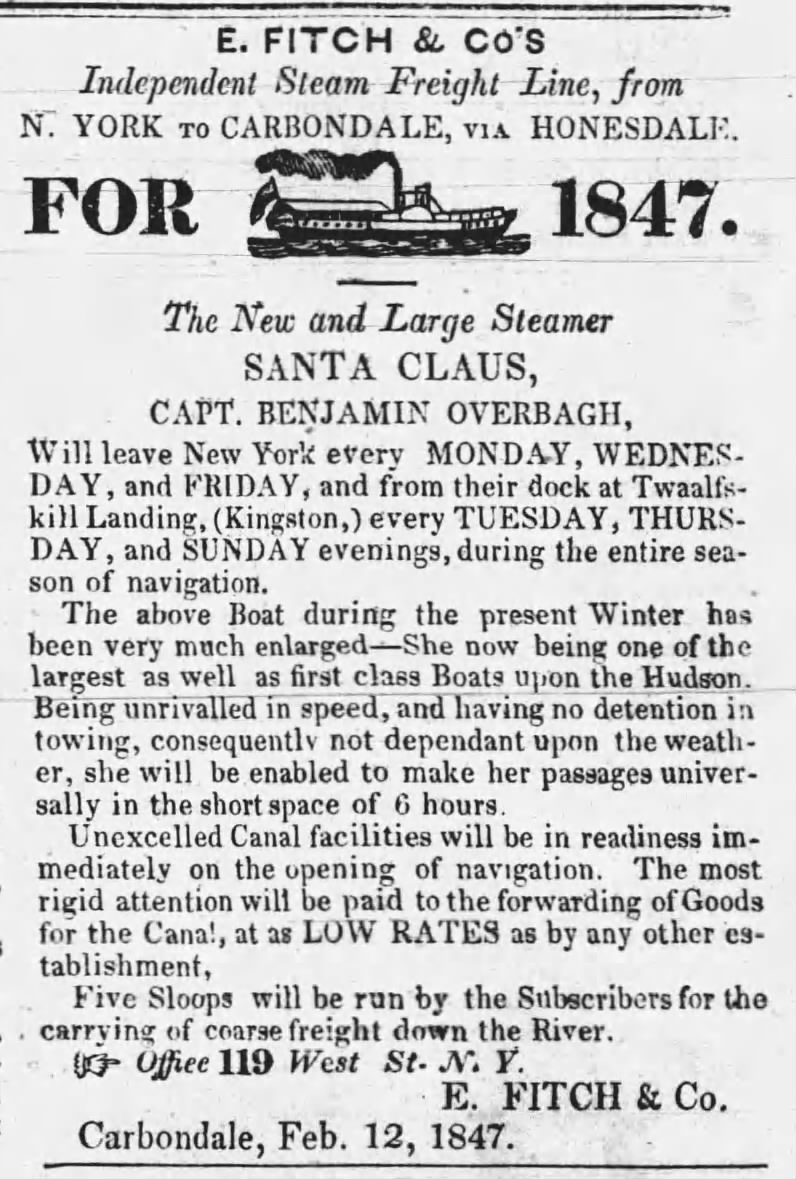
1847 E. Fitch & Co. advertisement for the services of Santa Claus

Following the termination of the daily service from Wilbur in early 1846, Santa Claus was placed by Fitch under the management of the People's Line, for operation as a night boat between Albany and New York.

On a southbound trip from Albany in bad weather on the night of June 5, 1846, Santa Claus was involved in a collision with the Philadelphia-bound iron-hulled screw steamer Ocean. The accident tore away one of Santa Claus's paddle boxes and damaged the paddlewheel, and her black barber, who had been asleep near the paddle box—probably in the adjacent barber shop—was killed. Ocean was little damaged by the collision, but Santa Claus had to be towed to New York for repairs. In late October, after returning to service, Santa Claus was hailed by the steamer Buffalo, which had just been badly damaged in collision with a sloop, but after momentarily rounding to, Santa Claus continued on her way, leaving it to a later steamer to provide assistance.

During the 1846–1847 off season, Santa Claus was lengthened 24 feet (7.3 m) to 209 feet (64 m). With the opening of the river in March, the steamer returned to the Wilbur – New York route, again running in the evenings excepting Sundays, when she left New York at 7 am. In September, she returned to night boat duty between Albany and New York—this time running in opposition to the People's Line—but maintained her Sunday morning New York–to–Wilbur service. With the addition of Santa Claus to the highly competitive Albany route, fares dropped precipitously to 50 cents (equivalent to $17 in 2025), but after she was withdrawn in October, they quickly rose again to a high of $1.50 ($52).

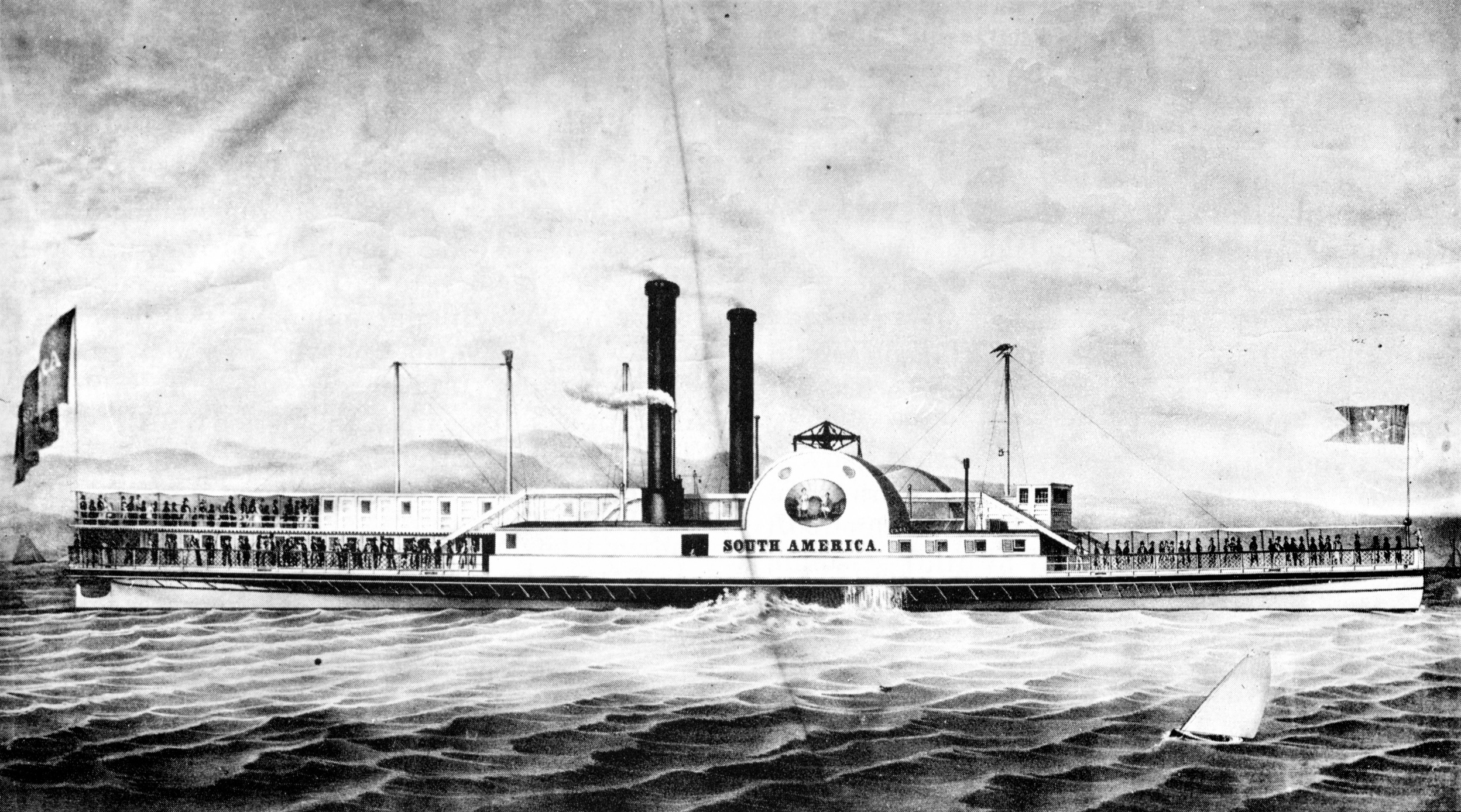
South America was Santa Claus's running mate to Albany in late 1848

Santa Claus spent the entire 1848 season as a night boat on the New York – Albany route, again under the management of the People's Line, running on alternate nights in partnership with the steamer North America and later the South America. She was also used on occasion as an excursion boat. The steamer's operations in 1849, if any, are not known, but near the opening of the season, a writer for a Poughkeepsie newspaper expressed the hope that "we may not again be afflicted with such craft as the Santa Claus or Admiral", indicating that the former—still barely four years old—had already lost favor with the public. Little is known about the steamer's movements in 1850, but in mid-year she was still operating on the Albany route, where the competition had grown so fierce that "the fare ranges from fifty cents down to nothing". She also continued in the excursion trade, advertising her availability for quadrille parties in August.

In 1851, the steamer was again running as a night boat between New York and Albany, this time as an "Opposition Boat". while Sundays were reserved for day trips to Kingston. From June, she appears to have switched her outward-bound destination to Poughkeepsie, the trip incorporating a large number of way-landings including Newburgh.

In April 1852, Fitch attempted to sell his steamboat, but was unsuccessful at this time. The following month, Santa Claus was advertised to run on "her regular route" from New York to Newburgh, but a few days later, began running direct to Albany instead, the fare having been cut to just 25 cents. On Wednesday, June 30, she made a rare double excursion—a fishing expedition in the morning, and a "grand moonlight excursion and cotilon party" the same evening.

==== Henry Clay funeral cortège, July 1852 ====
On July 5, 1852, Santa Claus had the honor of conveying the remains of distinguished American statesman Henry Clay from New York City to Albany, on their way to his burial place in Lexington Cemetery, Kentucky. As Santa Claus proceeded up the river, other steamers, including the new steamer Henry Clay, named after the statesman, stopped their engines, lowered their flags, tolled their bells and fired minute guns, with Santa Claus echoing their actions, the boats thus drifting solemnly past one another, while passengers doffed their hats. At West Point, the steamer's passing was greeted by the firing of cannon and a salute by a body of cadets, and at Newburgh, the remains were honored by the firing of thirteen minute guns. (Note: The source contradicts itself by stating that the remains reached Albany on the 5th, but were transported there on the 6th. The correct date is the 5th.)

From Albany, Clay's remains were conveyed to Buffalo, New York, where they were taken via torchlight procession to the wharves and placed aboard the steamer Buckeye State to continue their journey.

=== Change of ownership and final years as a passenger steamer, 1853–1855 ===
By 1853, Fitch had reversed his original business strategy, and was employing Santa Claus as a towboat only, running three round trips per week between Rondout and New York. Later that year, he finally found a buyer for the steamer in Thomas Cornell, a man with extensive experience in the towboat business.

As an operator principally of towboats, Cornell might have been expected to add Santa Claus to his towboat fleet, but instead, he decided to return her to passenger service. In order to do so, he first had the steamer repaired and refurbished, which work included the addition of more staterooms. Then in August and September 1853, he organized two excursions for Santa Claus, firstly for three Rondout military companies, and secondly for the local firefighters, with Cornell on both occasions taking great pains to ensure the satisfaction of his clients. With this scheme having garnered the steamer favorable publicity, Cornell then returned Santa Claus to regular passenger service from Rondout, with the steamer leaving the town at 4 pm on Mondays, Wednesdays and Fridays, and returning from New York on alternate days, with a departure time of 5 pm.

In late April 1854, heavy snows caused a major freshet in Rondout Creek, endangering the steamboats harboring there, which attempted to quickly raise steam to get to safety. Santa Claus was unable to maneuver quickly enough, however, and was swept onto the south shore flats. After two days of unsuccessful efforts to extricate the vessel, there seemed no option but to dig her out, but in the early hours of May 2, an exceptionally high tide enabled the steamers James Madison and Mohegan to tow her off, and Santa Claus was back in service the following day. In July, Santa Claus broke a crankshaft and was replaced by the steamer Washington while repairs were effected. Santa Claus was one of the last boats to operate from Rondout that year, making her final trip of the season on December 20, amid severe ice conditions.

Santa Claus resumed service in early March 1855, and in May, her departure time from Rondout was changed to 5 pm. This was to be was the steamer's final year as a passenger vessel, because in the winter of 1855–1856, Cornell purchased a larger steamboat, Manhattan, to replace her in the by now well-established and growing Rondout–to–New York passenger service.

=== Conversion to towboat and later service, 1856–1901 ===
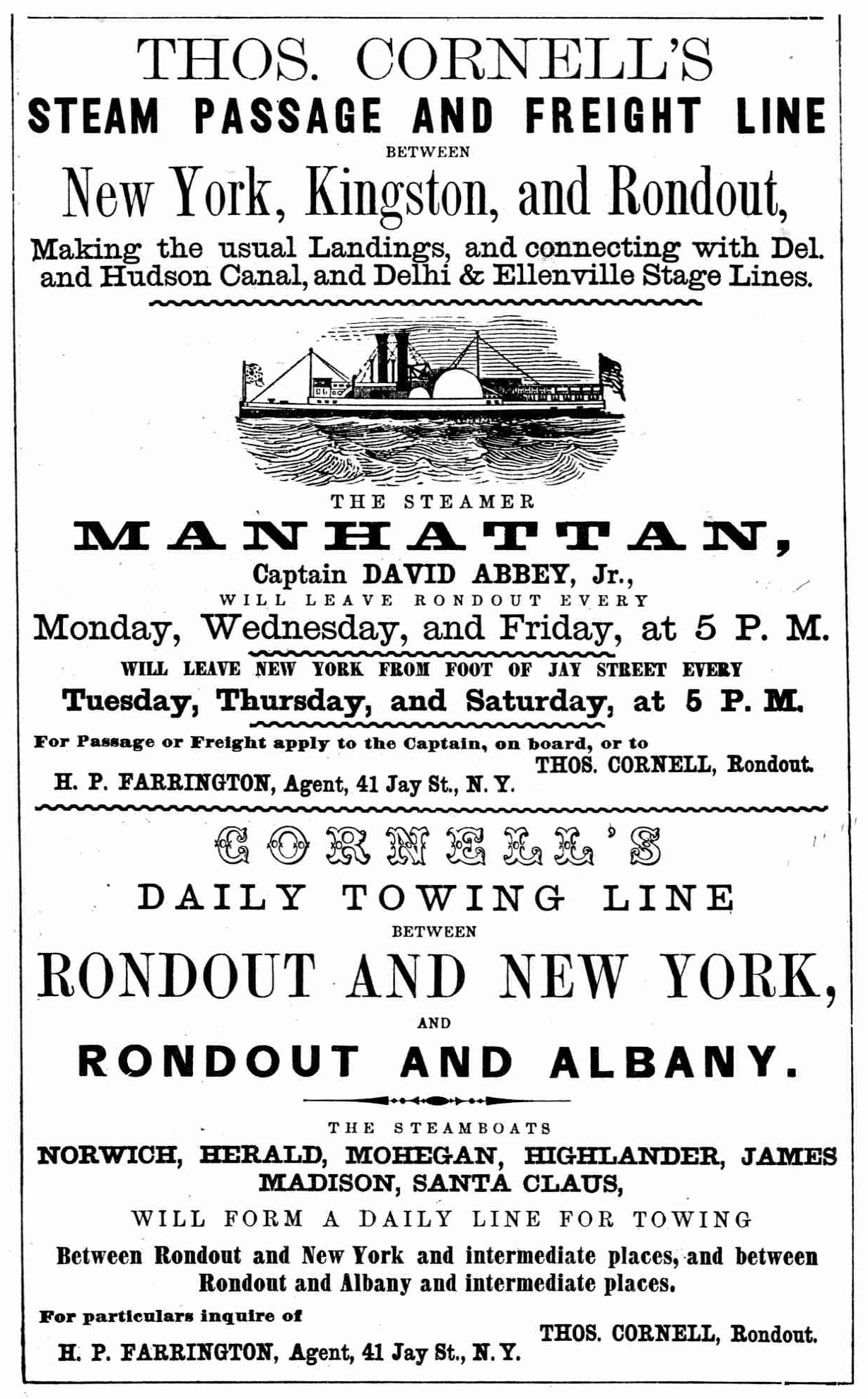
ca. 1861 Cornell company advertisement for the services of Manhattan, the steamer which replaced Santa Claus in Rondout passenger service, and (below) for a number of towboats including Santa Claus

With Manhattan having replaced Santa Claus in the passenger trade, the latter vessel in her current form was now surplus to Cornell's requirements. Cornell accordingly had Santa Claus cut down for towboat service, a process involving the removal of her passenger accommodations, deck houses and other extraneous fittings. She then joined his towboat fleet, and went into operation between Rondout and New York, on which route she would remain until 1868.

On November 25, 1868, Santa Claus collided with and sank the Rondout-based sloop John Jay near Nyack, New York. One man was killed in the incident.

In the winter/spring off-season of 1868–1869, Santa Claus went to the Red Hook, Brooklyn shipyard of James S. Dean, where she was thoroughly overhauled and rebuilt. It was probably at this time that her engine cylinder was enlarged from 42 to 48 inches (120 cm). Her original twin boilers and smokestacks had also by this time been replaced by a single boiler and smokestack midships. After the rebuild, her tonnages were recalculated at 308 gross and 191 net. The name Santa Claus was also finally dispensed with, in favor of the name A. B. Valentine, after the Cornell Steamboat Company's New York agent. The steamer then returned to service as a towboat between Rondout and New York.

In April 1874, A. B. Valentine and another steamer, both with tows, were driven ashore at Newburgh during a heavy storm, but both steamers were returned to service without damage. On December 16, 1886, A. B. Valentine participated in what was thought to be a then-record joint towing force on the Hudson, consisting of nine steamers and seven tugboats, hauling a relatively small number of boats comprising seven barges, five canal boats and two sloops, from Rondout to New York in heavy ice conditions. The following year, after thirty years of towing between Rondout and New York, A. B. Valentine was shifted to the Rondout—Albany route, as she reportedly lacked the power to haul the increasingly large tows, sometimes consisting of 100 boats or more, coming from New York. She would remain on this route to the end of her career.

In December 1901, A. B. Valentine was sold for wrecking to J. H. Gregory of Perth Amboy, New Jersey; by coincidence, her namesake, a fifty-year veteran of the Cornell Steamboat Company, died the same day. A. B. Valentine made her final voyage, to the wrecker's yard, on December 17, 1901, ending a 45-year career as a towboat and a 56-year career overall.

=== Legacy ===
Shortly after Santa Claus began service in 1845, a new hotel sprang up in Wilbur close to the steamer's landing, known as the Santa Claus Hotel; it is thought that the hotel was named after the steamboat. The hotel was demolished in 1971.

While a number of photographs of the A. B. Valentine exist, there are no known images of Santa Claus as originally built. A lithograph of the boat once existed, but evidently no copies have been found. After the steamer's scrapping, her original pilothouse clock was obtained by collector Edwin M. Eldridge. The clock is now held in the collections of the Mariners' Museum and Park of Newport News, Virginia.
