= West Street Foundry =

Steam engine plant in Manhattan, New York

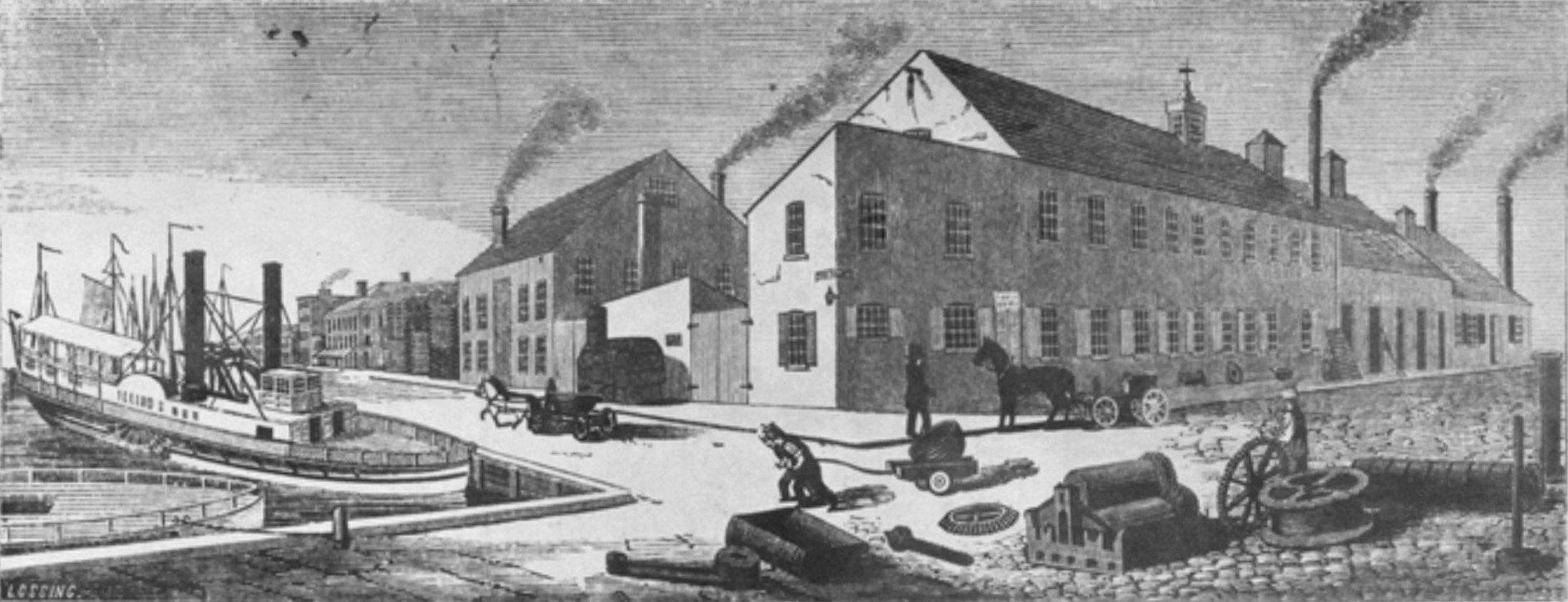
- The West Street Foundry
- Type: Private
- Industry: Engineering
- Founded: ca. 1839
- Founders: Joseph E. Coffee; Maelzaer Howell
- Defunct: 1855
- Fate: Bankrupted
- Headquarters: Manhattan, New York, United States
- Area served: Eastern United States
- Key people: Joseph E. Coffee; Wilson Small
- Products: Marine and stationary steam engines; boilers and general metalwork
- Number of employees: 200 (1851)

The West Street Foundry was an American steam engineering works notable for producing marine steam engines in the mid-19th century. Based in Manhattan, the company built at least 27 marine engines between 1845 and 1855, including engines for some of the fastest and finest steamboats of the era. The company also built and repaired steam engines and boilers of all types, as well as doing other metalwork. The company failed and was liquidated in 1855.

== History ==
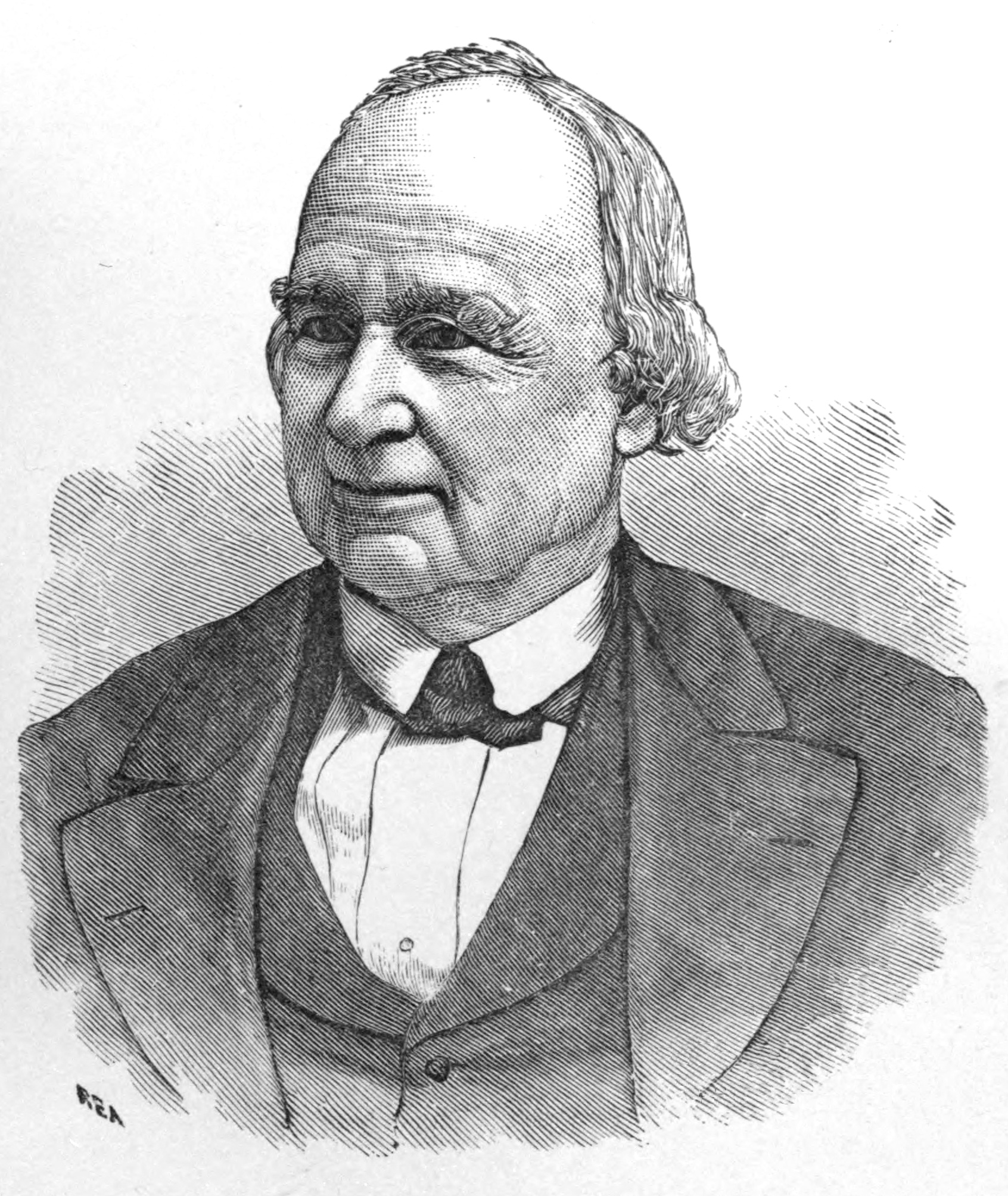
Wilson Small

The earliest known records of the West Street Foundry, also known at this time as Howell & Coffee, date to 1839. Principals of the firm were Joseph E. Coffee, then a 28-year-old engineer, and Maelzaer Howell. With Howell's death in 1842, Coffee became sole proprietor, and would continue his association with the firm throughout its history. Coffee's younger brother, George Wayne Coffee, was also an engineer and an associate of the firm. The business was located on the northeast corner of West and Beach Streets, Manhattan.

In addition to marine engines, the company built stationary steam engines, and built and repaired both marine and stationary boilers as well as doing a variety of other metalwork. The company also bought and sold steamboats on commission, and sometimes offered steamboats in its possession for excursions or charter. The foundry's services were advertised as far afield as Alabama.

By 1850, the company had been acquired by Wilson Small, a prominent figure in the New York branch of the Democratic Party, with Coffee remaining as superintendent and agent. The company had 140 employees in 1850; by 1851 this number had risen to 200.

The foundry is known to have built the engines for at least 27 steam vessels, (Note: See table.) though more are likely unaccounted for. (Note: For example, Small was the original owner of seven steamboats built in Keyport, New Jersey, by Benjamin C. Terry, and Joseph E. Coffee's brother, George Wayne Coffee, also ordered the steamer Joseph E. Coffee (later CSS Winslow) from Terry; the engine builder for none of these steamers is known.) Among the more notable vessels powered by West Street Foundry engines were Santa Claus and Mountaineer—two Hudson River passenger steamboats noted for their speed (Note: Ringwald cites a contemporaneous newspaper report favorably mentioning Santa Claus' speed; according to another such report, Santa Claus and Niagara were the two fastest boats on the New York to Albany route in 1845. The fact that Santa Claus operated for some years on this highly competitive route is further evidence of her speed.)—and State of Maine and Daniel Webster, both considered on debut to be the finest and fastest steamboats in Maine coastal service.

Wilson Small was forced to make an assignment of the business in 1855. (Note: While the reasons for the failure are not known, it coincided with a prolonged shipbuilding slump.) He subsequently joined the civil service, while Coffee established a new steam engineering works in Keyport, New Jersey.

=== About the proprietors ===
Joseph Ellis Coffee was born in Philadelphia on December 27, 1811. After training as an engineer and serving as a principal of the West Street Foundry until its closure, he established a new business offering similar services in Keyport, New Jersey, near the steamboat landing. The location was close to the shipyard of Benjamin C. Terry, with whom Coffee and Small had a longstanding business relationship; Coffee sometimes supervised the construction of steamers at Terry's yard, and Small was the original owner of at least seven vessels built there. In later years, Coffee served as Chief of Bureau of Steam with New York's Metropolitan Police. (Note: Coffee's son, Joseph E. Coffee Jr., was also a police engineer.)

Coffee was a director and later vice-president of the Mechanics' Institute (Note: Not to be confused with the General Society of Mechanics and Tradesmen of the City of New York, later known as the Mechanics' Institute.) of New York, and a director of the Brooklyn Fire Insurance Company. He died December 5, 1869, at the age of 58, and is buried at Green Grove Cemetery, Keyport.

Wilson Small was born in New York City on February 13, 1810. Entering the workforce at the age of twelve, he trained as a jeweller, continuing in the trade until the panic of 1837. A growing engagement with politics led him to stand for political office, and he was elected to the New York State Assembly in 1846 and 1847. (Note: Ridgely gives erroneous dates for Small's election wins.) Later, he served as president of New York City's Tenth Ward. Following the failure of the West Street Foundry, Small joined the civil service, and subsequently obtained a variety of government positions. He was a Sachem and later, the longterm Sagamore of Tammany Hall, and a Grand Master of the Odd Fellows. He died October 21, 1886.

== Production table ==
The following table lists marine steam engines known to have been built by the West Street Foundry; the list is likely incomplete.

Marine steam engines built by the West Street Foundry
Ship							Engine				Ship notes; references
Name (Note: Name=name of ship. Where a ship had more than one name in the course of its career, the later names are presented in chronological order, with each name followed by a two-digit number (in superscript) representing the last two digits of the year in which the rename took place (where known).)	Type (Note: Type of ship. The generic term "steamer" is used when it is not known whether the vessel was a steamship or steamboat.)	Yr. (Note: Year of ship launch where known; otherwise year of completion.)	Builder; (Note: The shipbuilder. Where the shipbuilder is not known, the place where the ship was built, where known, is substituted (in parentheses).)	Tons (Note: Gross register tonnage. Source for most tonnages is the Lytle-Holdcamper List, which provides the original official tonnages. These may differ to some degree from those cited in contemporaneous newspaper reports, as the latter were often estimates made before the official measurement.)	Original owner and/or operator (Note: Original owner and/or operator of the ship or their agent. Contemporaneous newspaper sources rarely state to which category a named party belongs, though other sources may provide clarification. Abbreviations: FC = Ferry Company; SBC = Steamboat Company; SNC = Steam Navigation Company; S&TC = Steamboat & Transportation Company.)	Intended service	Type; (Note: Engine type abbreviations: Ch = crosshead; VB = vertical beam; Inc = inclined.)	#	Cyl. (ins)	Str. (ft)	Ship notes; references
Naushon; Newsboy ^{48}; Naushon ^{51}	Steamboat	1845	W. &. T. Collyer	230	New Bedford & Martha's Vineyard SBC	New England	Ch	1	34	8	New Bedford, MA – Vineyard Haven, 1845–48; mail steamer, New York Harbor, 1848–50; Coney Island ferry, 1850–62; animal carcass transport, NY Harbor, 1862-79; broken up 1880.
Santa Claus; A. B. Valentine ^{69}	Steamboat	1845	W. & T. Collyer	385	E. Fitch & Co.	Hudson River	VB	1	42	10	Fast boat. Kingston/Rondout – New York City and Albany – NYC. Converted to towboat 1855, rebuilt 1869, broken up 1901.
Mountaineer	Steamboat	1846	William H. Brown	513	Isaac Newton	Hudson River	VB	1	54	11	Fast boat. Peekskill – New York City 1846, later NYC – Bridgeport, CT. Stranded and wrecked off Cape Henlopen, Delaware Bay, 1850.
State of Maine; San Pelayo ^{71}	Steamboat	1848	Bishop & Simonson	806	Penobscot SNC	New England	VB	1	54	11	Largest, fastest and finest steamer in Maine coastal service when new. Boston—Bangor, ME, 1848; Fall River, MA—NYC 1849–60; hospital boat, USQMD and US Sanitary Commission, 1861–65; excursion boat, New York, postwar; sold for Cuban service, 1871; subsequent disposition unknown.
George W. Coffee	Steamboat	1848	(Jersey City, NJ)	177	O. B. Hilliard	South Carolina					Built to run from Charleston to Sullivan's Island. Destroyed by fire, 1865.
Niagara	Ferry	1849	Perine, Patterson & Stack	411	Williamsburg FC	East River	VB	1	38	9	(Note: Five ferryboats—Oneota, Onalaska, Niagara, Oneida and Seneca—were built for the Williamsburg Ferry Company in 1849, three of which had engines built by the West Street Foundry and two with engines by George Birbeck Jr. The two ferries with Birbeck engines were Onalaska and Seneca; therefore the three ferries with West Street Foundry engines were Niagara, Oneota and Oneida.) Sold to Erie Railroad, ca. 1860; destroyed by fire in alleged arson attack, 1868.
Oneota	Ferry	1849	Perine, Patterson & Stack	411	Williamsburg FC	East River	VB	1	38	9	Sold to U.S. govt., 1863.
Oneida	Ferry	1849	Perine, Patterson & Stack	313	Williamsburg FC	East River	VB	1	32	8	Abandoned 1876.
A. H. Schultz	Steamboat	1850		164	Wilson Small			1	24	6	
Sea Witch	Steamship	1850			G. W. Coffee	California	VB	1	40	9	
Independence	Steamship	1850	William H. Brown	600	Independent Line	San Francisco		1	42	9	San Francisco – San Juan del Sur, Nicaragua. Wrecked, Santa Margarita Island, Mexico, 1853.
Canada	Ferry	1851	Perine, Patterson & Stack	338	Williamsburg FC	East River	VB	1	32	9	Abandoned, 1876.
Wilson Small	Steamboat	1851	Isaac C. Smith	258		NYC–New Jersey					Sunk in collision with steamer Mary Augusta off Poplar Island, Maryland, 1867, 2–3 killed. Steamer later raised, wreck sold at auction 1867.
Golden Gate	Steamboat	1852	Isaac C. Smith	170	Middletown & Shrewsbury S&TC	NYC–New Jersey		1			Sold USQMD, 1863; returned to merchant service 1867. Out of documentation ca. 1880.
Junior	Steamboat	1852	John Terry	204	Capt. Joe Armstrong	Mobile Bay	VB	1	28	6	Last enrolment 1856.
Underwriter; USS Underwriter ^{61}	Steamship	1852	(Brooklyn, NY)	341				1	48	9	USN gunboat, 1861–64. Captured and burned by Confederate troops, 1864.
	Steamboat	1852			Capt. Baldwin			1	28	7	"Built at Astoria". (Note: The other part of the article can be found at the bottom of the same page, which is at a different url.)
	Steamer	1852						1	32	9	"[F]or parties south".
Cornelia	Steamboat	1853	Isaac C. Smith	250	Wilson Small			1	28	6	
Alice C. Price	Steamboat	1853	W. Collyer	283	Red Bank SBC	NYC–New Jersey		1	32	10	USQMD 1863; sunk by Confederate torpedo (ie mine), St. John's River, Florida, 1864.
Thomas G. Haight	Steamboat	1853	Benjamin C. Terry	256	Red Bank SBC	NYC–New Jersey		1	28	8	NYC – New Jersey, 1853–55; St. John's River, FL, 1855–56; destroyed by fire Savannah, GA, 1856.
Peter G. Coffin; Alexis ^{71}; Riverdale ^{79}	Steamboat	1853	Isaac C. Smith	350		Hudson River	VB	1	34	10	Ran on Hudson River for entire career. Nyack – Albany, later Nyack – NYC. Lengthened 1865, rebuilt and lengthened 1871. Wrecked by boiler explosion, 6+ killed, 1883.
Daniel Webster; Daniel Webster No. 2 ^{62}; Expounder ^{62}; Daniel Webster ^{64}; Saguenay ^{72}	Steamboat	1853	Samuel Sneden	630	Maine SNC	New England	VB	1	52	11	Largest, fastest and finest steamer in Maine coastal service when new. Portland, ME – Bangor, ME, 1853–61. USQMD troop transport and Sanitary Commission hospital boat (intermittently), 1861–65. Boston – Bath, ME, 1864–66. Baltimore, MD – West Point, VA, 1871–72. Excursion boat, Quebec, Canada, 1872–84. Burned and sank, Pointe au Pic, Quebec, Canada, 1884.
	Towboat	1853			Capt. David Cox			1	28	6	
Washington	Ferry	1854	John Crawford (Note: Crawford was a master builder at Benjamin C. Terry's shipyard, where the ferry was built.)	435	Peoples FC	Boston	Inc	1	38	9	Boston – E. Boston, 1854–62. Lengthened and rebuilt 1864 and readmeasured at 618 tons. Cleared New York for Shanghai, China, in 1864 but sold instead at Rio de Janeiro; subsequent disposition unknown.
John Adams	Ferry	1854	Benjamin C. Terry	465	Peoples FC	Boston					Boston – E. Boston, 1854–62; US Army transport, 1862–65; returned to merchant service, Boston – E. Boston, 1867–76; Hudson River etc. service, 1876–88; destroyed by fire, Port Richmond, NY, 1889.
Jefferson	Ferry	1854	Joseph Beers (Note: Beers was a master builder at Benjamin C. Terry's shipyard, where the ferry was built.)	443	Peoples FC	Boston					Boston – E. Boston, 1854–64; USQMD 1864–65; returned to merchant service, Boston – E. Boston, 1867–74; converted to barge, 1874; struck and sank 1877.
