= John Wolcott Adams =

American illustrator

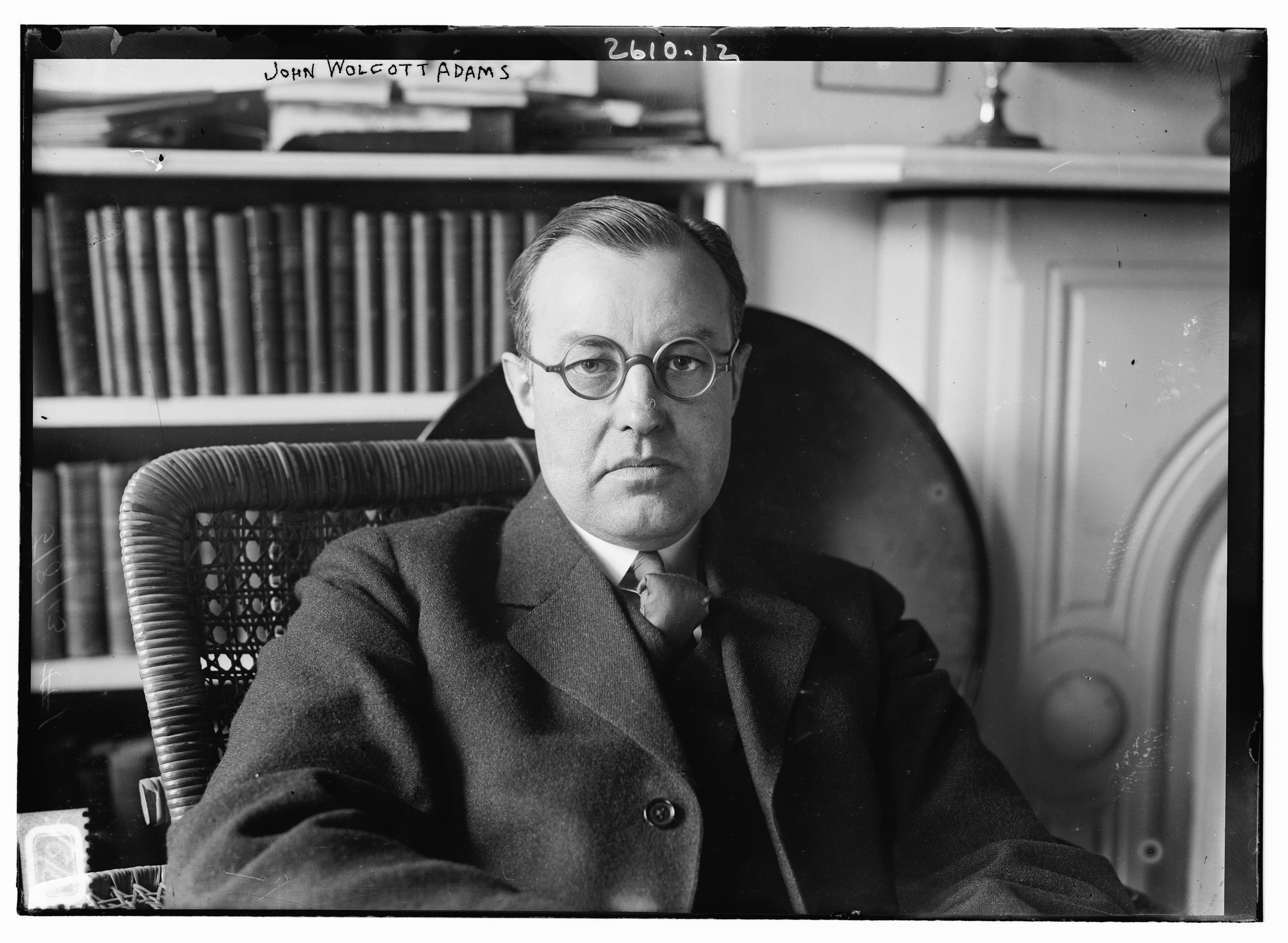
- Born: October 7, 1874; Worcester, Massachusetts, US
- Died: June 24, 1925 (aged 50); New York, US
- Education: School of the Museum of Fine Arts; Art Students League of New York
- Occupation: Illustrator

John Wolcott Adams (1874–1925) was an American illustrator.

== Biography ==
Adams was born on 7 November 1874 in Worcester, Massachusetts.

He married Frances Pendleton Sheldon (1903–1920).

He was the son of John Francis and Ellen Wilson Adams, and a descendant of a New England family. This family had produced two United States presidents.

Adams was interested in the theatre, and he was able to design at least one stage setting that was designed for a 1923 Walter Hampden production.

He died in New York on June 24, 1925, of appendicitis.

== Education ==
Adams studied at the School of the Museum of Fine Arts in Boston. In 1898, he went to New York, where he attended the Art Students League of New York classes.

== Groups ==
Adams was a member of the following groups:

- The Players
- The Dutch Treat Club
- The Society of Illustrators

== Works ==
Adams contributed to the following periodicals:

- Everybody's Success
- Youth's Companion
- Saturday Evening Post
- Delineator
- Collier's

In 1916, Adams, with Isaac Newton Phelps Stokes, produced a colorful redraft of the 1660 Castello Plan map of New York City.
