= USS Anacostia (1856) =

Gunboat of the United States Navy

History

United States
- Namesake: Anacostia River
- Ordered: as M. W. Chapin, a merchant tugboat
- Laid down: 1856
- Launched: 1856
- Acquired: 1859
- Commissioned: May 1859
- Decommissioned: 12 June 1865
- Stricken: 1865
- Homeport: Washington Navy Yard
- Fate: Burned, 22 March 1868

General characteristics
- Displacement: 217 tons
- Length: 129 ft (39 m)
- Beam: 23 ft (7.0 m)
- Draft: 5 ft (1.5 m)
- Propulsion: steam engine, screw
- Speed: 6.5 knots (12.0 km/h; 7.5 mph)
- Complement: 67
- Armament: two 9" Dahlgren smoothbore guns

USS Anacostia was a steamer, constructed as a tugboat, that was first chartered by the United States Navy for service during the Paraguay crisis of the 1850s and then commissioned as a U.S. Navy ship. She later served prominently in the Union Navy during the American Civil War.

== Under charter to the Navy as M. W. Chapin ==
Anacostia—a screw steamer built at Philadelphia, Pennsylvania, in 1856 as M. W. Chapin—originally operated out of Middletown, Connecticut, as a merchant tug. During subsequent service as a canal boat, the vessel caught the eye of the Federal Government which chartered her sometime in September 1858—quite possibly on the 13th of that month—for its forthcoming expedition to South American waters.

== Problems with Paraguay ==
The historically cordial relations between Paraguay and the United States had soured in the summer and autumn of 1854 when the American consul, Edward A. Hopkins, fell out of the favor of Paraguay's Permanent President, Carlos Antonio López. Their growing animosity prompted the dictator to turn against the continuation of surveying operations—which he had previously heartily endorsed—then being conducted in the tributaries of the Rio de la Plata by the American Navy's side-wheel steamer, USS Water Witch (1851).

The hostility reached a climax on 1 February 1855 when Paraguayan batteries at Itapiru—a brick fortress on the northern bank of the Upper Paraná River—opened fire upon that small American warship, hitting her 10 times and killing her helmsman. Prolonged, but fruitless, efforts seeking redress through diplomatic measures ensued. Finally, on 9 September 1858, President James Buchanan turned the matter over to James B. Bowlin, a former congressman from Missouri, and sent him to Paraguay to obtain satisfaction.

To lend credibility and force to Bowlin's demands, the President ordered the Navy to establish a force which could compel compliance. However, only a couple of sailing ships were then assigned to the Brazil station; and few light-draft, naval steamers were available elsewhere. To fill this need, the Navy chartered seven steam-propelled merchant ships for the expedition. Among these vessels was M. W. Chapin which, like her sisters, had been chosen because of her ability to negotiate shallow, tortuous, and rapidly flowing, waters far from the sea.

The expedition – commanded by Flag Officer William B. Shubrick – departed New York on 17 October; but, for the most part, its 19 ships proceeded southward independently. Under the command of Lt. William Ronckendorff, M. W. Chapin – the smallest of the vessels and the last to reach the mouth of the Rio de la Plata – arrived at Montevideo, Uruguay, on 29 December. The next day, all but two of the shallow-draft ships began their ascent of the river toward Paraguay. Steam launches manned by volunteers from the deep-draft ships joined them for the voyage upriver. Upon reaching Rosario, Water Witch and USS Fulton (1837) left their companions behind and continued on to Asunción, Paraguay, with Bowlin and Shubrick. They reached the Paraguayan capital on 25 January 1859. A fortnight's negotiations—aided by the knowledge that the balance of Shubrick's force was nearby ready to launch offensive operations should such measures be needed—resolved the disputes to Bowlin's satisfaction, and the two American steamers headed downriver on 10 February. Meanwhile, M. W. Chapin and USS Metacomet (1854) had acted as dispatch boats maintaining communications between the large ships at Montevideo, Uruguay, and the smaller ones upstream.

Upon the successful completion of their mission to South America, the ships not assigned to the Brazil Squadron returned home where the Navy exercised its purchase option by buying all seven of the chartered steamers. No document giving the exact date of M. W. Chapin's transfer of title has been found; but the sale probably took place on, or sometime soon after, 27 May 1859, the day of the ship's last log entry under her original name.

== M. W. Chapin becomes the USS Anacostia ==
The first volumes of the steamer's logs under the name Anacostia—which she received upon becoming Navy property or soon thereafter—have been lost. In any case, we know that the vessel was assigned to the Washington Navy Yard—located on the north bank of the river which gave the ship her Navy name. She was still serving there as a tender when the election of Abraham Lincoln to the Presidency on 6 November 1860 precipitated the secession crisis and set the United States on an inexorable course toward civil war.

== Fears for the defense of Washington, D.C. ==
A strong air of expectancy in the National Capital is normal during the months between a President's election and his ensuing inauguration. But, in this instance, the withdrawal of cotton-belt states from the Union greatly intensified the customary disquiet and transmuted into it a deep and widespread anxiety concerning the safety of the city.

Washington's location on the river separating the Southern states of Maryland and Virginia prompted fears that Confederate sympathizers might attempt to prevent Lincoln's inauguration and try to take possession of the city. Thus, as early as 8 January 1861, the commandant of the Washington Navy Yard, Capt. Franklin Buchanan, warned Comdr. John A. Dahlgren, the head of the Bureau of Ordnance, that a mob might ". . . attempt to possess themselves of this yard between now and the 4th of March next for the purpose of securing the arms and ammunition now in the armory and magazine, to be used in preventing the inauguration of Mr. Lincoln . . . ."To prepare to deal with that extremity, or with other similar emergencies which might arise, Anacostia -- commanded by Lt. Thomas Scott Fillebrown -- was ". . . kept in readiness ... to receive on board the powder from the main magazine . . . ." Buchanan also stated that he would ". . . require all . . . under my command to defend it [the yard] to the last extremity." The apprehension of an impending attack continued to grow. On 1 February Buchanan issued a general order assigning the officers under his command various parts of the yard to defend. Lt. Fillebrown of Anacostia was given responsibility for fighting off anyone threatening ". . . the lower part of the yard."

== Civil War ==
=== Fort Sumter surrenders and Virginia secedes ===
Although the feared attacks did not occur when Lincoln took office, tension continued to grow in the weeks that followed; and the tempo of ominous events accelerated after the surrender of Fort Sumter. On 15 April, Lincoln issued a proclamation declaring that an insurrection existed and calling forth ". . . the militia of the several states of the Union . . ."to restore Federal authority. His action aroused bitter resentment along the border between the North and the South. Two days later, the Virginia State Convention voted to secede. On the 19th, the President declared a blockade of the Confederate States. That same day, Secretary of the Navy, Gideon Welles -- fearing that Virginians would capture the Norfolk Navy Yard -- ordered Anacostia to receive on board incendiary material and explosives and to take them to Norfolk, Virginia, so that, if necessary, the commandant of the navy yard there might destroy all public property within his command to prevent ". . . its falling into the hands of lawless persons."

However, before Anacostia had finished taking on her highly combustible cargo, USS Pawnee returned from her futile relief expedition to Charleston Harbor. Since she was larger, that screw sloop was capable of carrying more cargo than Anacostia; and, since her engines were far more powerful, she was better able to tow warships then under repair out of the threatened, and soon-to-be-abandoned, Norfolk Navy Yard. Pawnee's advantages prompted Secretary of the Navy, Gideon Welles, to order her to go to Norfolk in place of Anacostia. The latter steamer quickly transferred her inflammable cargo and her pilot to the larger vessel which then sped to Hampton Roads.

=== Potomac River ===
==== Fear of losing Baltimore underscores need to keep Potomac open ====
Meanwhile, another crisis threatened immediate harm to the Union. In Baltimore, Maryland, on that same day, 19 April, a violently pro-Southern mob attacked the 6th Massachusetts Regiment as it was moving between railroad stations during its trip to Washington to defend the Federal Capital. This serious threat to lines of communications and supply linking Washington with the North by rail underscored the importance of keeping the Potomac open to Federal shipping.

==== Anacostia positions herself on the Potomac ====
As a result, Anacostia headed down the Potomac River to learn of any obstruction which Confederates might have placed in the channel; to look for signs of any Southern efforts to erect batteries along the banks of the river; and, if possible, to destroy any fortifications discovered. To assist her in carrying out the latter mission, she embarked a guard of 20 United States Marines before getting underway.

Since Fillebrown needed a pilot to descend the river below Cedar Point safely, he reversed course upon reaching that place, lest his ship run aground and fall into enemy hands. During her homeward passage, Anacostia escorted two vessels: the steamer Jerome; carrying 144 barrels of gunpowder along with". . . other stores for the Government . . ."and". . . a large schooner laden with cement and other matter for the United States Capitol" which was then being enlarged. Upon reaching Washington, Fillebrown reported that he had found neither channel obstructions nor evidence of shore batteries. He went on to ask that ". . . at least one other responsible officer be ordered to this vessel as the constant and unremitting attention that is necessary to the proper execution of my orders is more than nature will stand. I have not laid myself down since Thursday [five days before] night." No records tell us whether or not Fillebrown received the needed help. In any case, Anacostia soon resumed her patrolling of the Potomac and stuck to the task through the early weeks of the war.

==== Anacostia discovers batteries being built on the Virginia shore ====
Anacostia would typically depart the Washington Navy Yard and carefully observe both banks as she proceeded downstream. Occasionally, she ventured all the way to Point Lookout, Maryland; but usually reversed course before reaching the mouth of the Potomac and steamed back to the navy yard where she replenished her bunkers with coal and quickly began another cycle.

During one of his ship's reconnaissance runs downriver in mid-May, Fillebrown learned from the side-wheeler Mount Vernon that Confederate forces had emplaced cannon at the mouth of Aquia Creek. Disturbed at this intelligence, he immediately headed Anacostia back to Washington to report the discovery.

The news presented Lincoln—already overburdened by many other highly dangerous problems—with an extremely exasperating dilemma. If he ordered Federal forces to attack the fortifications which were going up on the southern bank of the Potomac, he would assuredly offend many still loyal, but wavering, Virginians and would influence them to vote to withdraw from the Union in the forthcoming plebiscite on their state convention's ordinance of secession. On the other hand, if he did not move against the new batteries before they had been completed and strengthened, he would place Union use of the Potomac—and thus the National Capital and the whole Union cause—in grave jeopardy. Temporizing, the President decided to leave all Virginia territory—riverside guns notwithstanding—inviolate until the people of that state had spoken. For the time being, no action would be taken against the ordnance threatening Washington's waterborne communication with the rest of the world.

==== Navigational aids on the Potomac appear sabotaged ====
To make matters worse, the riverside batteries were not the only hazards facing Union shipping on the Potomac. Southern agents had removed the buoys and other navigational aids from the river. To counter this threat, the Navy selected Lt. Thomas Phelps to make a new survey of the Potomac. As he carried out this work, Anacostia and USS Philadelphia shared the task of carrying him upstream and downstream while he made the observations needed to prepare new charts showing permanent landmarks ashore—which could be neither moved nor removed— rather than movable markers in the water. These new maps made it possible for navigators to keep their vessels safely in the channel as they operated between Washington and Point Lookout.

==== Arlington and Alexandria, Virginia, occupied by Federal troops ====
The immunity from Federal attack at first enjoyed by Confederate forces in Virginia ended abruptly on 23 May, when the citizens of the Old Dominion overwhelmingly endorsed secession. After losing this critical plebiscite, the Lincoln Government wasted no time in moving to check the growing threat to the National Capital from the south bank of the Potomac. That very night, troops left Washington and occupied Arlington and Alexandria, Virginia. Some subsequent studies state that Anacostia joined USS Thomas Freeborn and USS Resolute in carrying the Union occupation forces to Alexandria and in covering their landings. However, no contemporary documents supporting her participation in the operation have been found. Moreover, it seems unlikely that Anacostia took part since she departed the Washington Navy Yard that morning and headed for the mouth of the Potomac to escort the steamer Sea Gull back to the capital. They arrived there on the night of the 27th.

Letter from artist and member of the 7th NY Regiment Sanford R. Gifford, dated 2 May 1861. Written on stationery of the United States House of Representatives. "In the morning the Anacosta (sic) conveyed us to the Navy Yard at Washington – At Alexandria a large Secession flag floated over the City, and the wharves were lined with people, but there was no demonstration. Soon after our arrival the President and Sec. of State came on board and we were all personally presented – Both President and Secretary were in a jolly good humor and complimented us for having opened the Potomac."

Soon after reaching home, Anacostia welcomed on board Lt. Napoleon Collins who relieved Lt. Fillebrown in command. While she was at the navy yard, she also exchanged her Marine Corps guard for one composed of soldiers from the 71st New York Regiment.

==== The Potomac Flotilla is established ====
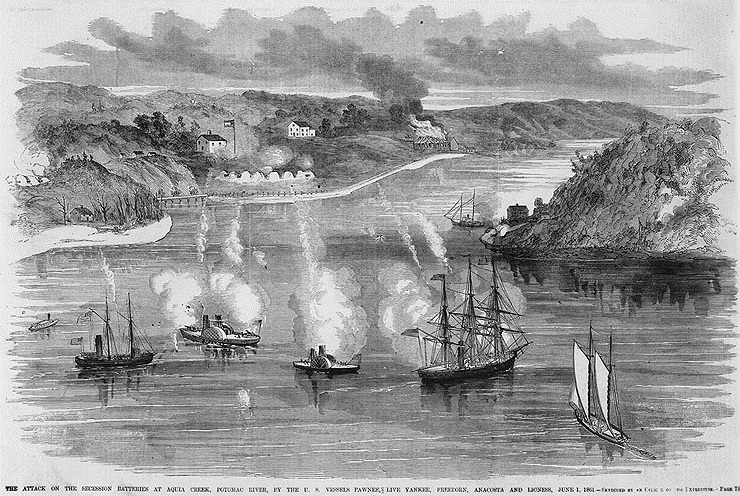
Anacostia at the attack on the Confederate Batteries at Aquia Creek, 1 June 1861

Three days later, the steamer again moved downriver, first to Nanjemoy Creek to communicate with Comdr. James Harmon Ward, the commanding officer of the recently established Potomac Flotilla, and then to enforce the blockade of the Virginia shore further below. Anacostia met Thomas Freeborn, the flotilla's flagship, on the morning of 31 May, just as Ward was preparing to resume shelling the new Southern works at the mouth of Aquia Creek. During the bombardment, she added her guns to those of Freeborn and Resolute. At least two of Anacostia's shells exploded within the battery and did considerable material damage; but, unaccountably, wounded no one.

Confederate counterbattery fire struck Ward's ships several times, but wounded only one man and did no serious material damage. That evening the Union steamers withdrew a few miles downstream where they were reinforced by USS Pawnee (1859).

The next day, the Federal warships moved back upriver to a point just off the mouth of Aquia Creek and again opened fire. In compliance with Ward's orders, Anacostia and Resolute did not join in the cannonade, but remained just out of range of the Confederate artillery so that they would be ready to tow any of their consorts out of danger in the event one or both became disabled during the engagement. In the course of the five-hour action, many rounds from ashore did strike both Thomas Freeborn and Pawnee, causing Ward to return to Washington in the former for repairs and replenishment. Anacostia also headed back to the navy yard where she arrived on the evening of 1 June.

=== Assigned temporary duty at Fort Monroe ===
A few days later, while she was inspecting shipping in the Potomac, the steamer received orders sending her to Fort Monroe to relieve the tug, USS Young America, which needed repairs. She arrived in Hampton Roads on the 7th and served in that strategic harbor supporting the blockade through the first three weeks of August and then returned to Washington for yard work which she also needed.

=== Anacostia returns to Potomac River guard duty ===
When again ready for action, she resumed patrol duty on the Potomac. From time to time during the following months, the ship shelled Confederate forces along the Virginia shore. On 8 December 1861, she and USS Jacob Bell fired on Southern troops near Freestone Point. After the bombardment had driven off the Confederate soldiers, a party from the steamers landed there and burned down several buildings. Then, on 31 January 1862, Anacostia and USS Yankee engaged cannon at Cockpit Point, dismounting at least one Southern gun and silencing the battery. The ships returned to that place on 9 March—the day of the historic battle at Hampton Roads between CSS Virginia, the raised and rebuilt Merrimack and USS Monitor—but found the Southern positions deserted. Parties from the Union warship then landed and spiked the abandoned guns. Later that day, the same raiders destroyed Confederate batteries at Evansport, Virginia.

=== Supporting General McClellan's operations ===
About this time, General George B. McClellan was making final preparations for moving the Army of the Potomac from its positions in Northern Virginia to the tip of the peninsula formed by the James and York Rivers to launch a new drive toward Richmond, Virginia, from that quarter. Anacostia's next assignment took her back and forth between Washington and Hampton Roads on runs escorting Army transports carrying McCellan's troops to Fort Monroe for the impending campaign. When she had completed that duty, the ship turned her attention to reconnaissance work along the lower western shore of the Chesapeake Bay in the Piankatank River; Mobjack Bay; and, especially, the York River which the Yankee Army was then using as its line of supply during its push up the peninsula. In response to a request from McClellan". . . to annoy the enemy . . ."she shelled both Gloucester, Virginia, and Yorktown, Virginia on the night of 15 and 16 April.

Following this action, Anacostia headed back up Chesapeake Bay and, on the 20th, assisted other vessels of the Potomac Flotilla in capturing the steamer Eureka in the Rappahannock River. She took another prize early in June when she caught the sloop Monitor while that Southern sailing ship was attempting to escape from the Piankatank River. About this time, a party from Anacostia ventured several miles inland to recapture the reflectors which had been taken from one of the Chesapeake Bay light boats.

Late in June, General Robert E. Lee's Army of Northern Virginia turned back McClellan's thrust toward Richmond, Virginia, and forced the Union general to shift his base from the York to the James. The Union reverses on the peninsula prompted Washington to bring Major General Ambrose Burnside's troops from the Carolinas to Northern Virginia where they could join John Pope's Army in defending Washington. Anacostia in turn was ordered up the Rappahannock to keep in touch with Burnside. Burning wood for want of coal, she arrived at Fredericksburg, Virginia, on 14 July and remained there subject to Burnside's orders.

=== Anacostia's raid on Port Royal, Virginia ===
A month later, in response to intelligence from the general that clandestine lines of communication between Baltimore and Richmond passed through Port Royal, Virginia, some 35 miles below Fredericksburg, Virginia, a party from Anacostia boarded the ferry at Cooper's Point and dropped downriver to that port. There, they arrested two groups of recruits going South from Maryland to join the Confederate Army. They also destroyed both the ferry that the Southerners used to cross the river and a number of other craft that were potentially useful to the Confederate cause. About a fortnight later, another party from Anacostia returned to Port Royal and captured another group of recruits and the officers who were in charge of them.

=== Anacostia called back to Washington after Union loss at Bull Run ===
On the day Acting Master Nelson Provost, who had relieved Collins in command of Anacostia, reported the latter raid, Lee's army launched an offensive which routed Union troops in the Second Battle of Bull Run and seriously threatened Washington. As a result, Burnside asked Anacostia to return to the Potomac and wired Washington for more naval help. "I ought to have more gunboats here. It is an absolute necessity."

In response, Anacostia blew up the bridges across the Rappahannock River, set fire to a sloop, and headed downstream from Fredericksburg. When she was still some 20 miles from the mouth of the Potomac, her engine broke down and, instead of taking station off the mouth of Aquia Creek, she had to go all the way upriver to Washington for repairs. The ensuing overhaul kept the ship inactive during the naval alert attendant upon the Battle of Antietam and through mid-October.

=== Anacostia raids St. George's Island ===
Upon the completion of this yard work, the steamer dropped downstream and took station off Piney Point, Maryland., where she could observe shipping entering and leaving the Potomac River and could interrupt traffic across the river between Maryland and Virginia. In mid-November, Provost led a boat expedition to St. George's Island and captured several Southern smugglers, two canoes, and "... a quantity of contraband goods."

About a week later, the ship—accompanied by four other ships of the flotilla—returned to the Rappahannock River behind which Burnside, who had relieved McClellan in command of the Army of the Potomac, was assembling forces in a position to protect Washington while pushing toward Richmond. However, the low level of the tidal water slowed the Union gunboats' progress up that river and stopped their ascent at Port Royal before dawn on the 27th. At that point, the senior naval officer, Lt. Comdr. Edward P. McCrea reported to Burnside the arrival of his ships and asked for instructions. On the afternoon of 4 December, Southern field artillery opened fire on Anacostia and three other Union ships, beginning a series of engagements which continued until Burnside's Army—which had crossed the Rappahannock on the 12th—was defeated in the Battle of Fredericksburg on the 13th.

Burnside's beaten troops retired eastward across the river on the night of the 14th and 15th. Nevertheless, Anacostia remained in the Rappahannock for more than a week thereafter, observing the activities of Lee's troops. On the 23d, she stood downstream to return to the Potomac.

=== Subsequent operations on the Potomac River ===
The steamer's subsequent movements were somewhat less tied to Army operations. During the ensuing two and one-half years, she primarily plied the waters of the lower Potomac and its tributaries, occasionally leaving that river for brief missions which took her from its mouth south along the western shore of the Chesapeake and up the other streams which flow into that bay, especially the Rappahannock and the Piankatank Rivers.

On 28 December 1862, she captured the schooner Exchange in the Rappahannock. From time to time, parties from the ship went ashore in Confederate territory and captured men, materiel, and equipment. For instance, acting on an intelligence report from the Army, parties from Anacostia and USS Currituck landed at Indian Creek, Virginia, on 3 April 1863 to find a large quantity of smuggled medical supplies. They arrived after the drugs had been shipped on to Richmond, but did manage to capture a large quantity of tobacco.

On other occasions, she gathered information for the Northern Army. This was the case during a trip up the Rappahannock with USS Dragon about a fortnight before the Battle of Chancellorsville.

Similar instances abound. Taken individually, these operations were, for the most part, of little significance. Yet, Anacostia's labors, combined with the countless like efforts of her sister ships in the Union Navy to exact a growing and enervating toll on the South's steadily shrinking ability to fight.

On 21 May, Anacostia, USS Currituck, and USS Satellite took the schooner Emily on the Rappahannock about 10 miles above Urbana, Virginia. On 1 June, she helped to cover Kilpatrick's cavalry brigade as if crossed the Rappahannock. The next day, she and USS Primrose captured the sloop Flying Cloud. On 16 July in Herring Creek, Maryland, she took and destroyed a canoe and captured the men who had just crossed the Potomac in it to purchase goods needed by the South.

On 7 November 1864 near Aquia Creek, a party from Anacostia destroyed two wagons which had been used to convey blockade goods from that place to Fredericksburg. Two days later, another group of her sailors ascended Chopawamsic Creek where they burned the sloop Buckskin.

=== Final months of the war ===
During the final months of the Civil War, Anacostia encountered steadily decreasing Southern activity. However, the fear and tension following Lincoln's assassination in mid-April gave increased purpose and excitement to her last weeks of duty as her crew remained alert for any conspirators who might attempt to escape down or across the Potomac.

== End-of-war decommissioning ==
Following the complete collapse of the Confederacy, the steamer was decommissioned at the Washington Navy Yard on 12 June 1865. She was sold at public auction there on 20 July 1865 to a Mr. Clyde and was redocumented as Alexandria on 26 December 1865. She subsequently served in the Chesapeake Bay area until destroyed by fire at City Point, Virginia, on 22 March 1868.
