= USS Satellite (1854) =

American naval ship

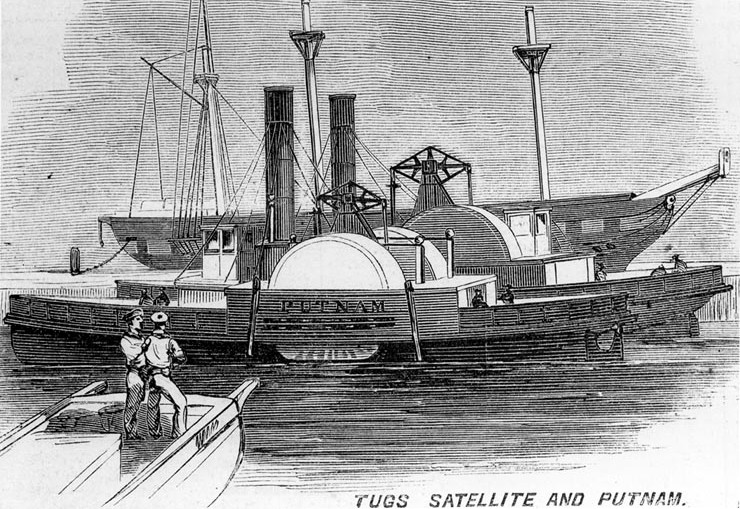
- Tugs Putnam (foreground) and Satellite 1861.

History

United States
- Launched: 1854
- Acquired: 24 July 1861
- Commissioned: 12 September 1861; at the New York Navy Yard
- Captured: 23 August 1863
- Fate: Destroyed by Confederate forces 28 August 1863

General characteristics
- Displacement: 217 tons
- Length: 120 ft 7 in (36.75 m)
- Beam: 22 ft 9 in (6.93 m)
- Draft: 8 ft 6 in (2.59 m)
- Propulsion: steam engine; side wheel propelled
- Complement: 43 officers and enlisted
- Armament: 2 × 8 in (203 mm) guns

USS Satellite was a large, steam-powered large tugboat, acquired by the Union Navy during the American Civil War and equipped with two powerful 8-inch guns. She was assigned to the Union blockade of the Confederate States of America.

She served the Union Navy well, until captured and destroyed by Confederate forces.

== Service history ==
The first ship to be named Satellite by the Navy, Satellite was a wooden, side-wheel tug built at New York City in 1854, was purchased by the Navy at New York on 24 July 1861; and commissioned at the New York Navy Yard on 12 September 1861, Acting Master Joseph Spinney in command. The next day, the ship sailed for the Potomac River and reached the Washington Navy Yard on the 16th. That afternoon, she steamed back down river to join the Potomac River Flotilla off the mouth of Occoquan Creek and began almost two years of operations in the roughly parallel rivers which drain tidewater Virginia and empty into the Chesapeake Bay. Her first action came on 25 September when she was fired upon by a Confederate battery at Freestone Point; but, during the action, she suffered no casualties or damage. From that time on, her duels with artillery and riflemen hidden along the shores were frequent. On 18 October, the tug bombarded Confederate positions at Shipping Point, Virginia.

On 15 November, a boat from the ship rowed down stream on a scouting expedition and returned before the following dawn with two scows and three skiffs as prizes. Two days later, Satellite shelled positions below Boyd's Hole. On 7 December, four shells fired from Shipping Point passed over her deck between her pilot house and wheels. On the 22d, the sound of artillery from Boyd's Hole drew the ship downstream to investigate. She found a Union merchant schooner which had been disabled by the cannonade and, while assisting the damaged ship, came under fire herself. Two shells hit Satellite's wheel house without causing casualties or serious damage, and Satellite replied in kind, silencing her adversaries. Similar action enlivened her service in the following months. Her log records three engagements in January 1862, one in February, and eight in March. On 15 February, after a shell exploded in USS Harriet Lane's paddle box, disabling her as she passed Shipping Point, Satellite assisted the damaged revenue cutter.

On 13 April, with the other ships of the 2d Division of the Potomac Flotilla, Satellite sailed for the Rappahannock River, under presidential orders, to gather intelligence on Southern forces in the area, and to neutralize any threat from that quarter to General George B. McClellan's army which was then fighting up the peninsula, between the James and York rivers, toward Richmond. The next day, the Union ships shelled fortifications along the shore and landed boat parties to destroy Fort Lowry which Southern troops had abandoned. During their operations, the gunboats ascended the river to Tappahannock, Virginia. On 20 April, Satellite and USS Island Belle captured sloop, Reindeer, and schooners, Sarah Ann and Sabine, all of Tappahannock. In May, Satellite returned to the Potomac River. On the 26th, while the ship was being repaired at the Washington Navy Yard, most of her crew traveled to Harper's Ferry, Virginia, to help defend that strategic post which was threatened by General T. J. "Stonewall" Jackson's operations in the Shenandoah Valley.

On 9 June, after repairs had been completed and her crew had returned, Satellite got underway for Fort Monroe to join Union naval forces on the James River in supporting McClellan's drive toward the Confederate capital. Soon after she reached Hampton Roads, Virginia, the tug was ordered to protect a submarine, which, it was hoped, would be able to destroy the railroad bridge across the Appomattox River at Petersburg, Virginia, and to clear the obstructions from the channel of the James below Drewry's Bluff. Satellite accompanied the submarine, which was later named USS Alligator, up the river; but Comdr. John Rodgers, the senior naval officer on the James, felt that the submarine would be unable to perform the underwater demolition missions. The shallowness of the Appomattox, he felt, would prevent her from reaching the bridge submerged; and a surface approach would expose the vulnerable craft to destruction or capture. In Confederate hands, Rodgers feared, the submarine might seriously threaten northern warships. As for the obstructions in the James, Union tugs, Rodgers reasoned, might succeed in pulling the sunken, stone-laden lighters from the channel of the James. However, if the submarine should succeed in destroying the hulks, their cargoes of stone would remain to obstruct navigation and would be almost impossible to remove while covered by Confederate guns. For these reasons, he sent the submarine back to Fort Monroe.

=== Seven Days campaign ===
Satellite remained up river and, on 26 June, entered the Appomattox River in a naval force led by Rodgers. The warships were impeded by musketry and obstructions. Finally, shallow water stopped them too far away from Petersburg to launch a boat attack against the railroad bridge. When efforts to refloat the grounded sidewheeler, Island Belle, proved futile, a party from Satellite stripped the tug and set her afire. Following their return to the James, the gunboats supported General McClellan's army which was then fighting General Robert E. Lee's troops in the bloody Seven Days campaign.

In this series of battles, the Northern soldiers beat their way across the peninsula from the York River to the James where Rodgers' floating firepower could prevent Lee from closing his pincers. After he learned of the disposition of the Federal ships, Lee reported: "As far as I can see there is no way to attack him (McClellan) to advantage; nor do I wish to expose the men to the destructive missiles of his gunboats ... I fear he is too secure under cover of his boats to be driven from his position . . ." During McClellan's retreat to Harrison's Landing, the Union Army's gunboat-protected haven on the James, Satellite and USS Delaware ascended the Chickahominy River to strengthen his right flank. In the ensuing weeks, Satellite protected Union troops ashore and transports afloat, often engaging Confederate forces on the riverbanks. On 27 July, boats from Satellite and USS Yankee ascended Chippoak Creek and captured schooner, J. W. Sturges, and a schooner-rigged lighter laden with wood. They also found two other schooners and a steamer which had been scuttled before they arrived.

In mid-August, after Union leaders had decided to abandon the peninsula, Satellite, USS Galena, and USS Port Royal covered the retirement as McClellan's rear guard withdrew across the Chickahominy toward Fort Monroe. At the end of August, as Lee and Jackson routed a Union army under General Pope in the second Battle of Bull Run, Satellite and a large portion of the James River Flotilla were transferred to the Potomac to help protect the threatened Federal capital and its line of communications by water, the Potomac River. In mid-September, at Antietam Creek, Maryland, Gen. McClellan relieved the pressure on Washington, D.C., when he stopped Lee's thrust into the North and forced the Confederate Army of Northern Virginia to retreat south of the Potomac. Nevertheless, the ships of the Potomac Flotilla were kept in the Potomac to try to stop communication and commerce across the river between Virginia and Southern sympathizers in Maryland. On 30 October, Satellite captured a canoe and five men off the Wicomico River; and, three days later, she took a yawl near Neal's Creek. On 21 November, the side-wheeler returned to the Washington Navy Yard with a number of prisoners who had been arrested for blockade violations.

=== Operations on the Rappahannock ===
On 29 November, as the Union's Army of the Potomac prepared to resume the offensive with a drive through Fredericksburg, Virginia, Satellite departed Washington and headed for the Rappahannock River to help assure the new Northern commander, Major General Ambrose Burnside, control of that river. She remained on the Rappahannock after Lee skillfully parried Burnside's thrust at Fredericksburg in mid-December. On 2 January 1863, Satellite and three other Union ships steamed to the Piankatank River seeking a schooner which had run through the blockade and entered that stream. However, the Confederates learned of the expedition and scuttled the schooner before the Northern gunboats could reach her. In mid-January, Satellite returned to the Washington Navy Yard for repairs. The following spring, the ship resumed activity on the Rappahannock hoping to support the Union Army's new offensive; but again Lee adroitly bested the Northern commander, now General Joseph Hooker, and won an all-but-decisive victory at Chancellorsville. Nevertheless, Satellite continued to operate on the Rappahannock. From 12 through 14 May, she participated in an expedition with captured schooners, Sarah Lavinia and Ladies Delight, and took a large quantity of goods from warehouses at Urbana. On the 21st, she joined USS Currituck and USS Anacostia in seizing schooner, Emily, at the mouth of the Rappahannock. A week later, she captured schooners, Sarah and Arctic, up the eastern branch of the Great Wicomico River, an estuary between the Rappahannock and the Potomac.

With USS Jacob Bell and USS Yankee, she took a canoe and a flatboat on 13 July near the Rappahannock's Union Wharf. Satellite's last score came on 17 August when she captured schooner, Two Brothers, near the Great Wicomico. On the night of 22 and 23 August 1863, a daring Confederate boat expedition commanded by Lt. John Taylor Wood, CSN—grandson of the former President of the United States, Zachary Taylor, and nephew of Jefferson Davis, the Confederate President—captured Union gunboats, Satellite and Reliance, off Windmill Point on the Rappahannock. Wood took the prizes up river to Urbana. Satellite, now under Lt. Wood, returned to the mouth of the Rappahannock on the 25th and seized schooner, Golden Rod, laden with coal, and schooners, Coquette and Two Brothers, with cargoes of anchors and chain. The Confederates stripped and burned Golden Rod because of her deep draft and took the other prizes up river to Port Royal, Virginia. There, together with Satellite and USS Reliance, they too were stripped of useful parts and destroyed on 28 August to prevent recapture.
