= USS Commodore Read =

Gunboat of the United States Navy

History

United States
- Name: USS Commodore Read
- Ordered: as Atlantic
- Acquired: 19 August 1863
- Commissioned: 8 September 1863
- Decommissioned: 30 May 1865
- Fate: Sold, 20 July 1865

General characteristics
- Type: Gunboat / Transport
- Displacement: 650 long tons (660 t)
- Length: 179 ft (55 m)
- Beam: 33 ft 6 in (10.21 m)
- Draft: 6 ft 3 in (1.91 m)
- Propulsion: Steam engine
- Complement: 84
- Armament: 2 × 100-pounder rifles; 4 × 24-pounder smoothbore guns

USS Commodore Read was a former ferry acquired by the Union Navy for use during the American Civil War. Because of her shallow draft, she was useful for patrols in rivers and streams. And, because of her ferryboat structure, she was useful as a gun platform or for carrying passengers or prisoners.

== Service history ==
Commodore Read – formerly the ferryboat Atlantic – was built in 1857 and purchased by the Navy at New York City on 19 August 1863; fitted out at New York Navy Yard; and commissioned on 8 September 1863, Acting Master E. S. Turner in command. The ship was named in honor of Commodore George C. Read. Assigned to duty with the Potomac Flotilla, she put to sea on 12 September 1863, arriving at Washington Navy Yard three days later. The ship was constantly employed in the rivers and creeks of Virginia, on picket and patrol duty; transporting troops and prisoners of war; towing vessels; capturing and destroying enemy boats and other property; and engaging in frequent action with Confederate cavalry, shore batteries, and ships.

Typical of her service was an expedition to Fredericksburg, Virginia from 6–8 March 1865, when she joined Yankee, Delaware, and Heliotrope to cooperate with the Army in the destruction of Hamilton's Crossing. The expedition, commanded by Colonel Roberts on board Commodore Read, destroyed the railroad depot and bridge, 28 loaded railway cars, an army wagon train, miles of railroad track, and telegraph equipment, as well as capturing 30 prisoners, tobacco, bales of cotton, 28 mules, and mail. Arriving at the Washington Navy Yard on 30 May, Commodore Read was sold there on 20 July.
