= Potomac Flotilla =

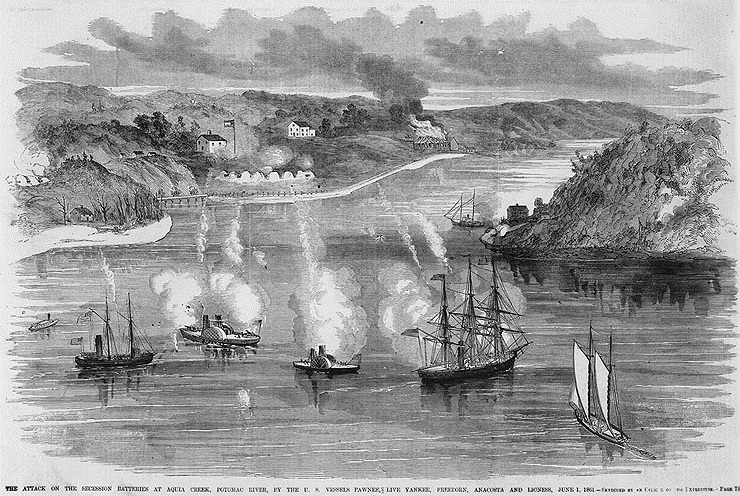
- Attack on the Confederate Batteries at Aquia Creek by the Potomac Flotilla
- Active: 1861–1865
- Country: United States
- Branch: United States Navy
- Type: naval squadron

The Potomac Flotilla, also called the Potomac Squadron, was a unit of the United States Navy created in the early days of the American Civil War to secure Union communications in the Chesapeake Bay, the Potomac River and their tributaries, and to disrupt Confederate communications and shipping there.

== History ==
=== American Civil War ===
On April 22, 1861 Commander James H. Ward, who was the commanding officer of the receiving ship USS North Carolina at the New York Navy Yard in Brooklyn New York, wrote to United States Secretary of the Navy Gideon Wells to put forth a plan for the protection of the Chesapeake Bay area. Ward suggested a "Flying Flotilla" of light-draft vessels to operate in the Chesapeake Bay, the Potomac River, and their tributaries. His commander, Captain Samuel L. Breese, commandant of the New York Navy Yard, endorsed his plan. Wells accepted this proposal and wrote back to Ward and Breese on 27 April 1861 authorizing them to begin carrying out Ward's plan. On 1 May 1861 the first vessels for the new flotilla were acquired. On 16 May 1861 Ward set out from the New York Navy Yard with three vessels, USS Thomas Freeborn, USS Reliance, and USS Resolute. He arrived at the Washington Navy Yard in Washington, D.C., on 20 May 1861 on board his flagship,Thomas Freeborn.

On 27 June 1861 Ward's flotilla engaged the Confederates at Mathias Point, Virginia. While he was sighting the bow gun of Thomas Freeborn, Ward was shot through the abdomen and died within an hour due to internal hemorrhaging. He was the first United States Navy officer to be killed during the American Civil War.

After the death of Ward the flotilla was led by a succession of short-term commanders until the fall of 1862 when Commodore Andrew A. Harwood took command. He was in turn succeeded by Commander Foxhall A. Parker on 31 December 1864.

The Civil War ended in April 1865, and on 18 July 1865 the United States Department of the Navy ordered Parker to disband the flotilla, effective 31 July 1865. Most of the flotilla's remaining vessels were sent to the Washington Navy Yard to be decommissioned.

=== Name of the flotilla ===
It was not until August 1861 that the flotilla became known as the Potomac Flotilla. The designation of "Flying Flotilla" was dropped when Ward's force arrived in the theater of operations. The flotilla was then referred to by a variety of names, including: Flotilla, Potomac River; Potomac Blockade; Flotilla in the Chesapeake; etc. In early August 1861 the flotilla commander and the Department of the Navy began to consistently refer to the command as the Potomac Flotilla.

=== Operations ===
1861
Engagement with the Confederate batteries at Aquia Creek, Virginia, 29 May – 1 June 1861
Affair at Mathias Point, Virginia, 27 June 1861
Engagement with the Confederate batteries at Potomac Creek, Virginia, 23 August 1861
Engagement with the Confederate battery at Freestone Point, Virginia, 25 September 1861

1862
Engagement at Cockpit Point, Virginia, 3 January 1862
Expedition up the Rappahannock River to Tappahannock, Virginia, 13–15 April 1862
Expedition up the Rappahannock River to Fredericksburg, Virginia, 20 April 1862
Expeditions to Gwynn's Island and Nomini Creek, Virginia, 3–4 Nov, 1862
Engagement at Port Royal, Virginia, 4 December 1862
Engagement at Brandywine Hill, Rappahannock River, Virginia, 10–11 December 1862

1863
Destruction of salt works on Dividing Creek, Virginia, 12 January 1863
Destruction of Confederate stores at Tappahannock, Virginia, 30 May 1863
Capture of U. S. steamers USS Satellite and USRC Reliance, 16 August 1863

1864
Expedition to the Northern Neck of Virginia, 12 January 1864
Expedition up the Rappahannock River, Virginia, 18–21 April 1864
Expedition to Carter's Creek, Virginia, 29 April 1864
Expedition to Mill Creek, Virginia, 12–13 May 1864
Expedition up the Rappahannock River, Virginia, 16–19 May 1864
Expedition to the Northern Neck of Virginia, 11–21 June 1864
Expedition to Milford Haven and Stutt's Creek, Virginia, 24 September 1864

1865
Expedition to Fredericksburg, Virginia, 6–8 March 1865
Expedition up the Rappahannock River, 12–14 March 1865
Operations in Mattox Creek, Virginia, 16–18 March 1865

== Ships of the flotilla ==
When Commander James H. Ward departed the New York Navy Yard on 16 May 1861 his flotilla consisted of three vessels. The size of the flotilla steadily increased until it reached a strength that hovered between 15 and 25 vessels.

Ship	Rate	Type	Notes
USS Casco	4th	Ironclad monitor	Casco class
USS Chimo	4th	Ironclad monitor	Casco class
USS Mahopac	4th	Ironclad monitor	Canonicus class
USS Saugus	4th	Ironclad monitor	Canonicus class
USS Pawnee	2nd	Screw sloop	
USS Seminole	3rd	Screw sloop	
USS Wachusett	3rd	Screw sloop	Commander Wilkes' flagship
USS Allegheny	4th	Screw sloop	Receiving ship at Baltimore
USRC Harriet Lane	3rd	Sidewheel gunboat	Revenue cutter from United States Revenue-Marine
USS Mahaska	3rd	Sidewheel gunboat	
USS Port Royal	3rd	Sidewheel gunboat	
USS Anacostia	4th	Screw gunboat	
USS Aroostook	4th	Screw gunboat	
USS Crusader	4th	Screw gunboat	
USS Currituck	4th	Screw gunboat	
USS Dawn	4th	Screw gunboat	
USS Don	4th	Screw gunboat	Blockade runner captured by USS Pequot 4 March 1864 off Beaufort, North Carolina.
USS Dragon	4th	Screw gunboat	
USS E. B. Hale	4th	Screw gunboat	
USS Eureka	4th	Screw gunboat	Steamer captured by USS Anacostia 20 April 1862 on the Rappahannock River, Virginia.
USS Fuchsia	4th	Screw gunboat	
USS Little Ada	4th	Screw gunboat	Blockade runner captured by USS Gettysburg 9 July 1864 in South Santee River, South Carolina.
USS Mystic	4th	Screw gunboat	
USS Penguin	4th	Screw gunboat	
USS Pocahontas	4th	Screw gunboat	
USS Teaser	4th	Screw gunboat	ex-Confederate captured by USS Maratanza 4 July 1862 on the James River, Virginia
USS Tulip	4th	Screw gunboat	Sunk by boiler explosion off Ragged Point, Virginia, 11 November 1864
USS Valley City	4th	Screw gunboat	
USS Western World	4th	Screw gunboat	
USS Wyandotte	4th	Screw gunboat	
USS Adela	4th	Sidewheel gunboat	Blockade runner captured by USS Quaker City 7 July 1862 off New Providence in the Bahamas
USS Banshee	4th	Sidewheel gunboat	Blockade runner captured by USAT Fulton and USS Grand Gulf on 21 November 1863 off Wilmington, North Carolina
USS Ceres	4th	Sidewheel gunboat	
USS Coeur de Lion	4th	Sidewheel gunboat	
USS Commodore Barney	4th	Sidewheel gunboat	ex-ferryboat
USS Commodore Read	4th	Sidewheel gunboat	ex-ferryboat
USS Delaware	4th	Sidewheel gunboat	
USS Jacob Bell	4th	Sidewheel gunboat	
USS Isaac N. Seymour	4th	Sidewheel gunboat	
USS John L. Lockwood	4th	Sidewheel gunboat	
USS Mercury	4th	Sidewheel gunboat	
USS Morse	4th	Sidewheel gunboat	ex-ferryboat
USS Mount Washington	4th	Sidewheel gunboat	Known as USS Mount Vernon until 4 November 1861
USS Nansemond	4th	Sidewheel gunboat	
USS Satellite	4th	Sidewheel gunboat	Captured by Confederate boarding party 23 August 1863 in Rappahannock River, scuttled at Port Royal, Virginia, 28 August 1863
USS Stepping Stones	4th	Sidewheel gunboat	ex-ferryboat
USS Thomas Freeborn	4th	Sidewheel gunboat	Commander Ward's flagship
USS Underwriter	4th	Sidewheel gunboat	
USS Union	4th	Screw auxiliary	
USS Baltimore	4th	Sidewheel auxiliary	Ordnance vessel, Washington Navy Yard
USS Cactus	4th	Sidewheel auxiliary	Supply ship
USS Ella	4th	Sidewheel auxiliary	Picket and dispatch vessel
USS Ice Boat	4th	Sidewheel auxiliary	Icebreaker
USS King Philip	4th	Sidewheel auxiliary	Dispatch vessel, known as USS Powhatan until 4 November 1861
USS Philadelphia	4th	Sidewheel auxiliary	Transport ferry
USS Wyandank	4th	Sidewheel auxiliary	Storeship
USS Juniper	4th	Screw tug	
USS Leslie	4th	Screw tug	
USS Moccasin	4th	Screw tug	
USS Periwinkle	4th	Screw tug	
USS Primrose	4th	Screw tug	
USS Reliance	4th	Screw tug	Captured by Confederate boarding party 23 August 1863 in Rappahannock River, scuttled at Port Royal, Virginia, 28 August 1863
USS Rescue	4th	Screw tug	
USS Resolute	4th	Screw tug	
USS Tigress	4th	Screw tug	Sunk 10 September 1861 in collision with merchant ship State of Maine off Indian Head, Maryland
USS Verbena	4th	Screw tug	
USS Watch	4th	Screw tug	Known as USS A. C. Powell until August 1862, known as USS Alert from August 1862 to 2 February 1865
USS Young America	4th	Screw tug	ex-Confederate, captured 24 April 1861 by USS Cumberland at Hampton Roads, Virginia
USS General Putnam	4th	Sidewheel tug	Also known as USS William G. Putnam
USS Heliotrope	4th	Sidewheel tug	
USS Island Belle	4th	Sidewheel tug	Tug and dispatch boat
USS Yankee	4th	Sidewheel tug	
E. H. Herbert	-	Tug	Chartered vessel
Edwin Forrest	-	Tug	Chartered vessel
James Murray	-	Tug	Chartered vessel
USS Bibb	-	Sidewheel steamer	from United States Coast Survey
USS Corwin	-	Sidewheel Steamer	from United States Coast Survey
USS Adolph Hugel	4th	Sailing schooner	mortar schooner
USS Arletta	4th	Sailing schooner	Mortar schooner
USS Dan Smith	4th	Sailing schooner	Mortar schooner
USS George Mangham	4th	Sailing schooner	Mortar schooner
USS Matthew Vassar	4th	Sailing schooner	Mortar schooner
USS Racer	4th	Sailing schooner	Mortar schooner
USS Sophronia	4th	Sailing schooner	Mortar schooner
USS T. A. Ward	4th	Sailing schooner	Mortar schooner
USS William Bacon	4th	Sailing schooner	Mortar schooner
USS Bailey	-	Sailing schooner	from United States Coast Survey
Chaplin	4th	Sailing schooner	
USS Dana	-	Sailing schooner	from United States Coast Survey
USS Howell Cobb	-	Sailing schooner	from United States Coast Survey
USS Alpha	4th	Screw picket boat	Known as Picket Boat No. 1 until sometime between 1 November and 5 December 1864.
USS Beta	4th	Screw picket boat	Known as both USS Bazely and as Picket Boat No. 2 until sometime between 1 November and 5 December 1864. Hit a torpedo (mine) and was destroyed 25 December 1864 by retreating Union troops to prevent Confederate capture.
USS Gamma	4th	Screw picket boat	Known as Picket Boat No. 3 until sometime between 1 November and 5 December 1864.
USS Delta	4th	Screw picket boat	Known as Picket Boat No. 4 until sometime between 1 November and 5 December 1864.
USS Epsilon	4th	Screw picket boat	Known as Picket Boat No. 5 until sometime between 1 November and 5 December 1864.
USS Zeta	4th	Screw picket boat	Known as Picket Boat No. 6 until sometime between 1 November and 5 December 1864.

== Commanders ==
Flotilla commander	From	To	Notes
Commander James Harmon Ward	late April 1861	27 June 1861	Killed in action 27 June 1861
Commander Stephen Clegg Rowan	27 June 1861	10 July 1861	Commander pro tem
Commander Thomas Tingey Craven	10 July 1861	2 December 1861	
Lieutenant Abram D. Harrell	2 December 1861	6 December 1861	Commander pro tem
Lieutenant Robert Harris Wyman	6 December 1861	early July 1862	
Lieutenant Commander Samuel Magaw	early July 1862	1 September 1862	Commander pro tem
Commodore Charles Wilkes	1 September 1862	10 September 1862	
Commodore Andrew Allen Harwood	10 September 1862	31 December 1863	
Commander Foxhall Alexander Parker, Jr.	31 December 1863	31 July 1865	
