= USS T. A. Ward =

Gunboat of the United States Navy

History

United States
- Acquired: 9 October 1861
- Commissioned: 17 January 1862
- Decommissioned: 22 July 1865
- Fate: Sold on 25 September 1865

General characteristics
- Displacement: 284 tons
- Length: 114 ft 6 in (34.90 m)
- Beam: 28 ft 2 in (8.59 m)
- Draft: 10 ft 6 in (3.20 m)
- Depth of hold: 9 ft 2 in (2.79 m)
- Propulsion: schooner sail
- Armament: 1 × 13 in (330 mm) mortar; 2 × 32-pounder guns

USS T. A. Ward was a 284-ton schooner was purchased by the Union Navy during the Union blockade of the Confederate States of America during the American Civil War.

T. A. Ward was initially assigned by the Union Navy for blockade duty in the ports and waterways of the Confederate States of America; however, because of a change in Union strategy, she was redesignated a mortar gunboat, and outfitted with a powerful 13-inch mortar which could fire up onto high riverbank targets, which regular guns could not reach.

== Service history ==
Schooner T. A. Ward was purchased by the Union Navy at New York City on 9 October 1861. While the vessel was being fitted out for blockade duty, she was selected for service in the mortar flotilla being established by Comdr. David Dixon Porter to support Flag Officer David G. Farragut's impending attack on New Orleans, Louisiana. The schooner was armed with a 13-inch seacoast mortar weighing over eight and one-half tons. Two 32-pounders were also installed to give her a low-trajectory punch. The ship was manned by a crew from the receiving ship USS North Carolina and was commissioned at the New York Navy Yard on 17 January 1862, Lt. Walter W. Queen in command. Late in January, the schooner sailed for Hampton Roads, Virginia, carrying supplies for schooners USS George Mangham and USS Adolph Hugel. From that port, she proceeded to Key West, Florida, where Porter's flotilla was assembling. Early in March, she proceeded thence to Ship Island, Mississippi, the staging point for Farragut's invasion of the South.

=== Gulf coast operations ===
In mid-March, the schooners sailed to Pass a l'Outre where they were towed across the bar into the Mississippi River on the 18th. Once inside, they waited almost a month while Farragut's steamers labored to get the West Gulf Blockading Squadron's deep-draft ships over the bar and into the river and while other preparations were made for Farragut's attack on the South's greatest city. On 15 April, revenue cutter USS Harriet Lane towed T. A. Ward up the Mississippi River to a position just out of range of the Southern guns in Fort St. Phillip and Fort Jackson. There, the crews camouflaged their ships with bushes and tree branches. On the morning of the 18th, Lt. Queen, who also commanded the flotilla's second division, had the schooner towed upstream to a predesignated position on the northeast shore of the river less than 4,000 yards from Fort Jackson. Almost immediately, the guns of the fort opened fire on the schooners which, in turn, began lobbing shells into the Confederate stronghold.

Early in the action, a near miss upset several barrels of gunpowder in T. A. Ward's magazine but fortunately did not detonate the explosives. One-half hour later, a shot struck the schooner, damaging her rigging as it smashed through several bulkheads before leaving the vessel through a hole in T. A. Ward's side a few inches above her waterline. Queen then ordered his division to drop downstream a few hundred yards where the schooner's gunners resumed the bombardment as her crew began to repair the damage. The shelling continued for six days and nights. It reached a crescendo in the wee hours of 25 April to distract the gunners in the Southern forts as Farragut's fleet raced upstream past the Confederate strongholds to take New Orleans. The following day, New Orleans fell; but Fort St. Philip and Fort Jackson held out until the 28th when they finally surrendered to Porter. On 6 May, T. A. Ward retired to Ship Island which the mortar flotilla used as a base for blockade operations to cut off Confederate commerce in the Gulf of Mexico while awaiting Farragut's return from the Mississippi to join in an attack on Mobile, Alabama.

Early in June, their blockade duty was interrupted by orders which sent the flotilla back up the Mississippi River to support Farragut in an attack on Vicksburg, Mississippi, which he had been directed to undertake by President Abraham Lincoln. A shortage of steamers in the lower river delayed the flotilla's ascent of the river, but the mortar schooners were on station below Vicksburg on 28 June, in time to bombard the Confederate batteries which guarded the river at that point while Farragut's deep-draft warships dashed past the Southern guns to join Flag Officer Charles H. Davis' Western Flotilla in the upper river. While Farragut's daring foray past Vicksburg was tactically successful, it was brought to naught strategically by the Union Army's want of sufficient troops to take and hold the river fortress. Thus, after a fortnight's inconclusive operations with Davis, Farragut—supported again by the mortar boats—dashed once more under the Confederate guns and retired downstream to New Orleans.

=== East coast operations ===
Meanwhile, events had occurred near Richmond, Virginia, which beckoned T. A. Ward back to the U.S. East Coast. General George B. McClellan's drive up the Peninsula toward the Confederate capital had been halted by General Robert E. Lee's Army of Northern Virginia in the Seven Days campaign, and the Union's Army of the Potomac was beleaguered in a bridgehead at Harrison's Landing on the northern bank of the James River. As a result, in an effort to save the imperiled Northern troops, Federal Army leaders in Washington asked U.S. Secretary of the Navy Gideon Welles for all possible naval support in the James. In compliance, the Union Secretary of the Navy ordered most of Porter's mortar boats back to Hampton Roads, where T. A. Ward and her sisters arrived on the last day of July.

By this time, however, the greatest danger to the Union Army had passed; and the mortar vessels were repaired before resuming active operations. When back in top fighting trim, T. A. Ward was assigned to the Potomac Flotilla which was then protecting Union communications with Washington, D.C. by water and attempting to stop Confederate traffic across the Potomac River between Maryland and Virginia. Her first contact with the enemy came on the night of 3 and 4 October near Blakistone Island, Maryland, when she captured a large man-of-war boat which was attempting to slip back to Virginia under cover of darkness. The next night, she took two more boats attempting to run the blockade from Breton and St. Clement's Bays. Later in the month, the ship sailed to the Rappahannock River for blockade duty. On 29 October, a party from T. A. Ward helped to put out a fire in the American merchant ship Alleghanian, which had been set ablaze by a group of Virginians.

By mid-November, the schooner was back on station in the Potomac and captured the sloop G. W. Green; a seine boat; and six prisoners near St. Jerome's Creek, Maryland. She continued to serve in the Potomac Flotilla until transferred to the North Atlantic Blockading Squadron early in the summer of 1863. T. A. Ward arrived at Hampton Roads on 5 July and soon was stationed off Wilmington, North Carolina, where she served on blockade duty into the autumn. On 26 September, orders from Washington directed her to proceed to waters off Charleston, South Carolina, for duty with the South Atlantic Blockading Squadron. On 17 October 1863 at Murrell's Inlet, South Carolina, boat crews from the schooner destroyed Southern merchant schooner Rover, before that blockade runner could slip to sea laden with cotton. Three days later, a party from T. A. Ward went ashore to reconnoiter and obtain fresh water; but it was surprised by Confederate cavalry. Ten of the Union seamen were captured.

On 12 April 1864, boats from T. A. Ward and USS South Carolina seized the blockade-running steamer Alliance, which the night before had run aground on Daufuskie Island, South Carolina, laden with glass, liquor, and soap. On 16 August 1864, a boat expedition from USS Saratoga and T. A. Ward captured some 100 prisoners and a large quantity of arms during a daring raid into McIntosh County, Georgia. The Union landing party also destroyed a salt works and a bridge across the South Newport River on the main road to Savannah, Georgia. Between the 23d and the 25th of the same month, men from these two ships engaged Confederate pickets along Georgia's Turtle River. T. A. Ward spent the autumn and early winter undergoing repairs at Port Royal, South Carolina; but, by New Year's Day 1865, she was on blockade duty off Charleston, and she served in nearby waters through the end of the Civil War. In June 1865, she was detached and sailed north. The schooner arrived at Portsmouth, New Hampshire, on 15 July 1865, was decommissioned there on 22 July 1865, and was sold on 25 September 1865.
