= John McGowan (naval officer) =

Union and US Navy Officer (1843–1915)

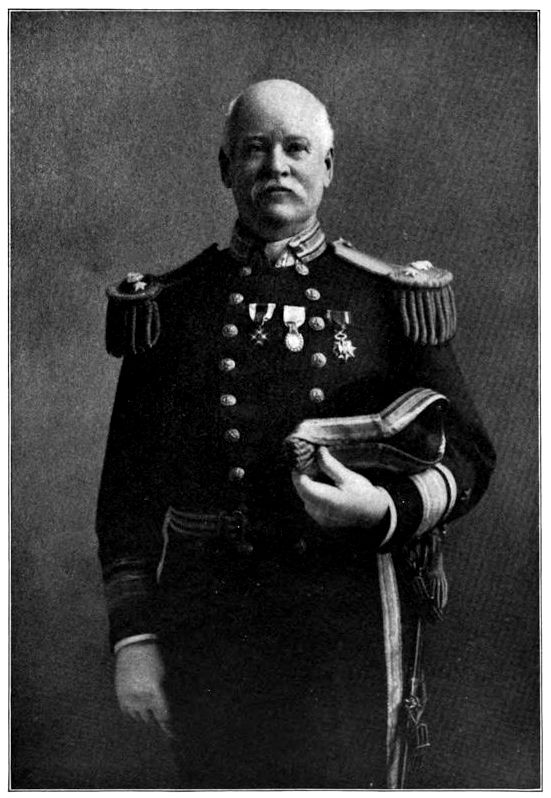
- Portrait photograph in dress uniform (c. 1907)
- Born: August 4, 1843; Port Penn, Delaware
- Died: August 14, 1915 (aged 72); Haines Falls, New York
- Military career
- Allegiance: Union, United States
- Branch: Union Navy, US Navy
- Service years: 1861–1901
- Rank: Rear admiral
- Commands: Monterey; Monadnock
- Conflicts: American Civil War; Philippine–American War

John McGowan (1843–1915) was an officer in the Union Navy during the Civil War and afterwards in the United States Navy.

== Early life ==
John McGowan was born in Port Penn, Delaware, on August 4, 1843. He was the son of John and Catherine (Caldwell) McGowan. He was educated in the public schools of Philadelphia, Pennsylvania, 1848–1853, and in private schools in Elizabeth, New Jersey, 1854–1859.

== Volunteer navy ==
Entering the volunteer navy, he was appointed acting master's mate on March 8, 1862, serving on the Reliance and the Yankee. He was promoted to acting master on May 8, 1862, and ordered to command the USS Wyandank in the Potomac Flotilla. He served on the Potomac and Rappahannock Rivers until February 1863, when he was detached from the Wyandank and ordered to the Florida as navigator. He served on the Florida in the blockade off Wilmington, North Carolina until October 1864, when the ship went to New York for repairs. In November of the same year he was detached from the Florida and ordered to the USS State of Georgia as navigator; arrived off Wilmington, North Carolina the day after the capture of Fort Fisher, his ship being then ordered to reinforce the fleet off Charleston, South Carolina. While there he took part in the Bulls Bay Expedition, which was one of the causes of the evacuation of Charleston by the Confederates.

Soon after the evacuation, the State of Georgia was ordered to Aspinwall (Colon) to protect American interests on the Isthmus of Panama. Before sailing for Aspinwall, McGowan succeeded Lieutenant Manly as executive officer of the ship. In November 1865 he was ordered to the USS Monongahela as watch and division officer; served on the Monongahela in the West Indies until January 1867, when he was detached and, a few days later, joined the USS Tacony, Commander Roe, fitting out for duty in the Gulf Squadron. He was at Vera Cruz nearly all the summer of 1867, which witnessed the fall of Maximilian's empire.

After the death of Maximilian and the surrender of Vera Cruz to the Liberals, the Tacony returned to Pensacola, Florida, but yellow fever breaking out aboard, the ship went to Portsmouth, New Hampshire, where, after undergoing quarantine, the officers were detached and ordered to their homes the latter part of September 1867. In October of the same year, McGowan was ordered to duty on board the receiving ship at the Philadelphia navy yard. He commanded the USS Constellation there and was afterward executive officer of the frigate Potomac, also a receiving ship at Philadelphia.

== Regular navy ==
In March 1868 while on the Potomac, he received a commission as master in the regular navy and in October 1868 was ordered to duty with the Asiatic Fleet. On reporting to the admiral, he was ordered to duty as executive officer of the USS Unadilla; succeeded to the command of the Unadilla in June 1869 and in November of that year was detached from the Unadilla and ordered to the USS Iroquois; returned in her to the United States, the ship going out of commission in April 1870. In April 1870 he was promoted to be lieutenant commander and while in that grade served on the double-turreted monitor Terror, the Wachusetts, Juniata and Marion as executive officer and at the League Island, Philadelphia and Brooklyn navy yards.

In January 1887 he was promoted to commander; commanded the Swatara, St. Mary's, Portsmouth and Alliance and was also commandant of the naval training station at Newport, Rhode Island from December 1896 to July 1899. He was promoted captain in February 1899 and in August took command of the USS Monadnock at Manila. In November 1900 he was ordered to duty as commandant of the naval station at Key West, Florida. In April 1901 he was detached and ordered before the retiring board. He was retired with the rank of rear admiral in April 1901.

== Personal life ==
In October 1871, John McGowan wedded Evelyn Manderson of Philadelphia. He died on August 14, 1915, at Twilight Park in Haines Falls, New York, where he was spending the summer. He was seventy-two years old. Funeral services with full military honors were held at Arlington National Cemetery on August 16.

== Honors ==
Admiral McGowan was a member of the Military Order of the Loyal Legion, of the Order of Foreign Wars, the Sons of the Revolution and of the Society of Marine Engineers and Naval Architects. He was also a member of the following clubs: the Metropolitan and Chevy Chase of Washington, D.C.; the Rittenhouse of Philadelphia, the Union of New York, and the New York Yacht Club. He was a life member of the American Irish Historical Society, and its President-General from 1906 to 1907.
