= Admiral McGowan =

Admiral McGowan may refer to:

- John McGowan (naval officer) (1843–1915), admiral of the Union Navy and the U.S. Navy
- Samuel McGowan (admiral) (1870–1934), admiral of the U.S. Navy
