= USS Racer (1861) =

Gunboat of the United States Navy

History

United States
- Laid down: date unknown
- Launched: date unknown
- Acquired: 29 August 1861
- Commissioned: 21 January 1862
- Decommissioned: 2 September 1865
- Stricken: date unknown
- Fate: Sold, 27 September 1865

General characteristics
- Displacement: 252 tons
- Length: 105 ft 0 in (32.00 m)
- Beam: 28 ft 10 in (8.79 m)
- Draft: 9 ft 10 in (3.00 m)
- Depth of hold: 9 ft 6 in (2.90 m)
- Propulsion: sail
- Speed: varied
- Complement: 36
- Armament: two 32-pounder guns; one 13" mortar; two 12-pounder rifled guns

USS Racer was a schooner acquired by the Union Navy during the American Civil War. She was used for various purposes, but, especially for bombardment because of her large 13-inch mortar that could fire up and over tall riverbanks.

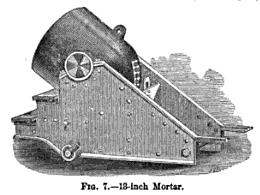
13 Inch Mortar

Racer was purchased for $7500 by the Navy at New York City 29 August 1861; and commissioned at the New York Navy Yard 21 January, Acting Master Alvin Phinney in command.

Originally fitted out for blockade duty, the schooner first carried four 32-pounders, but, before she commissioned, she was selected for service in Comdr. David D. Porter's mortar flotilla, and two of her cannon were removed to make room for a 13-inch mortar and two 12-pounder rifles.

== Sent south to the Mississippi delta ==
Towed by tugs Burlech and T. Carey, schooners Racer, USS C. P. Williams, and USS John Griffith departed New York Harbor 23 January 1862 and proceeded via Key West, Florida, to the Gulf of Mexico. They reached Ship Island, Mississippi, on 13 March and 5 days later entered the Mississippi River over the bar at Pass a l'Outre.

Flag Officer David G. Farragut, the commander of the Union expedition against New Orleans, Louisiana, kept his smaller ships busy during the following weeks with training and preparations for the coming attack, while he labored to get his deep draft steamers over the bar and into the river.

== The attack on Fort Jackson ==
With the 3d Division of the Flotilla, Racer was towed upstream on the afternoon of 17 April by USS Clifton and anchored near the left bank of the river under shelter of dense foliage. The crew then trimmed her masts and rigging with branches to camouflage the ship. Meanwhile, the Confederates set blazing fire rafts adrift to float downstream among the Union warships.

About midmorning the next day, Racer and her sister schooner opened fire on Fort Jackson which, with Fort St. Philip, protected New Orleans from attack from the sea. The schooner kept up the bombardment intermittently for 6 days. Soon after midnight on the 24th, they increased their fire on the forts while Farragut made final preparations to race past the southern guns. They maintained their rapid fire cannonade until the Union steam warships were safely past the southern forts and moving on New Orleans to begin the Union conquest of the lower Mississippi valley, which ultimately bisected the Confederacy and foredoomed its collapse.

== The fall of Forts Jackson and St. Philip ==
After New Orleans and the southern forts fell, Porter and his flotilla retired down the Mississippi and proceeded via Ship Island to Pensacola, Florida. However, they soon returned to the Mississippi to support Farragut's expedition up the river and reached sight of Vicksburg, Mississippi, 20 June. The schooners shelled Confederate batteries as Farragut raced past the fortress to meet Flag Officer Davis' Western Flotilla and again, a fortnight later, when he dashed back down.

== East Coast operations ==
On 9 July orders arrived for Porter to return to the U.S. East Coast with a dozen schooners. Racer reached Norfolk, Virginia, late in the month and following repairs at Philadelphia, Pennsylvania, joined the Potomac Flotilla in September.

For the next year, she operated on the Potomac River and the Rappahannock River. On 18 July 1863, she joined USS Jacob Bell and USS Resolute in driving off Confederate troops attacking ship George Peabody, aground at Mathias Point, Virginia.

Shortly thereafter, Racer was transferred to the South Atlantic Blockading Squadron and participated in operations against Charleston, South Carolina.

== Post-war decommissioning and sale ==
After the war ended, Racer was decommissioned at New York 2 September and was sold at auction there 27 September 1865 to a Mr. White for $9500.
