= USS Arletta =

Gunboat of the United States Navy

History

United States
- Laid down: date unknown
- Launched: 1860
- Acquired: 7 September 1861
- Commissioned: 30 January 1862
- Decommissioned: 28 September 1865
- Stricken: 1865 (est.)
- Fate: Sold on 30 November 1865

General characteristics
- Displacement: 200 tons
- Length: 103 ft (31.4 m)
- Beam: 27 ft (8.2 m)
- Draft: depth of hold: 8 ft 6 in (2.6 m); draft: 10 ft 6 in (3.2 m)
- Propulsion: schooner sail
- Speed: varied
- Complement: 39
- Armament: one 13 in (330 mm) mortar; two 32-pounder smoothbores; two 12-pounder smootbores

USS Arletta was a schooner acquired by the Union Navy during the American Civil War. She was used by the Union Navy as a gunboat and, at times, an ammunition ship, in support of the Union Navy blockade of Confederate waterways.

== Commissioned at the New York Navy Yard in 1862 ==
Arletta—a schooner built in 1860 at Mystic, Connecticut—was purchased at New York City by the Union Navy on 7 September 1861 and commissioned in the New York Navy Yard on 30 January 1862.

== Assigned to the Mortar Flotilla ==
The schooner departed New York Harbor on 4 February 1861 as a part of the Mortar Flotilla assembled to become a part of Flag Officer David Glasgow Farragut's newly established West Gulf Blockading Squadron. Besides sealing off the Confederate coast between Pensacola, Florida, and the mouth of the Rio Grande, Farragut was charged with leading a Union task force from the Gulf of Mexico up the Mississippi River to capture New Orleans, Louisiana. Once he had taken the "Crescent City", the flag officer was to continue on upstream until he met the warships of the Western Flotilla which were fighting their way down from the Ohio River and upper Mississippi River. The Lincoln Administration hoped that, if all went well, this strategy would cut the Confederacy in two and thus hasten the end of the rebellion.

However, two formidable defensive works, Forts Jackson and St. Philip, were located on opposite sides of the Mississippi below New Orleans, protecting the Southern metropolis from seaborne enemies. The Mortar Flotilla—commanded by Comdr. David Dixon Porter—had been set up to neutralize the batteries within these Confederate fortresses while Farragut's deep-draft, salt-water warships dashed past them to take New Orleans.

=== Blockade duty off Mobile Bay, Alabama ===
Following a stop at Key West, Florida, from 18 February to 6 March, Arletta performed blockade duty off Mobile Bay, Alabama, from 11 to 15 March, and then proceeded to Ship Island, Mississippi, whence she was towed by revenue cutter USS Harriet Lane (1857) to the Mississippi River Delta. She crossed over the bar at Pass á Loutre on the 18th and entered the river.

=== Preparations for the attack on Mississippi River forts ===
Much was yet to be done before Farragut could launch his attack. His deep-draft steamers had to be laboriously worked over a bar that was far too shallow for them to cross under normal circumstances; surveying parties had to work almost within the shadows of the forts to locate and mark the positions of each schooner during the impending action; and the mortar boats had to be stripped for action and camouflaged with local underbrush and foliage to reduce their vulnerability to Southern artillery.

=== Arletta's guns strike Fort Jackson ===
Everything was finally ready by mid-afternoon of 16 April when Porter embarked in Arletta and took her—accompanied by two of her sister schooners—upriver to anchor at predetermined sites to test the mortars and their mounts and to determine the ranges of their targets. Confederate cannon fired intermittently upon the small Northern sailing ships, but the Southern rounds all fell short. Meanwhile, Arletta's mortar answered with five shells, three of which exploded inside Fort Jackson. After an hour's action, Porter—highly satisfied with the performance of his mortars, gunners, and ships—ordered his captains to retire downstream.

=== Confederates send out a fireship ===
The next day, hoping that it would collide with and set fire to one or more of the Union warships, Southerners put the torch to an incendiary-laden fire raft and cast it adrift as a fireship. When Union lookouts spotted the blazing barge, Arletta launched boats which took the menacing raft in tow, pulled it ashore, and put out the fire.

=== Union ships increase fire to allow Farragut to pass the fort ===
On the morning of the 18th, the steamers of the flotilla towed the schooners into position to begin a steady and prolonged bombardment of the forts. Arletta—assigned to the first division of schooners, commanded by Lt. Watson Smith—got off 96 shells during the first day, but lost one man who was killed by an 8-inch solid shot from Fort Jackson which also briefly put her mortar out of action. For the next few days, the schooners kept up the shelling. Then, during the wee hours of the 24th; they greatly increased the tempo of their cannonade to give Farragut's steam warships the maximum possible support during their run by the forts.

=== Return to the Gulf to prevent blockade running ===
That evening, after the flag officer's force had reached safety beyond range of Southern shot and shell, Arletta and her division mates dropped downriver to Southwest Pass where they anchored to prepare for a return to sea. During ensuing weeks, they operated in the Gulf of Mexico, helping to enforce the blockade while awaiting the return of Farragut and his deep-draft warships to join them in operations against Mobile, Alabama.

The most notable event in Arletta's service during this period was her chase on 21 May of a cotton-laden steamer which apparently had slipped out of Mobile Bay. The schooner "... put a shot into ..." the blockade runner and forced her to jettison cargo in order to escape to windward.

=== Farragut criticized by his superiors at Washington, D.C. ===
Meanwhile, Farragut—perplexed by ambiguous, conflicting, and unrealistic orders—had postponed his attack on Mobile and, instead, had ascended the Mississippi River to Vicksburg, Mississippi. There, he found Confederate cliffside fortifications far too strong to be captured without the help of a cooperating ground force many times larger than that which accompanied him.

As a result, Farragut dropped downstream with the intention of next striking Mobile, Alabama. However, upon reaching New Orleans, he found messages from Washington rebuking him for not remaining near Vicksburg and stating that Northern strategy demanded that he immediately return upstream, clearing the Mississippi River as he went, until meeting the Union's Western Flotilla.

=== Union flotilla ascends the Mississippi River to Vicksburg ===
At the suggestion of the Army commander in the area, Maj. Gen. Benjamin F. Butler, Farragut called 10 of his schooners back to the Mississippi River to support an attack on Vicksburg. Porter complied by bringing, not just 10, but the whole flotilla.

The schooners departed Pensacola, Florida, on 3 June and crossed the bar at Pass a Loutre three days later. However, once they were in the river, their ascent was delayed until steamers could be obtained from the Army to tow them upstream against the current. When this indispensable support finally became available about a fortnight later, Arletta departed New Orleans and headed up the Mississippi River under tow. Southern shore batteries fired upon her as she was passing Grand Gulf, Mississippi; but her return fire and that of sister ships silenced the Confederate cannon before they did any damage.

=== Flotilla bombards Vicksburg while Farragut makes his run upriver ===
She arrived on station just below Vicksburg late in the month and first opened fire on the 27th. Before dawn the following morning, the entire flotilla began shelling the Southern batteries; and the schooners kept up their fire until most of Farragut's ships had reached safety well out of range of the Vicksburg's guns.

Over the ensuing days, while they awaited news of events above Vicksburg and further orders from Farragut, Arletta and her sister schooners from time to time bombarded the cliffside forts. In the meantime, events had recently occurred in Virginia which would soon deprive the flag officer of most of these mortar boats.

== Union problems on the James River in Virginia ==
Robert E. Lee's Seven Days campaign in late June and early July had turned back a Union drive toward Richmond, Virginia, and had penned up the Federal army in a small area at Harrison's Landing on the northern bank of the James River. Support fire from Federal gunboats already operating on the river had helped to save the Union force from destruction; and, on 8 July, Washington—recognizing the value of naval firepower—wired Farragut to send 12 of these schooners to Hampton Roads, Virginia, to reinforce the James River Flotilla.

=== Arletta sails for the James River ===
Arletta headed downstream with the largest division of the flotilla on the 11th, stood out to sea on the 17th, and entered Hampton Roads, Virginia, on the 30th. Following repairs at the Norfolk Navy Yard, she was towed up the James River by the side-wheeler USS Satellite (1854) on 9 August and, the next day, took station off Claremont Plantation. For most of the rest of the month, she operated in the James to protect General George B. McClellan's troops as they withdrew from the peninsula to return to Northern Virginia to strengthen the defenses of Washington.

=== Reassigned to the Potomac Flotilla in defense of Washington ===
On 29 August, while the Second Battle of Bull Run was beginning, she headed down the James under tow in preparation for transfer to the Potomac River to bolster Union naval power there against possible attacks on the national capital. She left Hampton Roads on the last day of the month and arrived at Washington, D.C., on 5 September.

The schooner remained in that vicinity, ready to help to defend the seat of the Federal Government in the event that Robert E. Lee's army—which had crossed the Potomac River into Maryland—attack. After the Union stand at Antietam had repelled this invasion of the North, Arletta left Washington on 18 September to begin operations downstream with the Potomac Flotilla. She continued this duty until returning to the Washington Navy Yard at the end of October to have her mortar removed and to be fitted out as an ordnance vessel.

== Reassigned to the North Atlantic Blockade as an ammunition ship ==
Reassigned to the North Atlantic Blockading Squadron, the schooner departed Washington on 28 November and arrived at Fort Monroe, Virginia, on 2 December. There she took on a cargo of ammunition and stores and stood to sea on 23 December 1862. She reached the vicinity of Wilmington, North Carolina, on 4 January and began delivering ammunition to Union warships on blockade duty, a task she continued into the spring.

On 19 April 1863, she headed for Beaufort, North Carolina, her station for the last two years of the Civil War.

== Post-war decommissioning and sale ==
On 17 September 1865, Arletta departed the North Carolina Sounds and headed north. She reached the Philadelphia Navy Yard on the 25th and was decommissioned there on 28 September 1865. The schooner was sold on 30 November 1865.
