= USS Yankee (1861) =

Tugboat of the United States Navy

History

United States
- Launched: 1860
- Acquired: 1861
- Commissioned: 1861
- Decommissioned: 16 May 1865
- Fate: Sold at public auction on 15 September 1865

General characteristics
- Displacement: 328 tons
- Length: 146 ft (45 m)
- Beam: 25 ft 7 in (7.80 m)
- Propulsion: steam engine; side-wheel propelled
- Armament: two 32-pounder guns

USS Yankee was a steam-powered side-wheel tugboat acquired by the Union Navy just prior to the outbreak of the American Civil War.

== Service history ==
The Yankee—a side-wheel steamer built in 1860 at New York City—was one of three steam tugs chartered early in April 1861 at New York City for use on the expedition to provision Fort Sumter, South Carolina, the first U.S. state to declare its secession from the Union, which it had done on 20 December 1860. She departed New York on 8 April 1861 and arrived off Charleston Bar on the 15th, a few hours after Major Robert Anderson's command had evacuated the fort and embarked in Federal transport Baltic. On the 20th, Yankee assisted in the evacuation of the Norfolk Navy Yard, Norfolk, Virginia, towing USS Cumberland to safety. She then returned to the New York Navy Yard.

Yankee left the navy yard on 26 April 1861 for duty as a dispatch and escort vessel between Annapolis, Maryland, and Havre de Grace, Maryland. On 30 April 1861, she received orders to Hampton Roads for reconnaissance duty between the Rip Raps and Cape Henry, Virginia. Batteries manned by Virginia forces that had not yet been formally incorporated into the Confederate States Army at Gloucester Point, Virginia, fired upon Yankee on 7 May 1861, doing little damage but reportedly wounding two Union sailors. Yankee returned fire with four shots and two shells but the crew could not elevate its guns high enough to reach the shore batteries and Yankee broke off the action and returned to Hampton Roads. After further reconnaissance duty along the eastern shore of Virginia and the James River, Yankee proceeded to the Washington Navy Yard on 25 May 1861 to deliver prize schooners General Knox and Georgeanna. She sailed for Hampton Roads on the last day of May 1861 and arrived on 2 June 1861 but was sent north a week later for major repairs at the Philadelphia Navy Yard. On 2 July 1861, Yankee departed Philadelphia, Pennsylvania, bound via the Washington Navy Yard for Hampton Roads. However, Confederate activity along the Potomac River necessitated that the vessel remain at Washington; and she was formally attached to the Potomac Flotilla on 9 July 1861.

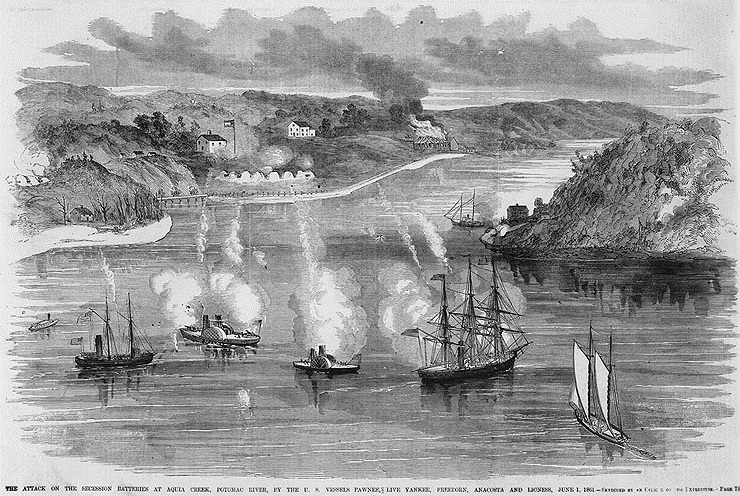
Yankee at the attack on the Confederate Batteries at Aquia Creek, 1 June 1861

In ensuing months, Yankee was busy operating against Confederate vessels in the Potomac and Southern forces along its banks. On 18 July 1861, she captured the Confederate schooner Favorite in the Yeocomico River, Virginia. On 29 July, she and USS Reliance (1860) engaged a Confederate battery at Marlborough Point, Virginia. Yankee destroyed the sloops T. W. Riley and Jane Wright near Smith's Island, Virginia, on 16 August 1861 and captured the schooner Remittance near Piney Point, Maryland, on 28 August 1861. A landing party from USS Anacostia and Yankee destroyed abandoned Confederate entrenchments and batteries at Cockpit Point and Evansport, Virginia, on 9 March 1862, the day of the engagement between the Union ironclad USS Monitor and the Confederate armored ram CSS Virginia.

During brief service with the James River Flotilla supporting General George B. McClellan's beleaguered army at Harrison's Landing in July and August 1862, Yankee assisted in the capture on 27 July 1862 of J. W. Sturges in Chippoak Creek, Virginia. She returned to the Potomac Flotilla on 30 August 1862 and guarded the water approaches to the Federal capital until the following spring. USS Coeur de Lion, USS Primrose, USS Teaser, and Yankee left the Potomac Flotilla for Hampton Roads and duty with the North Atlantic Blockading Squadron in April 1863. Yankee participated in the capture of the strong Confederate position at Hill's Point, Virginia, on the Nansemond River on 20 April 1863, even though the armed tug's length and draft impaired her maneuverability. She returned to the Rappahannock River on 1 May 1863.

During duty on the Rappahannock, Yankee captured the schooner Cassandra and her cargo of whiskey and soda on 11 July 1863. She took the schooner Nanjemoy in the Coan River, Virginia, on 15 July 1863; and captured the sloop Clara Ann on 1 August 1863. Yankee assisted in landing Union cavalry and infantry under General Gilman Marston on the Potomac-Rappahannock peninsula on 12 January 1864 and helped destroy a Confederate encampment under construction at Carter's Creek, Virginia, on 29 April 1864. Yankee's last major operation of the war occurred on 7 March 1865, when the tug joined USS Commodore Read, USS Delaware, USS Heliotrope and Army troops in a raid upon Hamilton's Crossing near Fredericksburg, Virginia. The force destroyed a train depot, a railroad bridge, 28 loaded freight cars, and a Confederate army wagon train. Moreover, she made prisoners of 30 Confederates as well. On 5 May 1865, Yankee sailed to the Washington Navy Yard. Yankee was decommissioned there on 16 May 1865 and was sold at public auction on 15 September 1865 to George B. Collier.
