= USS Juniper =

Tugboat of the United States Navy

History

United States
- Acquired: 7 June 1864
- Commissioned: 11 July 1864
- Decommissioned: 26 May 1865
- Fate: Sold, 29 June 1865

General characteristics
- Displacement: 116 tons
- Length: 79 ft 6 in (24.23 m)
- Beam: 18 ft 4 in (5.59 m)
- Draft: 9 ft (2.7 m)
- Propulsion: steam engine, 24" diameter x 20" stroke; single screw
- Speed: 10 knots (19 km/h; 12 mph)
- Complement: 20
- Armament: 1 × 20-pounder Parrott rifle; 1 × 12-pounder heavy rifle

USS Juniper was a steamer acquired by the Union Navy during the American Civil War. She was used by the Union Navy as a tugboat in support of the Union Navy blockade of Confederate waterways.

== U.S. Navy history ==
Juniper was purchased at New York City from Solomon Thomas 7 June 1864; and commissioned at New York Navy Yard 11 July 1864. Juniper sailed for Washington, D.C. via Hampton Roads, Virginia, arriving at the Washington Navy Yard 17 July 1864. Two days later she was attached to the Potomac River Flotilla where she served during the remainder of the war performing varied duties as a tug, dispatch vessel, and patrol ship. She sailed from the lower Potomac River 5 May 1865 for the Washington Navy Yard, where she decommissioned 26 May. Juniper was sold for US$7,000 to the U.S. Treasury Department for service under the United States Revenue Cutter Service on 23 June 1865.

== U.S. Revenue Cutter Service history ==
The ship's name was changed to USRC Uno on 27 July 1865 and she was transferred to New York City for harbor patrol duty. On 22 November 1870 Uno was taken out of service temporarily for repairs which cost US$3,715. She was again extensively repaired during July 1873. On 25 November 1873 the name of the cutter was changed to USRC Peter G. Washington On 15 July she was temporarily assigned duties at Washington, DC and she returned to New York patrol duties on 3 September. Peter G. Washington was permanently transferred to Philadelphia on 22 August 1893 to take the place of USRC Tench Coxe. On 23 November 1904, the commanding officer of Washington was ordered to proceed to Baltimore at the USRCS Depot to transfer officers, crew and ship's outfits to USRC Wissahickon in preparation for decommissioning. She was decommissioned 3 December 1904 and put up for auction. On 2 March 1906 Peter G. Washington was sold to John H. Gregory of Perth Amboy, New Jersey for US$405.
