= USS Ella (1859) =

Gunboat of the United States Navy

History

United States
- Name: USS Ella
- Namesake: Miss Ella Knapp
- Builder: Thomas Collyer (New York)
- Completed: 1859
- Acquired: (by USN): 30 July 1862
- Commissioned: 10 August 1862
- Decommissioned: 4 August 1865
- Stricken: 1865 (est.)
- Fate: Sold, 15 September 1865

General characteristics
- Tons burthen: 230
- Length: 150 ft (46 m)
- Beam: 23 ft (7.0 m)
- Depth of hold: 8 ft 6 in (2.59 m)
- Installed power: Steam engine; 36-in bore × 8-ft stroke
- Propulsion: Sidewheels
- Speed: 8 knots
- Complement: 39
- Armament: two 24-pounder howitzers

The first USS Ella was a steamer acquired by the Union Navy during the American Civil War. She was used by the Union Navy as a picket and patrol vessel, as well as a dispatch boat, on Confederate waterways.

== Construction and design ==
Ella, a wooden-hulled sidewheel steamboat, was built in New York in 1859 by Thomas Collyer for the Stamford Line of Stamford, Connecticut. She was 150 feet (46 m) in length, with a beam of 23 feet (7.0 m) and hold depth of 8 feet 6 inches (2.59 m). Ella was powered by a single-cylinder steam engine of unknown type, with a bore of 36 inches (91 cm) and stroke of 8 feet (2.4 m), built by Henry Esler & Co. of New York.

== Service history ==
=== Merchant service ===
Ella made her maiden voyage on 5 July 1859. She thereafter operated in daily service between New York City and Stamford, departing the latter at 7 am and clearing New York at 3 pm the same day.

=== Naval service ===
Ella was purchased at New York City 30 July 1862; outfitted at New York Navy Yard; and commissioned 10 August 1862, Acting Master S. C. Gray in command.

Ella sailed 12 August 1862 for duty with the Potomac Flotilla, and arrived at Fortress Monroe 2 days later. She performed her entire service in Virginia waters as a picket, patrol and dispatch boat, based on the navy yard at Washington, D.C.

After a useful career, she returned to her base for the last time 30 July 1865. She was decommissioned there 4 August and sold 15 September 1865.

=== Later history ===
Redocumented as a merchant steamer on October 19, 1865, Ella's later history is unknown. She was last documented about 1875.
