= USS Tigress (1861) =

Gunboat of the United States Navy

History

United States
- Acquired: Summer 1861
- In service: circa 20 August 1861
- Fate: Sunk in collision 10 September 1862

General characteristics
- Type: Armed tug
- Propulsion: Steam engine, one screw
- Armament: one howitzer

The second USS Tigress was a steamer chartered by the United States Navy at the beginning of the American Civil War. She was commissioned in 1861 and served in the Union Navy until lost in 1862.

== Acquisition and commissioning ==
Tigress – a screw tugboat – was chartered by the U.S. Navy at Baltimore, Maryland, from A. C. Hall sometime in the summer of 1861. At some now unknown date, she was purchased by the Navy. She departed Baltimore on 20 August, bound for the Washington Navy Yard in Washington, D.C., where she was outfitted with a howitzer.

== Service history ==
After her conversion for Navy service was completed, Tigress received orders to patrol the Potomac River. She joined Captain Thomas T. Craven's Potomac River Flotilla on 26 August 1861 and operated largely in patrol activities. On two occasions in early September 1861, she carried captured runaway slaves to Craven's flagship, the gunboat USS Resolute.

On the evening of 10 September 1862, while Tigress was on patrol off Indian Head, Maryland, the steamer State of Maine collided with and sank her.

== Disposal ==
Tigress′s wreck subsequently was raised, but on 22 November 1862 she was deemed not worth the expense of repair. The wreck subsequently was sold at public auction, with half of the proceeds going to her former owner, A. C. Hall, who had raised the wreck.

== See also ==
- Union Blockade
