= USS Cactus =

Gunboat of the United States Navy

History

United States
- Ordered: as Polar Star
- Laid down: date unknown
- Launched: 1863
- Acquired: 9 December 1863
- Commissioned: 4 May 1864
- Decommissioned: 8 June 1865
- Stricken: 1865 (est.)
- Fate: To the Light House Board, 20 June 1865

General characteristics
- Tonnage: 176
- Length: 110 ft (34 m)
- Beam: 22 ft 6 in (6.86 m)
- Draught: 7 ft (2.1 m)
- Propulsion: steam engine; side-wheel propelled
- Speed: 15 knots
- Complement: not known
- Armament: one 30-pounder gun; two 12-pounder guns

USS Cactus was a steamer acquired by the Union Navy during the American Civil War for service with the Union blockade of the ports and waterways of the Confederate States of America.

She was used by the Union Navy primarily as a supply ship and as a ship's tender, but she was also equipped with heavy guns to be used as a gunboat if the need occurred.

== Service history ==
Cactus, an armed side-wheel steamer, was built during 1863 in Brooklyn, New York, as Polar Star; purchased at New York City 9 December 1863; and commissioned 4 May 1864, Acting Master N. Graham in command.

Assigned to the North Atlantic Blockading Squadron with its task of isolating the Confederacy from overseas sources of supply, Cactus served as a supply ship and tender in Hampton Roads until 28 May 1864. She was then ordered up the York River to guard the Union Army's lines of communication.

On 20 June, with USS Morse, she fought an engagement with Confederate batteries along the Pamunkey River. After assisting in covering the withdrawal of the Army from White House, Virginia, the steamer returned to Hampton Roads 23 June.

Until April 1865, Cactus operated in Hampton Roads and Chesapeake Bay towing launches and supply schooners.

She then served in the Potomac Flotilla until placed out of commission at the Washington Navy Yard 8 June 1865. Cactus was transferred to the Light House Board 20 June 1865.
