= USS Verbena =

Gunboat of the United States Navy

History

United States
- Owner: R. S. Campbell (1864); United States Navy (1864–65)
- Builder: Lawrence & Foulks (Brooklyn, NY)
- Launched: 1863
- Christened: Ino
- Acquired: 7 June 1864
- Commissioned: 11 July 1864
- Decommissioned: 13 June 1865
- Renamed: USS Verbena (1864); Game Cock (1865); Edward G. Burgess (1885)
- Stricken: 1865 (est.)
- Home port: Washington Navy Yard
- Fate: Sold, 20 July 1865

General characteristics
- Type: Tugboat
- Tonnage: 104
- Length: 74 ft (23 m)
- Beam: 12 ft 6 in (3.81 m)
- Draft: 8 ft (2.4 m)
- Propulsion: Screw propeller
- Speed: 12 mph (19 km/h)
- Armament: 1 × 20-pdr Parrott rifle; 1 × 12-pdr smoothbore

USS Verbena was a small 104-ton steamer purchased by the Union Navy towards the end of the American Civil War.

Verbena, outfitted with a 20-pounder Parrott rifle by the Navy, was placed in service as a gunboat and assigned to the blockade of the Confederate States of America. However, most of her service was as a tugboat and as a ship's tender.

== Service history ==
Verbena was originally Ino, a small wooden screw tugboat of 81 register tons, built at Brooklyn, New York by Lawrence & Foulks in 1863. She was purchased by the Navy at New York City on 7 June 1864 and commissioned at the New York Navy Yard on 11 July 1864.

On 19 July, the vessel was attached to the Potomac Flotilla for duty as a tugboat. Two days later, she deployed in the Potomac River off Point Lookout, Maryland; and she served for most of the duration of the Civil War as a tender to the ironclad USS Roanoke.

After the collapse of the Confederacy, Verbena received orders on 5 May 1865 to proceed to the Washington Navy Yard, where she was decommissioned on 13 June.

Verbena was sold at a public auction there to W. E. Gladwick on 20 July; redocumented as Game Cock on 9 September; renamed Edward G. Burgess on 7 July 1885; and dropped from the registry in 1900.

== See also ==
- Union Blockade
