= USS Sophronia =

Gunboat of the United States Navy

History

United States
- Acquired: 3 September 1861
- Commissioned: 25 January 1862
- Decommissioned: 21 August 1865
- Fate: Sold September 1865

General characteristics
- Displacement: 217 tons
- Length: 104 ft 6 in (31.85 m)
- Beam: 28 ft 4 in (8.64 m)
- Draft: 8 ft 4 in (2.54 m)
- Propulsion: schooner sail; marine steam engine
- Speed: 9.5 knots (17.6 km/h; 10.9 mph)
- Complement: 32
- Armament: 1 × 13 in (330 mm) mortar; 2 × 32-pounder guns; 2 × 12-pounder smoothbore guns

USS Sophronia was a 217-ton motorized schooner purchased by the Union Navy during the first year of the American Civil War.

The Navy outfitted Sophronia with a powerful 13 in (330 mm) mortar, for use in bombardment, and assigned her to operations on the Mississippi River where Union Navy forces were attempting to gain control of the river in order to split the Confederate States of America in two.

== Service history ==
Sophronia was purchased by the Navy at New York City from Charles Clark on 3 September 1861; and commissioned at the New York Navy Yard on 25 January 1862, Acting Master Lyman Bartholomew in command. Assigned to Comdr. David Porter's Mortar Flotilla, the schooner sailed for Key West, Florida, where the other ships of the force assembled before moving on to Ship Island, Mississippi, on 6 March. On the 18th, the mortar boats were towed across the bar at Pass a L'Outre into the Mississippi River. A month later, the flotilla moved upstream to positions below Forts Jackson and St. Philip and opened fire. Sophronia anchored some 3,000 yards from Fort Jackson and began lobbing mortar shells into the fort, at 1000, at the rate of six an hour. The bombardment continued intermittently until Admiral David Farragut had safely dashed past Forts Jackson and St. Philip on the morning of the 24th. New Orleans, Louisiana, fell to Admiral Farragut the next day, and the two forts surrendered on 28 April as they were cut off from their source of supplies and Union forces were prepared to attack them from three sides.

Early in May, Porter took his Mortar Flotilla back to the Gulf of Mexico, but they were recalled to the Mississippi River and ascended the river in June to support Farragut's operations against Vicksburg. However, General Robert E. Lee's successful Seven Days campaign prompted the U.S. Navy Department to recall some of Porter's schooners for possible service on the James River to help protect General George McClellan's beleaguered army. Sophronia arrived in Hampton Roads, Virginia, on 31 July and thereafter operated in Chesapeake Bay and on the rivers of Virginia. Sophronia was attached to the Potomac Flotilla in early 1863 and was assigned duty as a guard ship at Piney Point, Virginia. On 19 May, she captured the schooner Mignonette which was carrying contraband. In June 1864, she was one of four schooners assigned to aid a Union Army expedition up the Rappahannock River, after which she resumed her post at Piney Point. Sophronia was decommissioned at the Boston Navy Yard on 21 August 1865 and sold at auction the following month.

== See also ==
- Union Blockade
