= USS Adolph Hugel =

Gunboat of the United States Navy

History

United States
- Name: USS Adolph Hugel
- Laid down: date unknown
- Launched: 1860 in Philadelphia, Pennsylvania
- Acquired: 21 September 1861
- Commissioned: circa 11 January 1862
- Decommissioned: 17 June 1865 at the Washington Navy Yard
- Stricken: 1865 (est.)
- Fate: Sold, 20 July 1865

General characteristics
- Type: Schooner
- Displacement: 269 long tons (273 t)
- Length: 114 ft (35 m)
- Beam: 29 ft (8.8 m)
- Draft: 9 ft (2.7 m)
- Depth of hold: 10 ft (3.0 m)
- Propulsion: Schooner sail
- Speed: varied
- Complement: 31
- Armament: 1 × 13 in (330 mm) mortar, 2 × 32-pounder smoothbore guns

USS Adolph Hugel was a schooner acquired by the Union Navy during the American Civil War.

With her two 32-pounder guns, she was intended for use by the Union Navy as a gunboat in support of the Union Navy blockade of Confederate waterways. However, she also had installed on board a heavy 13 in (330 mm) mortar, useful for shore bombardment.

== Constructed at Philadelphia in 1860 ==
Adolph Hugel – a schooner built at Philadelphia, Pennsylvania, in 1860 – was purchased there by Captain Samuel Francis Du Pont on 21 September 1861 to participate in his impending expedition against Port Royal, South Carolina, and then to serve in the South Atlantic Blockading Squadron which he hoped to base at that port.

== Delayed in commissioning due to construction problems ==
However, delays in fitting out the schooner prevented her from taking part in the Port Royal operation and caused her to be reassigned twice before her active service began: first to Flag Officer William W. McKeon's Gulf Blockading Squadron and then, on 2 December 1861, to the Mortar Flotilla established under Commander David Dixon Porter to support Farragut's forthcoming campaign against New Orleans, Louisiana, and the lower Mississippi River.

== Civil War operations ==
=== Commissioned and ordered to the Mississippi ===
Commissioned on or before 11 January 1862, Adolph Hugel finally departed Chester, Pennsylvania, on 13 January 1862 and proceeded to Hampton Roads, Virginia, in company with sister schooner George Mangham.

From that port, she proceeded via Hampton Roads, Virginia; Key West, Florida; and Ship Island, Mississippi, to the Mississippi Delta which she reached on 18 March. Upon arriving there, she was promptly towed over the bar off the mouth of Pass a l'Outre and into the river. For the next month, while Farragut labored to get his deep-draft, saltwater warships into the Mississippi River, Porter kept his vessels busy preparing to support the flag officer's thrust upstream.

=== Bombardment of Forts Jackson and St. Philip ===
On the morning of 18 April, Adolph Hugel opened fire on Fort Jackson which, with Fort St. Philip across the river, protected New Orleans from seaborne attack. She and her sister schooner kept up the shelling for over two hours before ceasing fire at noon. Thereafter, Porter's mortars intermittently bombarded the Confederate fortifications. Their firing reached its peak in the pre-dawn darkness of the 24th when Farragut's fleet dashed upstream, passed the forts, and the next day took New Orleans. Four days later, the forts surrendered.

Originally, similar operations against Mobile, Alabama, were next on the mortar flotilla's agenda; and Adolph Hugel and her sisters dropped downriver and returned to the Gulf of Mexico to await Farragut who was to join them in attacking that port. Meanwhile, however, new orders from Washington sent Farragut back upstream to join Flag Officer Charles Henry Davis' Western Flotilla which had been fighting down the Mississippi River from Cairo, Illinois.

=== Providing a mortar attack on the fortress at Vicksburg ===
When these instructions reached the flag officer, he had just returned to New Orleans from Vicksburg, Mississippi, where he had found Confederate cannon which could shell his ships with near impunity, because their location high on the cliffs kept them out of the field of fire of the Union Navy's low trajectory guns. He, therefore, called the Mortar Flotilla back to the river to neutralize the Southern batteries as he raced past Vicksburg to meet Davis. Thus, late in June, Adolph. Hugel found herself and her sisters just below the Confederate river fortress; and, on the 28th, they shelled the hillside batteries as Farragut's salt water men-of-war ran the gauntlet.

=== Reassigned to the James River to support beleaguered Union Army ===
However, events were taking place in Virginia which would shorten Adolph Hugel's service on the Mississippi River. General Robert E. Lee's Army of Northern Virginia had defeated the North's Army of the Potomac in the Seven Days campaign, driving it across the peninsula between the York and the James and penning it up in a somewhat precarious beachhead at Harrison's Landing on the north bank of the latter river.

There, Union gunboats protected each flank of the beleaguered Northern army; and, the Federal War Department felt that mortar boats would be ideal weapons to augment naval firepower on the James and, in this way, to increase the security of the besieged Federal troops. As a result, in compliance with an Army request, Secretary of the Navy, Gideon Welles, called 12 of Porter's schooners back to the east coast for duty on the vital Virginia river.

=== Adolph Hugel arrives, but needs repairs ===
Adolph Hugel – one of the mortar boats brought back to the Atlantic Ocean coast – reached Hampton Roads on 31 July. However, when she arrived there, she was in serious need of repairs. Thus, instead of ascending the James to bolster Union strength at Harrison's Landing she soon continued on north for yard work at Baltimore, Maryland.

=== Reassigned to defend the Nation's capital on the Potomac ===
The patching kept her out of action into the autumn. By the time she was back in fighting trim, the Army of the Potomac had evacuated the peninsula and had moved north to help to defend Washington. Lee's army had routed General John Pope's troops in the Second Battle of Bull Run, had invaded Maryland, and was a threat to the Federal capital. Thus, Adolph Hugel's capabilities were no longer required on the James, but were urgently needed near Washington.

=== Serving on the Potomac River ===
Consequently, the schooner was assigned to the Potomac Flotilla and began patrolling the river between Washington and Aquia Creek in early autumn. She subsequently served on various stations in that command through the end of the Civil War. Her efforts were devoted primarily to stopping illicit trade between Maryland and Virginia while acting as a guard ship at Alexandria, Virginia. Her accomplishments were small; but their cumulative effect, added to the work of many sister Union warships, was significant in helping to weaken the South.

=== An April Fools' Day capture of a load of whiskey ===
The schooner's first capture was almost comical in that it took place on April Fool's Day, 1863; and the prize was a "... hastily abandoned ..." boat loaded with whiskey.

This action was a sample of victories to come, for much of her work was devoted to checking the Civil War's version of bootlegging or carrying alcoholic beverages. On 20 July, she took another liquor-laden boat with a two-man crew. On 17 September, she made a prize of the sloop Music; and on 3 December 1863, she captured the schooner F. U. Johnson. This vessel's general cargo included a large quantity of distilled spirits.

=== And more whiskey ===
On the night of 6 February 1864, a small boat attempted to pass Adolph Hugel and did not reply to repeated hails from the guard vessel. Acting in accordance with standing orders, the schooner's commanding officer fired at the boat's only occupant, wounding him. The boat sank alongside, and its captors threw its cargo of whiskey overboard.

=== Adolph Hugel asked to defend Alexandria from Jubal Early ===
During Confederate General Jubal Early's Washington raid in July 1864, the Military Governor of Alexandria requested Adolph Hugel's help in defending his city in the event of an attack. However, before Early reached Washington, heavy reinforcements arrived at Fort Stevens, which guarded the northwestern approaches to the Federal capital, prompting Early to withdraw.

On 28 October 1864, the schooner took her last prize, the sloop James Landry which was carrying a general cargo and six passengers.

== Post-war decommissioning and sale ==
Following the end of hostilities, Adolph Hugel was decommissioned at the Washington Navy Yard on 17 June 1865. She was sold at public auction there on 20 July to a gentleman named Robinson.
