= USS Reliance =

Gunboat of the United States Navy

Coordinates: 40.440°N 74.197°W

History

United States
- Laid down: 1860
- Launched: 1860
- Acquired: 7 May 1861
- Commissioned: 13 May 1861
- Out of service: 28 August 1863
- Stricken: est. 1863
- Captured: By Confederate forces, 23 August 1863
- Fate: Destroyed by Confederate forces; to prevent recapture

General characteristics
- Displacement: 90 tons
- Length: 88 ft 2 in (26.87 m)
- Beam: 17 ft (5.2 m)
- Draught: 7 ft 5 in (2.26 m)
- Propulsion: steam engine
- Speed: not known
- Complement: unknown
- Armament: one 24-pounder howitzer, one 12-pounder howitzer

USS Reliance was a steamer acquired by the United States Navy for use during the American Civil War. Her duties included river patrols and bombarding with her howitzers.

== Construction and acquisition ==
Reliance, a wooden screw steamer built in 1860 at Keyport, New Jersey, by Benjamin C. Terry, was purchased by the navy at New York City on 7 May 1861; and commissioned there on 13 May 1861, Acting Lt. Jared P. K. Mygatt in command.

== Assigned to the Potomac Flotilla ==
Assigned to the Potomac Flotilla, she began her active service by blockading the Virginia side of the Potomac River. From 29 May to 1 June 1861, she joined in attacks against Confederate positions at Aquia Creek, Virginia. On 20 June she engaged Rebel batteries at Marlborough Point, Virginia; and a week later she fought Confederate forces at Mathias Point, Virginia.

Reliance patrolled the river, searching for smuggled supplies, runaway slaves, and deserting Confederate soldiers. On 12 August 1862, she captured the sloop, Blossom, and sent a boat expedition into Sturgeon Creek. She seized the sloop Painter off Alexandria, Virginia, 30 October and took the longboat, New Moon, on 24 November carrying contraband cargo.

== Reliance is captured by Confederate raiders ==
Along with other boats of the Flotilla, she cooperated in operations with troops of the Army of the Potomac along the Rappahannock River. During these operations, Reliance service was ended by a daring Confederate raid. On 12 August 1863, Lt. John Taylor Wood, CSN, led 80 Rebel troops with six boats loaded on wagons secretly overland to the Rappahannock; concealing themselves by day, the raiders searched the river by night and found Reliance and USS Satellite anchored off Windmill Point at the mouth of the river. On 23 August, Wood's men surprised, boarded, and captured the two Federal gunboats.

== Reliance is destroyed to prevent its recapture by the Union Navy ==
The Southerners took their two prizes to Port Royal, Virginia. There they were destroyed on 28 August to prevent their recapture by approaching Union cavalry under Gen. Hugh Judson Kilpatrick.

== See also ==
- Union Blockade
- U.S. Revenue Cutter Service
