= USS Little Ada =

Gunboat of the United States Navy

History

United States
- Acquired: 18 August 1864
- Commissioned: 5 October 1864
- Decommissioned: 24 June 1865
- Captured: by Union Navy forces; 30 March 1864
- Fate: Transferred to the War Department 12 August 1865

General characteristics
- Displacement: 150 tons
- Length: 112 ft (34 m)
- Beam: 12 ft 6 in (3.81 m)
- Draft: 8 ft (2.4 m)
- Propulsion: steam engine; screw-propelled
- Speed: 10 knots (19 km/h; 12 mph)
- Armament: two 20-pounder Parrott rifles

USS Little Ada was a steamer captured by the Union Navy during the American Civil War. She was used by the Navy to patrol navigable waterways of the Confederacy to prevent the South from trading with other countries.

== Service history ==
Little Ada, an iron screw steamer, was built in the Clyde, Scotland; captured and abandoned in the South Santee River 30 March 1864; recaptured at sea by Gettysburg 9 July 1864; purchased by the Union Navy from the Boston Prize Court 18 August 1864; and commissioned at Boston, Massachusetts, 5 October 1864. Acting Master Samuel P. Craft in command. After fitting out, Little Ada was ordered to the Western Bar, Cape Fear River, 8 November 1864. In December she participated in the attacks on Fort Fisher. Little Ada’s most active service was in 1865. She formed part of the separate line of the North Atlantic Blockading Squadron 3 January landing provisions for the Union Army. She again participated in attacks on Fort Fisher 13 to 15 January, carrying dispatches through the fleet. After being assigned to the Potomac Flotilla 10 March, she captured a large yard boat 9 April at Hooper Strait, Maryland. She was sent to the Washington Navy Yard 31 May 1865, decommissioned 24 June 1865, and was transferred to the War Department 12 August 1865.
