= USS Dan Smith =

History

United States
- Acquired: 7 September 1861
- Commissioned: 30 January 1862
- Decommissioned: 28 June 1865
- Fate: Sold, 10 August 1865

General characteristics
- Displacement: 150 tons
- Length: 87 ft 9 in (26.75 m)
- Beam: 25 ft 2 in (7.67 m)
- Draft: 8 ft 2 in (2.49 m)
- Propulsion: sail
- Complement: 33
- Armament: two 32-pounder guns

USS Dan Smith was a schooner used by the Union Navy during the American Civil War. She was used by the Navy to patrol navigable waterways of the Confederacy to prevent the South from trading with other countries.

== Service history ==
Dan Smith, a wooden sailing schooner, was purchased by the Navy at New York City 7 September 1861; outfitted at New York Navy Yard; and commissioned 30 January 1862, Acting Master G. W. Brown in command. Assigned to duty in the newly organized Mortar Flotilla, she sailed from New York 4 February 1862, arriving on station at the mouth of the Mississippi River on 11 March. During her service in this area she joined in the bombardment and capture of Fort Jackson and Fort St. Philip from 18 to 24 April 1862; took part in the passage of the batteries at, and shelling of, Vicksburg, Mississippi, from 26 June to 5 July 1862; and had frequent encounters with other enemy shore batteries.

Repaired at Baltimore, Maryland, in the summer of 1862 Dan Smith sailed for duty with the Potomac Flotilla 25 October. From 30 October to 22 July 1863 the schooner cruised the Potomac, Rappahannock, and Piankatank Rivers and various creeks of Virginia on guard and picket duty. She shared in the capture of the schooner Emily Murray 9 February 1863 and captured many small craft used to carry contraband goods across the Potomac. On 22 July 1863 Dan Smith entered Washington Navy Yard to prepare for duty with the South Atlantic Blockading Squadron. On 28 July 1863 Dan Smith stood down the Potomac River and arrived off Charleston, South Carolina, 9 August, in time to take part in an assault on Fort Wagner and Fort Gregg 9 days later. She served in the coastal waters of South Carolina and Georgia during the remainder of the War, capturing the schooner Sophia in Altamaha Sound, Georgia, 3 March 1864. From 9 to 14 February 1865 she cooperated with the Union Army in an expedition up Folly River, South Carolina. She set sail for Philadelphia, Pennsylvania, 6 June 1865 arriving 9 days later. There Dan Smith was decommissioned 28 June 1865 and sold 10 August 1865.
