= USS Island Belle =

Tugboat of the United States Navy

Coordinates: 37.304°N 77.135°W

History

United States
- Name: USS Island Belle
- Acquired: 4 September 1861
- Commissioned: 17 September 1861
- Fate: Ran aground and burned, 28 June 1862

General characteristics
- Type: Tugboat/Collier
- Displacement: 123 long tons (125 t)
- Length: 100 ft (30 m)
- Beam: 20 ft 4 in (6.20 m)
- Draft: 6 ft 7 in (2.01 m)
- Propulsion: steam engine
- Armament: 1 × 32-pounder gun, 1 × 12-pounder rifle

USS Island Belle was a large tugboat acquired by the Union Navy during the American Civil War. Although carrying relatively heavy weaponry, she was used for unassuming tasks, such as carrying dispatches and providing surveillance. When she ran aground in unfriendly waters, she was burned to prevent her falling into the hands of the Confederate forces.

== Service history ==
Island Belle was purchased at New York City from Luther Adams on 4 September 1861. She fitted out at Washington Navy Yard and sailed on 17 September to join the Potomac Flotilla. She served in the Potomac as a tug and a dispatch boat occasionally exchanging fire with batteries and riflemen on the Virginia shore. She sailed to Hampton Roads, Virginia on 19 March 1862, escorting transports carrying troops to Fort Monroe in preparation for the Peninsular campaign against Richmond, Virginia. She returned to Washington, D.C., as soon as the soldiers were disembarked and again got underway for Hampton Roads escorting a second division of transports on 23 March. Island Belle devoted most of April and May to reconnaissance work, searching the Virginia rivers between Washington and Richmond for information valuable to either the Army or the Navy.

Island Belle was transferred to the North Atlantic Blockading Squadron on 22 May. Two days later, Flag Officer Goldborough assigned her to duty in the James River where the Navy was valiantly supporting the left flank of General George B. McClellan's mighty force as it advanced up the peninsula toward Richmond. She steamed up the James on 25 May, carefully observing the river banks to detect any signs of Confederate military activity. When she joined Commander William Smith, the senior naval officer on the James, he used Island Belle in a wide variety of ways. He sent her on reconnaissance missions to learn about enemy defenses in the Chickahominy River and other tributaries of the James; he entrusted her with his messages to General McClellan and to the other ships of his command; he used her to carry coal to the hungry furnaces of his steamships; and he kept her on call to help refloat ships which often ran aground in the tricky and ever-changing currents of the river.

On 26 June, Island Belle steamed up the shallow Appomattox River in an attempt to destroy the railroad bridge at Petersburg, Virginia. The next day, she ran hard aground. After strenuous efforts failed to refloat her, Island Belle was burned on 28 June 1862 to prevent her falling into Confederate hands.
