= USS Dragon =

Gunboat of the United States Navy

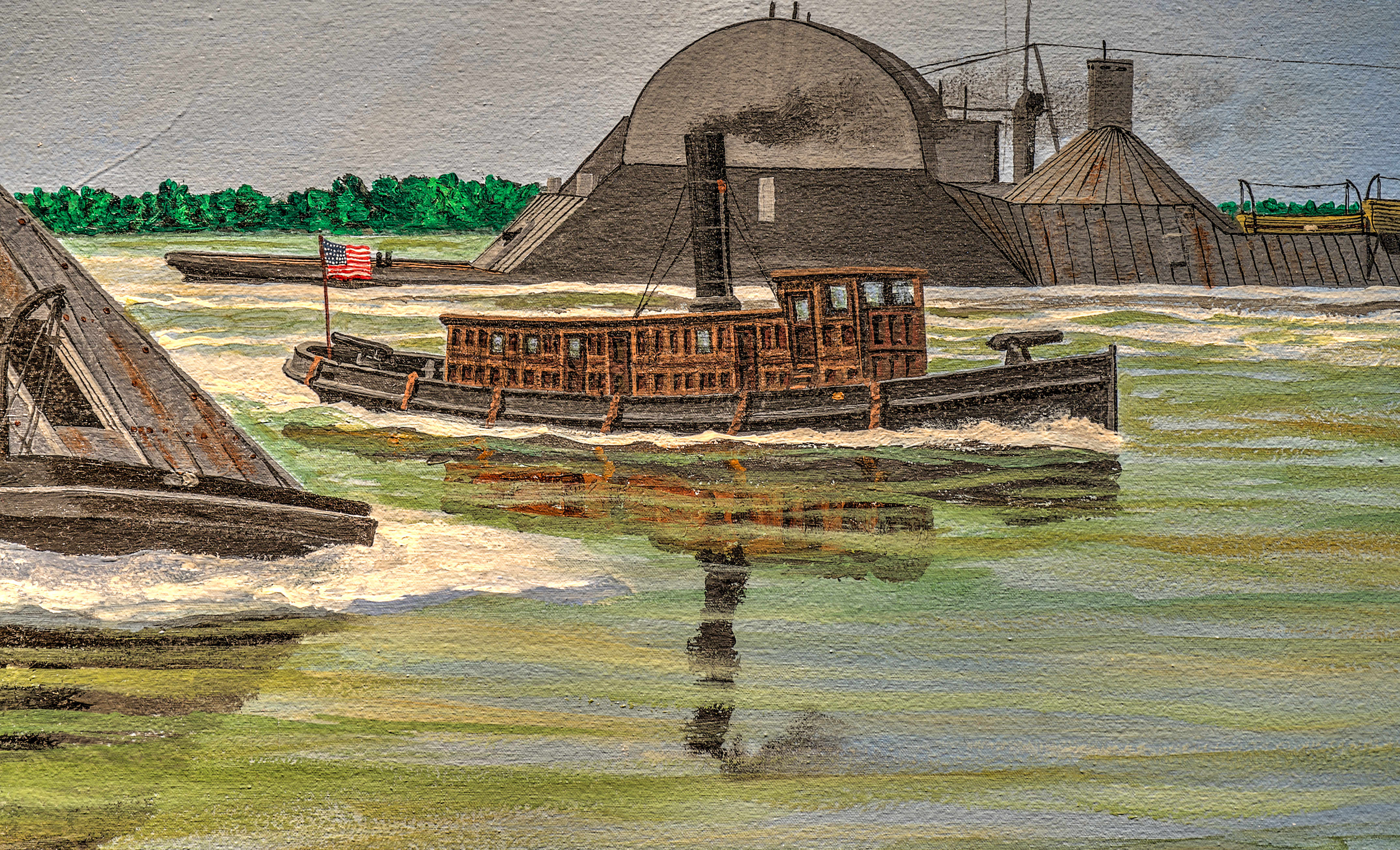
- Painting of USS Dragon at the National Civil War Naval Museum

History

United States
- Acquired: December 1861
- Commissioned: 20 December 1861
- Decommissioned: 13 May 1865
- Fate: Sold 20 July 1865

General characteristics
- Displacement: 118 tons
- Length: 17 ft (5.2 m)
- Beam: 7 ft 6 in (2.29 m)
- Propulsion: steam engine; screw-propelled
- Complement: 42
- Armament: one 30-pounder rifled gun, one 24-pounder smoothbore gun

USS Dragon was a small 118-ton steamer acquired by the Union Navy during the start of the American Civil War.

Dragon's primary assignment was to participate as a gunboat in the Union blockade of the ports and waterways of the Confederate States of America.

== Service history ==
Dragon, a screw steamer, was purchased at New York City in December 1861; outfitted at New York Navy Yard; and sailed 20 December 1861, Acting Master W. Watson in command, to join the North Atlantic Blockading Squadron at Hampton Roads, Virginia. Dragon was assigned to the James River Flotilla to attend USS Cumberland and USS Congress to give them aid in case of attack by the Confederate ironclad CSS Virginia (ex-USS Merrimack). On 8 March 1862 Dragon participated in the famous engagement in Hampton Roads between United States and Confederate naval forces during which Cumberland and Congress were sunk by the ironclad Virginia.

When the battle was renewed the following day Dragon endeavored to get USS Minnesota afloat but was halted when a shot from one of Virginia's rifled guns entered her boiler, exploding and causing severe damage. She was sent to Baltimore, Maryland, for repairs. Returning to Hampton Roads 22 April 1862, Dragon was again assigned to duty with the James River Flotilla and continued to patrol in the James until 29 August 1862 when she was transferred to the Potomac Flotilla. She patrolled the Potomac and Rappahannock Rivers helping enforce the blockade between Maryland and Virginia until 25 April 1865. Dragon arrived at Washington Navy Yard the following day, was decommissioned there 13 May 1865 and sold 20 July 1865.

== See also ==
- Confederate States Navy
