= USS Primrose =

Gunboat of the United States Navy

History

United States
- Acquired: 14 January 1863
- Commissioned: 26 February 1863
- Decommissioned: 1871
- Fate: Sold, 17 March 1871

General characteristics
- Displacement: 94 tons
- Length: 83 ft (25 m)
- Beam: 17 ft (5.2 m)
- Draft: 7 ft (2.1 m)
- Depth of hold: 9"
- Propulsion: steam engine, screw
- Armament: one 30-pounder rifled gun, one 24-pounder howitzer

USS Primrose, a screw steamer tugboat originally named Nellie B. Vaughn, armed with a heavy rifled gun and a howitzer capable of dropping a 24-pound ball, was acquired by the Union Navy during the American Civil War.

== Service history ==
The tug Nellie B. Vaughn, a wooden screw steamer, was purchased on 14 January 1863, at Washington, D.C., and was renamed Primrose; fitted out at the Washington Navy Yard; and commissioned 26 February 1863, acting Master Street in command. Assigned to the Potomac Flotilla for duty in the Potomac River and adjacent waters, Primrose participated in operations in the Nansemond River in April and in the Curritoman in May. On 2 June, with USS Anacostia, she took the sloop Flying Cloud at Tapp's Creek, Virginia, then on the 20th captured the sloop Richard Vaux off Blakistone Island in the Potomac River. Laid up for repairs in February 1864, Primose returned to active duty in April, remaining with the Potomac River forces until 1866. Then assigned to the Washington Navy Yard, she remained active until 1871, when she was placed in ordinary. She was sold at Washington to J. W. Denty, 17 March 1871.

== See also ==
- Union Blockade
