= USS Heliotrope =

Wooden steamer of the Union Navy

History

United States
- Ordered: as Maggie Baker
- Acquired: 16 December 1863
- Commissioned: 24 April 1864
- Decommissioned: 12 January 1865
- Fate: Sold 17 June 1865 to the Department of the Treasury

General characteristics
- Displacement: 239 tons
- Length: 134 ft (41 m)
- Beam: 24 ft 6 in (7.47 m)
- Draft: 6 ft 8 in (2.03 m)
- Propulsion: steam engine; side wheel-propelled
- Speed: 6 knots (11 km/h; 6.9 mph)
- Armament: one 12-pounder gun

USS Heliotrope was a wooden steamer originally named Maggie Baker, which was acquired by the Union Navy for use during the American Civil War. In addition to patrol duty, Heliotrope performed other services, such as towing and dispatch running.

== Service history ==
Heliotrope, a wooden steamer, was originally named Maggie Baker, and was purchased by the Navy from her owner, Stacey Pitcher, at New York City on 16 December 1863. Renamed Heliotrope, she commissioned at New York Navy Yard 24 April 1864. Heliotrope was assigned initially to the North Atlantic Blockading Squadron, and sailed soon after her commissioning to Hampton Roads, Virginia, where she served as a tug and ordnance boat. She continued this duty with occasional patrols up the James River, until her transfer to the Potomac Flotilla 23 January 1865. Heliotrope reported for her new duties early in February, and participated 6–8 March in a joint expedition up the Rappahannock River to Fredericksburg, Virginia. In cooperation with Army units, Heliotrope and the other gunboats succeeded in destroying railroad facilities, a large quantity of track, and a depot of army supplies.

Returning to routine patrolling in the Potomac River, she embarked with other gunboats on another expedition 16 March, sending her small boats with about 50 men up Mattox Creek. Three schooners and various types of supplies were captured or destroyed on this 2-day foray. The small gunboat continued her vital work of choking off Confederate supplies in the Potomac River area until mid-April, when she steamed for New York City, arriving 20 April. Heliotrope decommissioned 12 January 1865 and was sold 17 June to the Department of the Treasury for use with the Lighthouse Service.
