= USS Currituck (1843) =

Gunboat of the United States Navy

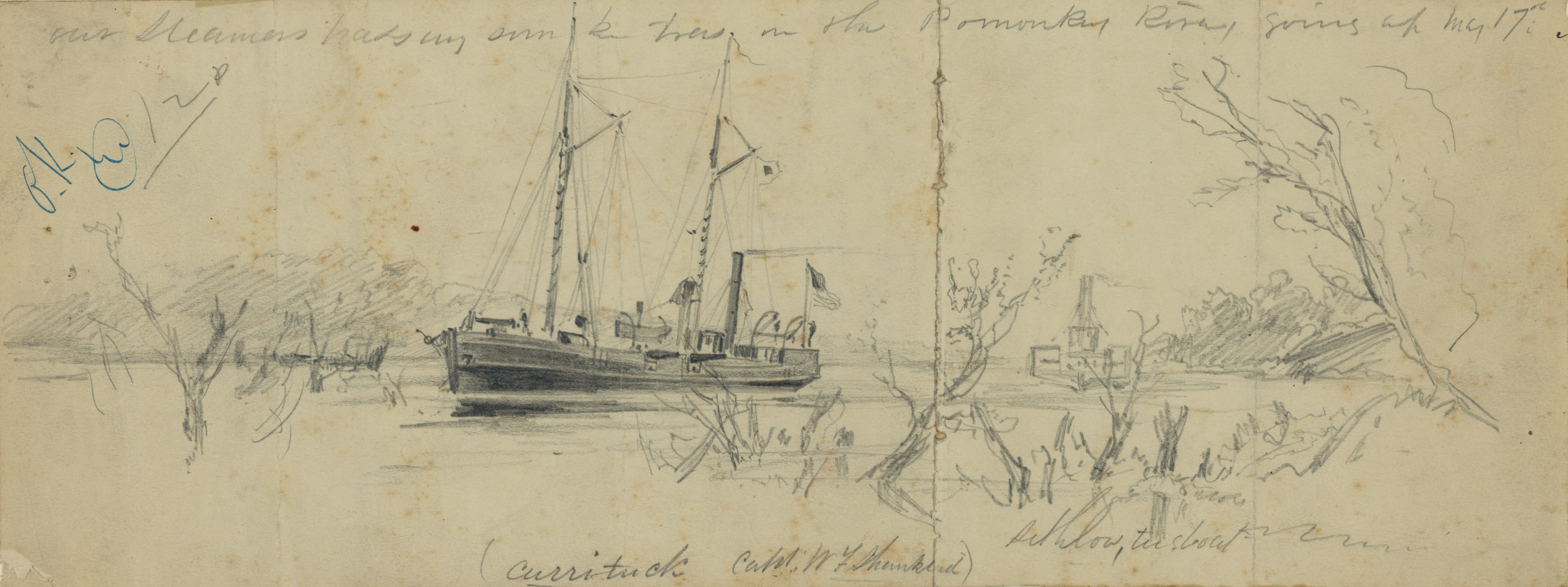
- An illustration of USS Currituck (foreground) and the tug Seth Low on their expedition up the Pamunkey River in Virginia, 17 May 1862

History

United States
- Name: USS Currituck
- Christened: Not known; former name Seneca
- Completed: 1843
- Acquired: (by USN): 20 Sep 1861
- Commissioned: 27 Feb 1862
- Decommissioned: 4 Aug 1865
- Renamed: USS Currituck (1861); Arlington (1865)
- Stricken: 1865
- Fate: Burned at Mobile, Alabama, 23 November 1870

General characteristics
- Displacement: 195 tons
- Length: 120 ft (37 m)
- Beam: 23 ft (7.0 m)
- Draught: 7 ft 6 in (2.29 m)
- Propulsion: steam engine, screw
- Complement: 52
- Armament: four 32-pounder guns, one 20 pounder rifled gun

USS Currituck was a steamer acquired by the Union Navy for use during the American Civil War. Her duties as a gunboat included river patrols, guard duty, and other duties as assigned.

== Purchase and commission ==
A wooden-hulled, screw-propelled steamer, the ship was built in New York City in 1843. She was purchased by the US Navy 20 September 1861 at New York City while under the name Seneca; renamed Currituck; fitted for service at New York Navy Yard; and commissioned 27 February 1862, Acting Master W. F. Shankland in command. On 31 March 1862, Thomas G. Hale was appointed by the Secretary of the Navy as acting Master of Currituck.

== Service history ==
Currituck was ordered to tow USS Monitor to Hampton Roads as soon as possible so that the revolutionary new ironclad might confront CSS Virginia (ex-USS Merrimack). Departing New York City on 6 March, Currituck and Monitor arrived Hampton Roads 8 March, beginning the Battle of Hampton Roads.

Assigned to duty with the Potomac Flotilla, Currituck spent her entire service in the Chesapeake Bay and its tributary waters cooperating with Army movements ashore. She performed guard and picket duty, capturing or destroying Confederate property and engaging Southern land forces frequently.

Between 4 May 1862 and 21 October 1863, she took eight vessels and aided in cutting out another, as well as capturing the fort at the confluence of the Pamunkey River and the Mattapony River and military stores at Carter's Creek.

Throughout the remainder of the Civil War, she cruised constantly up and down the inland waters of Virginia and in Chesapeake Bay convoying transports and hospital boats with sick and wounded from Fredericksburg, Virginia, sending scouting parties ashore from time to time.

Arriving at Washington, D.C., 31 July 1865, Currituck was decommissioned 4 August 1865 and sold 15 September 1865. The ship subsequently went into service as the merchant ship Arlington. Arlington was destroyed by a fire at Mobile, Alabama, on 23 November 1870.
