= USS Jacob Bell =

Gunboat of the United States Navy

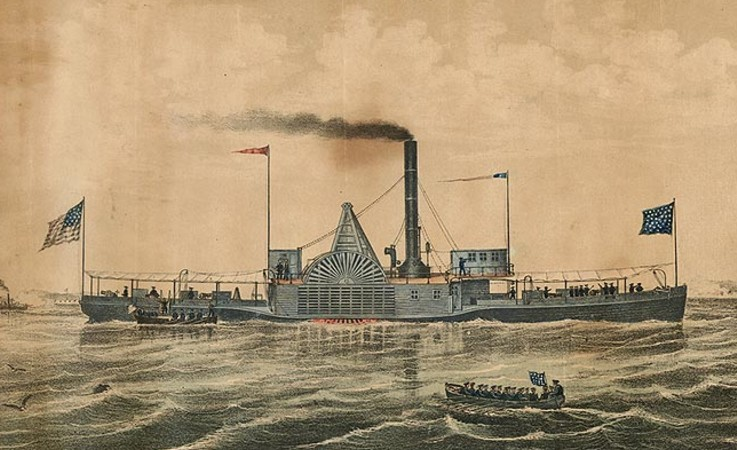
- Colored lithograph of the Jacob Bell, published circa the 1860s.

History

United States
- Name: USS Jacob Bell
- Namesake: Co-proprietor of the shipbuilder
- Builder: Brown & Bell (New York)
- Completed: 1842
- Acquired: 22 August 1861, for $12,000
- Commissioned: 22 August 1861
- Decommissioned: 13 May 1865 at the Washington Navy Yard
- Stricken: 1865 (est.)
- Fate: Lost at sea, 6 November 1865

General characteristics
- Tons burthen: 229
- Length: 141 ft 3 in (43.05 m)
- Beam: 21 ft (6.4 m)
- Depth of hold: 8 ft 1 in (2.46 m)
- Propulsion: steam engine, side wheel-propelled
- Complement: 49
- Armament: one 8" Dahlgren smoothbore gun; one 32-pounder gun

USS Jacob Bell was a sidewheel steamer acquired by the Union Navy for use during the American Civil War. She was one of the oldest vessels so acquired. Her duties included river patrols, guard duty, and other duties as assigned.

== Commissioned in New York City ==
Jacob Bell, was built by Brown & Bell at New York City in 1842. She was purchased at New York City from O. T. Glover and F. R. Anthony on 22 August 1861 and commissioned the same day; Lt. Edward P. McCrea was in command.

=== Potomac River operations ===
Jacob Bell immediately sailed for the Potomac River, where the following day she joined steamer USS Ice Boat (1861) in shelling a Confederate battery at the mouth of Potomac Creek. She remained in the Potomac enforcing the blockade of the Virginia coast, reconnoitering along the shore of the Potomac and in its tributaries for Confederate fortifications and shelling any batteries found.

=== Supporting McClellan's Peninsular Campaign ===
In April 1862 Jacob Bell accompanied five other Union ships to the Rappahannock River to gather information for Major General George B. McClellan, who was then launching his Peninsular Campaign and pondering over potential advantages of a second beachhead. The Union ships ascended the Rappahannock River to Tappahannock (Urbana, Virginia), 50 miles by land from Richmond, Virginia.

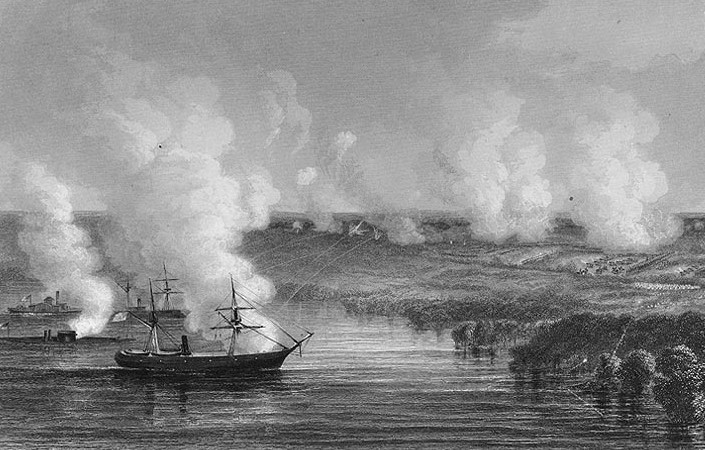
Illustration depicting the ironclads Monitor and Galena bombarding Confederate forces as General McClellan's army withdraws following the Battle of Malvern Hill, 2 July 1862. The other two ships visible are probably USS Aroostook (beyond Monitor's bow) and USS Jacob Bell (behind Monitor, at left).

Jacob Bell became even more closely involved in the affairs of General McClellan's Army of the Potomac when she was transferred to the North Atlantic Blockading Squadron for duty on the James River. She arrived Hampton Roads 28 May and the following day proceeded with USS Mahaska (1861) to Fort Powhatan. A party which went ashore 30 May found no evidence that the forts had been occupied. The next day USS Aroostook (1861) joined the two ships in ascending the James to a point 3 miles below Drewry's Bluff, finding no obstructions or batteries on the passage but suffering some annoyance from riflemen on the left bank. The three ships promptly returned to their anchorage off Turkey Island.

=== A request from General McClellan ===
A message from General McClellan, who was then fighting the Battle of Seven Pines, arrived a few minutes past midnight 2 June, requesting support from the Navy. Jacob Bell, accompanied by five other ships stood up stream at dawn but was prevented from reaching Richmond, Virginia, by carefully prepared obstructions at Drewry's Bluff. Nevertheless, the Navy wisely remained in the upper James, where its support a month later saved the Army of the Potomac from destruction at the end of Lee's masterful Seven Days campaign.

Meanwhile, Jacob Bell labored tirelessly in support of the Union cause, engaging batteries and pickets ashore, reconnoitering tributaries in hostile territory, and maintaining communications along the river. She continued this valuable service until transferred back to the Potomac Flotilla, departing Fort Monroe for Washington, D.C. 2 September.

=== Reassigned to the Potomac Flotilla ===
For the remainder of the war, Jacob Bell was primarily concerned with the defense of Washington—alternately serving in the Potomac and the Rappahannock according to the ebb and flow of the titanic struggle between General Robert E. Lee and the Army of the Potomac. All the while, her duties as a blockader were discharged with skill and devotion. She captured C. F. Ward, a metal lifeboat with a contraband cargo 17 October and destroyed two schooners 4 November while on a reconnaissance mission up Nomini Creek, Virginia. On 23 August 1863, she caught schooner Golden Leaf trying to slip into Hosier's Creek, Virginia, with a cargo of sugar. Two more ships were taken in 1864.

In between prizes, blockade duty was varied by shelling batteries along the shore and landing boat parties to destroy Confederate property.

Confederate scout and spy Thomas Nelson Conrad was arrested by a landing party of the Jacob Bell on the night of 16 April 1865.

== Decommissioning ==
Always busy until the South's defeat, Jacob Bell decommissioned at Washington Navy Yard 13 May 1865, and was lost at sea 6 November while being towed by USS Banshee (1862) toward New York City.
