= USS George Mangham =

Gunboat of the United States Navy

History

United States
- Launched: 1854
- Acquired: 21 September 1861
- Commissioned: 11 January 1862
- Decommissioned: 9 September 1865
- Fate: Sold, 27 September 1865

General characteristics
- Displacement: 274 tons
- Length: 110 ft (34 m)
- Beam: 28 ft (8.5 m)
- Depth of hold: 10 ft (3.0 m)
- Propulsion: schooner sail
- Speed: 10 knots (19 km/h; 12 mph)
- Armament: 1 × 13 in (330 mm) mortar; 2 × 32-pounder guns

USS George Mangham was a schooner acquired by the Union Navy during the American Civil War. She was used by the Union Navy as a gunboat in support of the Union Navy blockade of Confederate waterways.

== Service history ==
George Mangham was a wooden schooner built in 1854; purchased by the Navy at Philadelphia, Pennsylvania, 21 September 1861; and commissioned at the Philadelphia Navy Yard 11 January 1862, Acting Master John Collins Jr., in command. George Mangham departed Chester, Pennsylvania, 13 January for duty with Comdr. David Dixon Porter's Mortar Flotilla, a part of the West Gulf Blockading Squadron. Sailing via Hampton Roads, Virginia, she arrived Key West, Florida, 13 February. From there she sailed 6 March with Porter's ships to the mouth of the Mississippi River to prepare for the important assault on Forts Jackson and St. Philip, which guarded the approaches to New Orleans, Louisiana. George Mangham and the other mortar boats crossed the bar into the Mississippi River 18 March.

After Farragut's meticulous preparations had been completed, the Mortar Flotilla, including George Mangham, began the bombardment of Fort Jackson 18 April and sustained the fierce cannonade for 5 days. George Mangham was with the second division, anchored on the east bank of the river. As the swift current slackened 24 April, Farragut's fleet steamed boldly through the gap in the obstructions and past the forts through a hail of shell, engaging and capturing a large Confederate flotilla. The mortar schooners shelled the forts at rapid fire to support the movement, and George Mangham received a shot through her hull in the engagement. Flag Officer Farragut, having passed the major Confederate defenses on the river below New Orleans, Louisiana, captured that city 25 April, opening the way for Union naval forces to sweep up the Mississippi River. George Mangham and the rest of the mortar ships remained below the battered forts, which surrendered 28 April.

George Mangham, however, departed for Florida 27 April and spent the next month cruising the Pensacola, Florida, area. Comdr. Porter again assembled his fleet at Pensacola and sailed 3 June to support the Union movement up the Mississippi; arriving off Vicksburg, Mississippi, 20 June, she assisted in the passage of the batteries there. Supported strongly by the mortar bombardment, Farragut steamed past the formidable Confederate works 28 June to join with Commodore Davis further up the river. Subsequently, George Mangham returned downriver, engaging Confederate artillery on the riverbank from time to time. After passing Grand Gulf, Mississippi, she arrived Baton Rouge, Louisiana, 12 July. From there she proceeded to Hampton Roads, Virginia, where she moored 30 July. Remaining at Hampton Roads until 29 August, George Mangham first proceeded to Baltimore, Maryland, then served as a guard ship on the Potomac River at Piney Point, Maryland. The schooner was assigned to the Potomac Flotilla 22 December; and until 10 July 1863, she suppressed blockage runners, capturing four prizes in the lower Potomac. She was then taken to the Washington Navy Yard and fitted out for cruising in the Gulf of St. Lawrence.

Authorities in Washington, D.C. were greatly concerned about the attacks of Confederate raiders, and George Mangham was chosen to protect American merchantmen and fishing craft. Leaving Washington 5 August, she cruised off the Magdalen Islands and Prince Edward Island; without detecting any Confederate ships, she departed Georgetown, Prince Edward Island, 5 November for New York Navy Yard. After repairs at New York City, George Mangham sailed 9 December to join the South Atlantic Blockading Squadron for blockading duty off Murrells Inlet, South Carolina. While engaged in this work, on 7 January 1864 she moved close to shore and destroyed Dare, a beached blockade runner driven ashore by larger Union ships. She then steamed to Charleston, South Carolina, 21 March and continued the vital work of blockading the South Carolina coast in the vicinity of Cape Romain, St. Helena Sound, and Bull's Bay during the remainder of the year. Returning to Port Royal, South Carolina, 5 January 1865, George Mangham was reassigned temporarily to Key West, Florida, in March. Subsequently, she returned to the New York Navy Yard 9 August; decommissioned 9 September; and was sold at public auction to D. T. Trendy 27 September.
