= USS Delaware (1861) =

Gunboat of the United States Navy

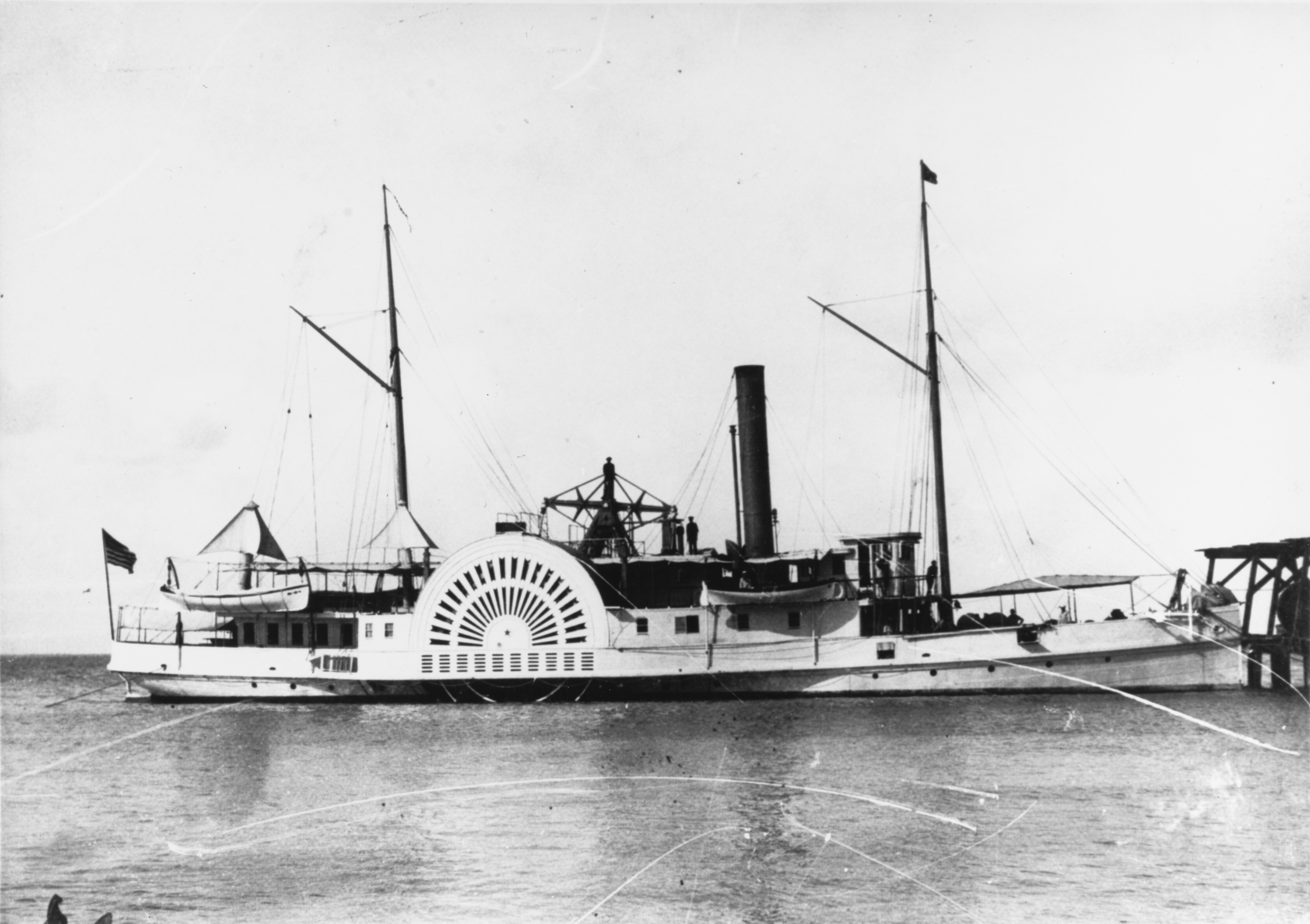
- USRC Louis McLane, formerly USS Delaware.

History

United States
- Name: USS Delaware
- Builder: Harlan & Hollingsworth, Wilmington, Delaware
- Laid down: 1860
- Launched: 1861
- Acquired: 14 October 1861
- Commissioned: 12 December 1861
- Decommissioned: 5 August 1865
- Out of service: 27 December 1902
- Fate: Sold on 12 September 1865 to the U.S. Treasury Department
- Notes: Commissioned as USRC Delaware, 1865; Commissioned as USRC Louis McLane, 1873; Merchant steamer Louis Dolive, 1903

General characteristics
- Type: Gunboat
- Displacement: 350 long tons (360 t)
- Length: 153 ft (47 m)
- Beam: 27 ft 4 in (8.33 m)
- Draft: 6 ft (1.8 m)
- Depth: 8 ft 6 in (2.59 m)
- Propulsion: 1 × walking beam engine,38 in (0.97 m) diameter × 10 ft (3.0 m) stroke; side wheel propelled
- Sail plan: Gaff rig schooner
- Speed: 13 kn (15 mph; 24 km/h)
- Complement: 65 (Navy), 33 (Revenue Cutter Service)
- Armament: 4 × 32-pounder guns, 1 × 12-pounder rifled gun (Navy); 2 guns of unknown caliber (Revenue Cutter Service)

USS Delaware was a steamer acquired by the Union Navy for use during the American Civil War. She had a very active naval career as a gunboat for over three years, and after the war served as a revenue cutter for over 37 years. The steamer was sold to the private sector in 1903, and disappeared from shipping registers in 1919.

== Origins ==
The Delaware—a sidewheel steamer—was the fourth ship to be named Delaware by the Navy. She was built in 1861 at the Harlan & Hollingsworth Iron Shipbuilding Company of Wilmington, Delaware. The steamboat, initially called the Edenton, was ordered in 1860 by the Albemarle Steam Packet Company. This company was made up of 24 businessmen from northeastern North Carolina who wanted to operate a steamboat in the Albemarle Sound area of North Carolina. According to the agreement, the steamboat would be built using "timbers of bar iron, attached to the hull plating via keepers." The Packet Company's president, Edward Wood of Edenton, North Carolina, grew concerned over the deteriorating situation between the North and the South. Wood ultimately stopped payments over fear that the steamboat, now called the Virginia Dare would be detained. (Hayes Collection, SHC) Later the Virginia Dare was purchased by the Union Navy on 14 October 1861, and renamed USS Delaware. Lieutenant S. P. Quackenbush was placed in command.

== Assigned to the North Atlantic blockade ==
Delaware's task—during the course of her patrols—was to sink or capture Confederate ships, and to bombard forts and other military installations. Assigned to the North Atlantic Blockading Squadron, Delaware sailed from Philadelphia, Pennsylvania on 12 December 1861 and stood up the James River on 26 December 1861 on patrol. On 12 January 1862, she sailed for Hatteras Inlet, North Carolina as part of General Burnside's expedition against Confederate forces in the North Carolina sounds. Delaware took part in the capture of Roanoke Island from 7 to 8 February 1862, securing the landing of Union infantry on the island by shelling an awaiting enemy detachment at Ashby's Harbor; and on 10 February 1862 she took part in the attack on Elizabeth City, North Carolina, where she shared in the capture or destruction of five Confederate gunboats and two schooners.

On 19 February 1862, Delaware led a convoy of seven other gunboats up the Chowan River. with the objective of investigating Unionist sympathies in the town of Winton, North Carolina and destroying two railroad bridges over rivers north of the town. It was during this foray that she was nearly ambushed at the town wharf by a force of Confederate soldiers and artillery hiding among the brush on a nearby bluff. Union commander Rush Hawkins, who was in the yardarm of the foremast, spotted the Confederates and warned the helmsman in time to sheer off. Delaware sustained 185 musket shots but was not struck by any Confederate artillery. Once it was out of musket range, the Delaware, then joined by the USS Commodore Perry, opened fire with their artillery upon the bluff, causing the Confederates to disperse. The Union ships withdrew down the river to link up with the rest of the convoy. The federal commanders resolved to return the following morning and directly attack the town. Faced with a full assault, Confederate forces withdrew to prepared positions several miles outside of Winton. The next day Delaware and the other gunboats returned to Winton. Finding it deserted, the town was burned, partly in retaliation for the ambush.

From 13 to 14 March 1862, Delaware participated in the capture of New Bern, North Carolina, and captured four vessels.

== Virginia river operations ==
Delaware arrived in Hampton Roads on 2 June 1862 for service in Virginia waters until 30 October 1862. She had several encounters with enemy batteries and captured a number of small craft which she sent in as prizes. She returned to operations in the rivers and sounds of North Carolina from October 1862 through February 1863, when she sailed with Valley City in tow, arriving at Hampton Roads on 11 February 1863.

Until 5 April 1863, Delaware cruised in the James and York Rivers and Chesapeake Bay, then on the North Carolina coast until 27 November 1863, when she sailed to Baltimore, Maryland, for repairs. On 27 March 1864, she returned to the waters of Virginia, to patrol and perform picket duty, transport men and ordnance stores, and clear the rivers of torpedoes (mines) until the end of the war.

== U.S. Revenue Cutter Service history ==
Delaware arrived at Washington Navy Yard on 27 July 1865 and was decommissioned from U.S. Navy service on 5 August 1865, after serving over three years. On 31 August 1865, she was sold to The Department of the Treasury for $40,000 (less 10-percent) and commissioned USRC Delaware on 12 September 1865. After being fitted out as a revenue cutter in Baltimore, Maryland, she was first assigned to Galveston, Texas in 1865. She was repaired in Baltimore, Maryland in 1867 at a cost of $14,100 and was then reassigned to Mobile, Alabama in 1868.

In 1872 she was ordered to relieve the USRC Wilderness in New Orleans, Louisiana with orders to cruise to Mobile, Alabama "occasionally". She was extensively modified in 1873 for a cost of $11,500 and was renamed Louis McLane in June 1873 honoring the tenth Secretary of the Treasury Louis McLane. She was then ordered to Pensacola, Florida for duty where her cruising area was from Cedar Key, Florida to Biloxi, Mississippi. Louis McLane was assigned to a patrol that enforced neutrality laws in 1897. While operating near Indian Key, Florida on 20 June 1897, she seized the tug Dauntless bound for Cuba that was carrying 175 rifles, 300,000 rounds of ammunition, medical supplies and 27 men on board in violation of U.S. neutrality laws. Secretary of the Treasury Lyman J. Gage singled out Louis McLane in his 1897 report to congress for her enforcement action.

During the Spanish–American War, Louis McLane was stationed at Key West, Florida and commanded by First Lieutenant William E. Reynolds, assigned to the North Atlantic Squadron commanded by Rear Admiral William T. Sampson, USN. Louis McLane patrolled the submarine cable from Key West, Florida to Sanibel Island from 1898 to 1899.

She operated in the Gulf of Mexico for the rest of her career, mostly out of Key West, Florida from 1877 until she was decommissioned on 27 December 1902.

After over 37 years of revenue service, she was sold to J. A. Carney for $4,195 on 23 October 1903. She was re-documented as Louis Dolive on 31 March 1904.

List of officers of USRC Louis McLane in the Spanish American War
- First Lieutenant William E. Reynolds, USRCS, Commanding
- Second Lieutenant Andrew James Henderson, USRCS, Executive Officer
- Second Lieutenant A. R. Hasson, USRCS
- Third Lieutenant George W. Cairns, USRCS
- Second Assistant Engineer Charles A. Wheeler, USRCS

== Notes ==
=== References ===
- "Delaware". Dictionary of American Fighting Ships. Washington, DC: Naval History and Heritage Command, U.S. Navy. Archived from the original on 24 October 2012.
- "Delaware (1865)". Cutter History. U.S. Coast Guard Historian's Office. Archived from the original on 20 May 2017.
- "Record of Movements, Vessels of the United States Coast Guard, 1790–December 31, 1933" (PDF). Historic Documents. U.S. Coast Guard Historian's Office.
- Barrett, John G. (1963). The Civil War in North Carolina. Chapel Hill, North Carolina: University of North Carolina Press.
- Canney, Donald L. (1995). U.S. Coast Guard and Revenue Cutters, 1790–1935. Naval Institute Press, Annapolis, Maryland. ISBN 978-1-55750-101-1.
- Evans, Stephen H. (1949). The United States Coast Guard 1790–1915: A Definitive History. Naval Institute Press, Annapolis, Maryland. No ISBN
- King, Irving H. (1996). The Coast Guard Expands, 1865–1915: New Roles, New Frontiers. Naval Institute Press, Annapolis, Maryland. ISBN 978-1-55750-458-6.
- Lytle, William M.; Holdcamper, Forrest R. (1975). Merchant Steam Vessels of the United States, 1790-1868. Staten Island, New York: The Steamship Historical Society of America.
- Parramore, Thomas C. (1962). "The Burning of Winton In 1862". The North Carolina Historical Review. 39 (1): 18–31. JSTOR 23517317.
- Wood Family Papers in the Hayes Collection, Southern Historical Collection, UNC Chapel Hill, North Carolina.
