= John Williams (Medal of Honor, born 1828) =

- Born: 1828; New Orleans, Louisiana, US
- Died: October 3, 1886 (aged 57–58); Philadelphia Naval Asylum, Philadelphia, Pennsylvania, US
- Burial place: Mount Moriah Cemetery; Philadelphia, Pennsylvania
- Military career
- Allegiance: United States; Union
- Branch: United States Navy; Union Navy
- Rank: Captain of the maintop
- Units: USS Pawnee; USS Ticonderoga
- Conflicts: American Civil War • Battle of Mathias Point
- Awards: Medal of Honor

John Williams (1828 – October 3, 1886) was a Union Navy sailor in the American Civil War who received the U.S. military's highest decoration, the Medal of Honor, for his actions at the Battle of Mathias Point.

== Military service ==
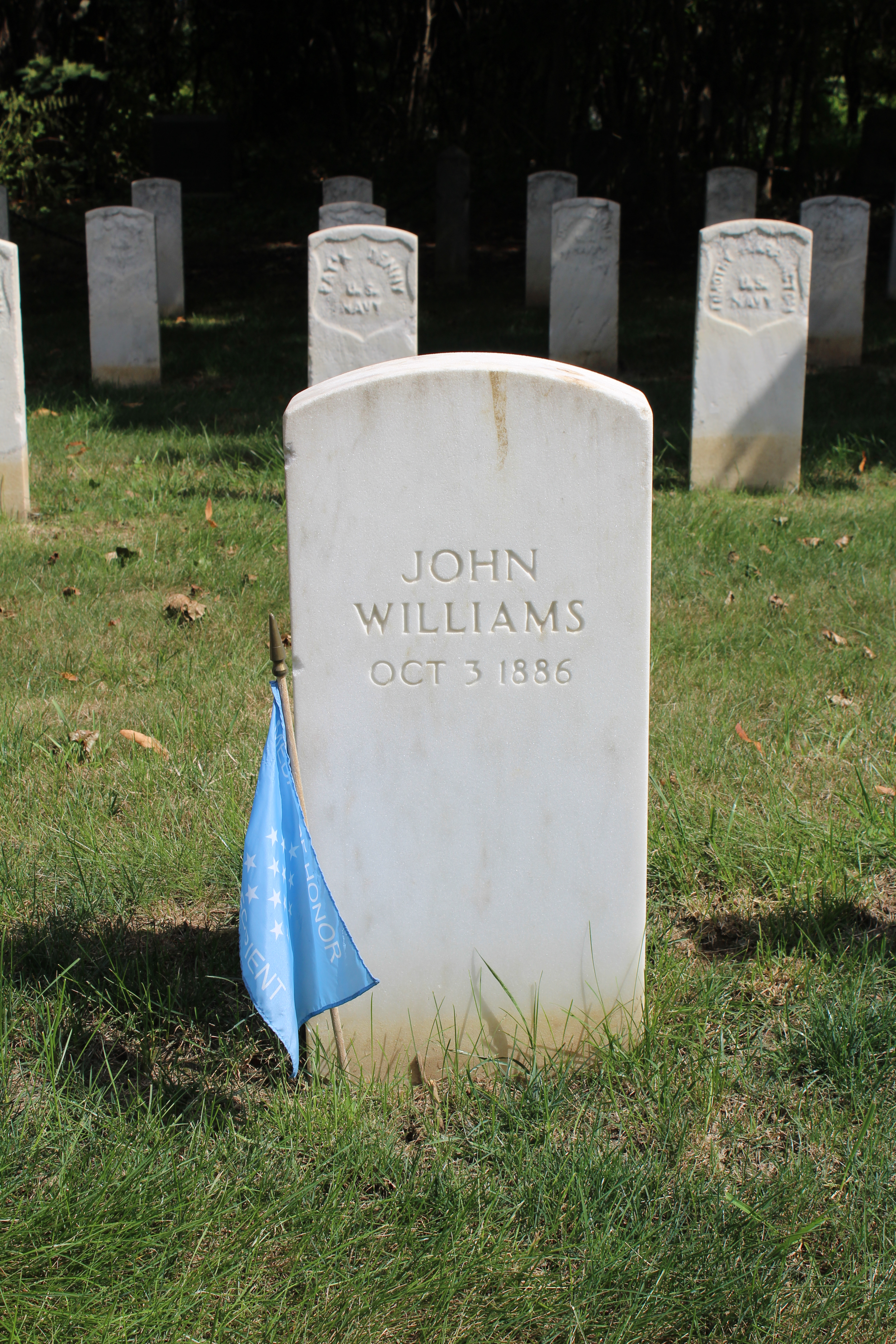
John Williams grave in Mount Moriah Cemetery Naval Plot

Williams was born in 1828 in New Orleans, Louisiana. He served during the Civil War as a captain of the maintop on USS Pawnee.

On June 27, 1861, (Note: Williams' Medal of Honor citation records the date of action as June 26, 1861, however the Battle of Mathias Point actually occurred on June 27, 1861.) Williams was among two small boats of men sent from Pawnee to assist USS Thomas Freeborn in attacking a Confederate force at Mathias Point on the Potomac River in Virginia. After skirmishers and artillery fire from Thomas Freeborn cleared the point, men from the small boats landed and attempted to build fortifications. However, a strong counter-attack by the Confederates forced the landing party to retreat under heavy fire. In charge of one of the boats, Williams ordered his men to stay near shore until all members of the party were aboard, declaring that "every man must die on his thwart sooner than leave a man behind". Williams was shot in the thigh and the boat's flag had its staff shot away, after which he held the flag up until the boat reached Thomas Freeborn. All members of the landing party were successfully evacuated.

For this action, Williams was awarded the Medal of Honor nearly two years later on April 3, 1863. His was the earliest action for which a Navy Medal of Honor was awarded, but he was not the first to receive the medal. Several Navy men who performed later actions were awarded the medal before him, the first being Robert Williams. John Williams later served on USS Ticonderoga as part of the European Squadron and was aboard that ship when he received his physical medal.

Williams is buried at Mount Moriah Cemetery (Naval Plot) Naval 1, Row 4, Grave 14, Yeadon, PA GPS: 39.93654* N, 075.23911*

== Medal of Honor citation ==
Rank and organization: Captain of the Maintop, U.S. Navy. Accredited to: Louisiana. G.O. No.: 11, 3 April 1863.

Williams's official Medal of Honor citation reads:

Serving as captain of the maintop of the U.S.S. Pawnee in the attack upon Mathias Point, 26 June 1861, Williams told his men, while lying off in the boat, that every man must die on his thwart sooner than leave a man behind. Although wounded by a musket ball in the thigh he retained the charge of his boat; and when the staff was shot away, held the stump in his hand, with the flag, until alongside the Freeborn.
