= Battle of Aquia Creek =

Battle of the American Civil War

Coordinates: 38.3893°N 77.3157°W

- Part of the American Civil War
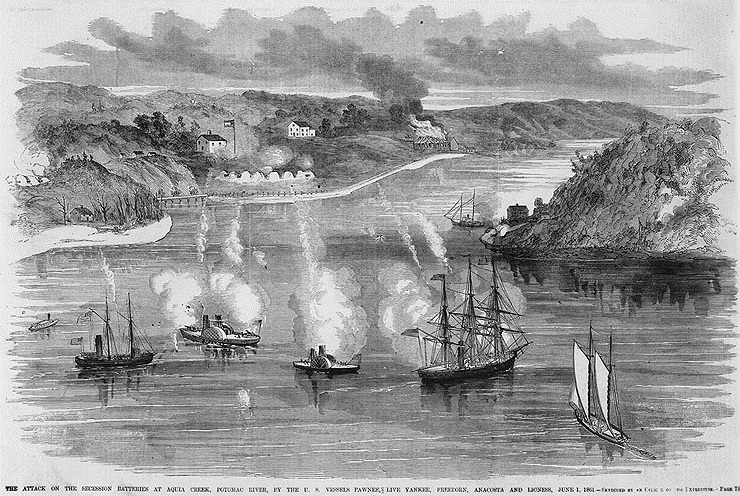
- "The Attack on the Secession Batteries at Aquia Creek, Potomac River, by the U.S. Vessels Pawnee, Live Yankee, Freeborn, Anacostia and Lioness, June 1, 1861."
Date	May 29, 1861 – June 1, 1861
Location	Stafford County, Virginia
Result	Inconclusive

Belligerents
United States	Confederate States

Commanders and leaders
(United States Navy) James H. Ward	(Confederate States of America) Daniel Ruggles

Strength
1 sloop-of-war 3 gunboats	13 artillery pieces 2 shore batteries

Casualties and losses
9 wounded 1 sloop damaged 1 gunboat damaged (Note: Casualty figures for this battle from the National Park Service web site are between 0 and 10 for the US and CS forces combined. One source gives Confederate casualties as 1 wounded. Other sources consulted for this article do not mention casualties for this action. Thus, 0 to 9 casualties are listed for the US force and 1 wounded for the CS force.)	1 wounded

The Battle of Aquia Creek was an exchange of cannon fire between Union Navy gunboats and Confederate shore batteries on the Potomac River at its confluence with Aquia Creek in Stafford County, Virginia. The battle took place from May 29, 1861 to June 1, 1861 during the early days of the American Civil War. The Confederates set up several shore batteries to block Union military and commercial vessels from moving in the Chesapeake Bay and along the lower Potomac River as well as for defensive purposes. The battery at Aquia also was intended to protect the railroad terminal at that location. The Union forces sought to destroy or remove these batteries as part of the effort to blockade Confederate States coastal and Chesapeake Bay ports. The battle was tactically inconclusive. Each side inflicted little damage and no serious casualties on the other. The Union vessels were unable to dislodge the Confederates from their positions or to inflict serious casualties on their garrisons or serious damage to their batteries. The Confederates manning the batteries were unable to inflict serious casualties on the Union sailors or cause serious damage to the Union vessels. Soon after the battle, on Sunday, July 7, 1861, the Confederates first used naval mines, unsuccessfully, off the Aquia Landing batteries. The Confederates ultimately abandoned the batteries on March 9, 1862 as they moved forces to meet the threat created by the Union Army's Peninsula Campaign. The U. S. National Park Service includes this engagement in its list of 384 principal battles of the American Civil War.

== Background ==
Although providing for a referendum on May 23, 1861, the Virginia state convention voted for and effectively accomplished the secession of that state from the Union on April 17, 1861, three days after the surrender of Fort Sumter to Confederate forces and two days after President Abraham Lincoln's call for volunteers to suppress the rebellion. On April 22, 1861, Governor John Letcher of Virginia gave Robert E. Lee command of Virginia State forces with the rank of major general. General Lee dispatched Captain William F. Lynch of the Virginia state navy to examine the defensible points on the Potomac River, and to take measures for the establishment of batteries to prevent Union vessels from navigating that river. On April 24, 1861, Major Thomas H. Williamson of the Virginia Army engineers and Lieut. H. H. Lewis of the Virginia Navy examined the ground at Aquia Creek, (Note: Some early sources spell the name of this location as Acquia Creek.) and selected Split Rock Bluff as the best point for a battery, as the channel there could be commanded from that point by guns of sufficient caliber.

On April 27, 1861, President Lincoln ordered the Union blockade of the Confederacy extended to the coasts of Virginia and North Carolina since those states were already in the process of joining the Confederate States of America. Both the Union and Confederacy then wanted to deny use of the Potomac River to the other side.

On May 8, 1861, Major Williamson began construction on fortifications at the Aquia Creek landing, mainly to protect the terminus of the Fredericksburg and Potomac Railroad, which had its northern terminus at the landing, from seizure by Union Army forces. About May 14, 1861, Captain Lynch and Lieutenant Lewis, along with Commander Robert D. Thorburn and Lieutenant John Wilkinson of the Virginia State Navy, had erected at Aquia a battery of thirteen guns to protect the railroad terminal. The battery also was a threat to close the navigation of the Potomac River in line with the original mission to site guns to command the river. On May 10, 1861, Confederate authorities appointed General Lee to command Confederate troops in Virginia. Brigadier General Daniel Ruggles assumed overall command of the batteries although they remained under the immediate command of Captain Lynch at Aquia.

The Confederate battery at Aquia Landing was first spotted by the USS Mount Vernon on May 14, 1861, but the Mount Vernon made no attack on the position. Since the first battery at Aquia was at the river level and intended mainly to protect the railroad terminal, the Confederates strengthened defenses at Aquia before May 29, 1861 by the addition of a second battery atop the bluffs to the south of the confluence of the Aquia Creek with the Potomac River as originally selected by the scouting party.

== Battle ==
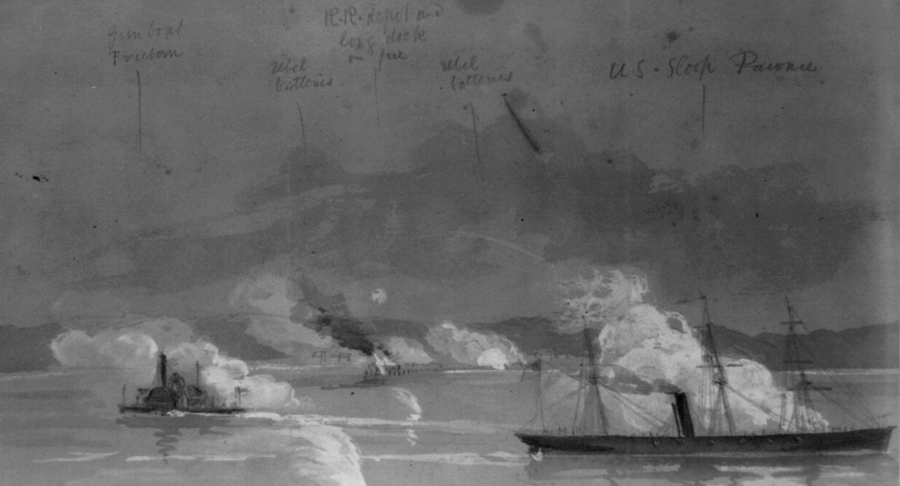
Action between the U.S. vessels Pawnee and Freeborn and the rebel batteries at Acquia [sic] Creek. By Alfred R. Waud of Harper's Weekly.

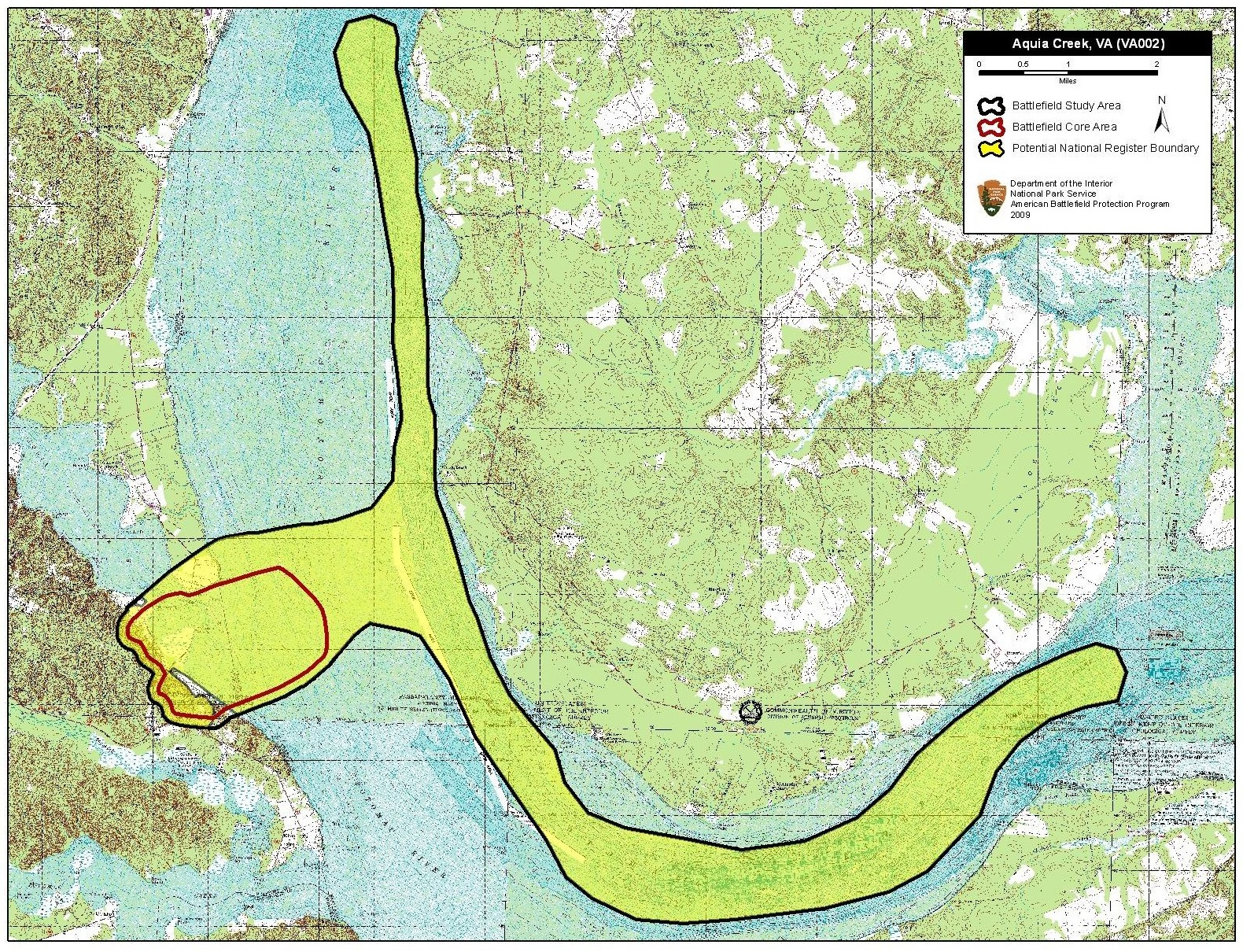
Map of Aquia Creek Battlefield core and study areas by the American Battlefield Protection Program.

On May 29, 1861, a converted 250-ton paddle-wheel steamer mounting three guns, the USS Thomas Freeborn of the Federal Potomac Flotilla under the command of Commander James H. Ward attacked the Confederate batteries at Aquia to little effect. Confederate Captain Lynch reported that the Thomas Freeborn fired 14 shots and only wounded one man in the hand. On the following day, May 30, 1861, the Thomas Freeborn returned with the USS Anacostia, a 200-ton vessel with two guns, and USS Resolute, which was half the size of the Anacostia, and engaged the Confederate batteries for several hours, again with little effect. The largest guns of the squadron were 32-pounders. On June 1, the Thomas Freeborn, Anacostia, Resolute, and the sloop-of-war USS Pawnee bombarded the batteries for almost five hours, firing over 500 rounds. Captain Lynch reported no deaths or injuries from the second and third days of shelling, only the death of a chicken and a horse. Lynch added that his works sustained some damage, houses in the rear were "knocked about" and the railroad was torn up in three or four places. Lynch said that he returned fire sparingly in order to save ammunition and because he could fire only when the ships came in view and range of his embrasures as the big guns could not be turned. (Note: Some newspaper reports and later sources said that the Union vessels had silenced the lower batteries. Scharf says that the batteries were not silenced by Federal gunfire but that Lynch reported firing sparingly as noted in the text above.) Nonetheless, during the fight both the Thomas Freeborn and the Pawnee took minor damage from the batteries and required repairs. No Federal sailors were seriously wounded or killed.

== Aftermath ==
On June 27, 1861, Commander James Harmon Ward became the first United States Navy officer killed during the American Civil War. He was killed while his vessel, the Thomas Freeborn was giving close support to a landing party which was attempting to silence another Confederate battery and to set up a Union battery along the Potomac River at nearby Mathias Point in King George County, Virginia.

Following the battle of Aquia Creek, the Confederates reinforced their defenses in the area by constructing a third battery on the bluff at Aquia and a fourth across the mouth of Aquia Creek at Brent Point. On July 7, Confederates placed mines off Aquia Creek in the Potomac River, marking the first such use in the war. The mines, which were 80-gallon casks supporting a boiler-iron torpedo and enough gunpowder to blow up a ship the size of the Pawnee were spotted by Pawnee sailors as the devices were floating toward them. The mines were later removed from the river by sailors from the Resolute, although one of the mines actually sank into the river.

By the end of October 1861, the Confederate batteries effectively closed the Potomac River for a short time until the Union Navy slowly discovered that the batteries could not hit passing vessels, probably due at least in part to poor quality gunpowder. Despite the Union Navy's conclusion about the lack of threat from the Confederate guns, the Navy forbade civilian traffic on the Potomac River while the batteries were in operation in the event the Confederates might score a lucky hit.

After Major General George B. McClellan took command of the Union Army on November 1, 1861, President Lincoln repeatedly requested that McClellan oust the Confederates from these positions but McClellan did not move. By the time Lincoln ordered McClellan to take action against the batteries in General War Order No. 3 on March 8, 1862 and McClellan moved against them, the Confederates had abandoned the positions. The Confederates abandoned the batteries in early March 1862 when General Joseph E. Johnston recalled their garrisons in preparation to defend Richmond at the start of the Peninsula Campaign. On March 9, 1862, sailors on the Anacostia and USS Yankee noted unusual fires and explosions at the Confederate batteries at Cockpit Point and Shipping Point and Union forces discovered that the Confederate batteries at Aquia and along the Potomac River had been abandoned. The Union Army used the wharves and storage building at Aquia Landing until June 7, 1863 when the army headed north for the Battle of Gettysburg. The Union Army used the facilities again in 1864 during the Overland Campaign.
