= Battle of Mathias Point =

Battle of the American Civil War

- Part of the Eastern theater of the American Civil War
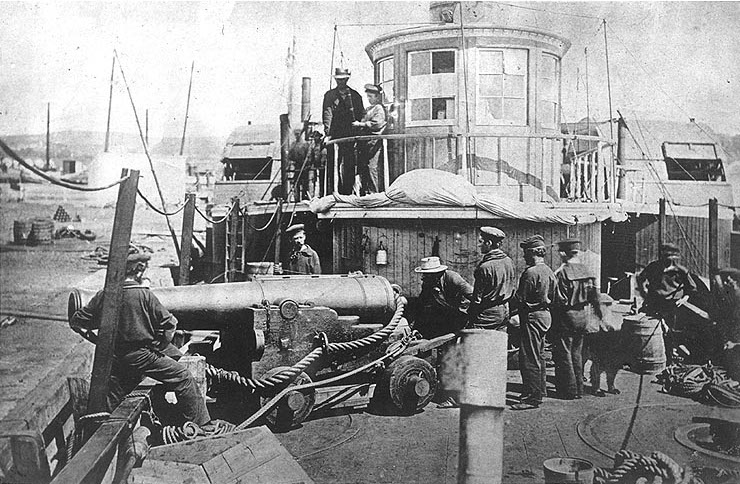
- Sighting a gun aboard USS Thomas Freeborn, 1861
Date	June 27, 1861
Location	Mathias Point, Virginia; King George County, Virginia 38°24′1″N 77°2′31″W
Result	Confederate victory

Belligerents
United States (Union)	(Confederate States of America) CSA (Confederacy)

Commanders and leaders
James H. Ward †; James C. Chaplin; J. P. K. Mygatt	Daniel Ruggles; John M. Brockenbrough; R. M. Mayo

Strength
36–50 gunboat crew	400–500

Casualties and losses
1 killed 4 wounded	None

The Battle of Mathias Point, Virginia (June 27, 1861) was an early naval action of the American Civil War in connection with the Union blockade and the corresponding effort by the Confederates to deny use of the Potomac River to their enemy.

Two Union gunboats tried to prevent the Confederates from installing a battery on the Potomac at Mathias Point in King George County, Virginia. A landing party prepared to install their own battery, but was beaten back before they could unload their guns from the USS Thomas Freeborn. Cannon fire from this vessel kept the Confederates temporarily at bay, and Commander James H. Ward ordered another landing. This was also repulsed, and Ward was killed, becoming the first Union Navy officer to be killed in the war. The Confederates held this position until March 1862.

== Background ==
On April 15, 1861, the day after the small U.S. Army garrison surrendered Fort Sumter in the harbor Charleston, South Carolina to Confederate forces, President Abraham Lincoln called for 75,000 volunteers to reclaim federal property and to suppress the rebellion begun by the seven Deep South slave states which had formed the Confederate States of America. Four Upper South states which also permitted slavery, including Virginia, refused to furnish troops for this purpose and began the process of secession from the Union. On April 17, 1861, a convention in Richmond, Virginia, immediately passed an ordinance providing for Virginia's secession from the Union and authorized the governor to call for volunteers to join the military forces of Virginia to defend the state against Federal military action. The Virginia Secession Convention made the act of secession subject to a vote of the people of the state on May 23, 1861, but the actions of the convention and Virginia political leaders, especially Governor John Letcher, had effectively taken Virginia out of the Union. In view of developments in Virginia, President Lincoln also did not wait for the vote of the people of Virginia on secession to take action as if Virginia already had joined the Confederacy. On April 27, 1861, he extended the blockade of the Southern states that he had declared on April 19, 1861, to include the ports of Virginia and North Carolina.

== Battle ==
In late June 1861, Commander James H. Ward, commander of the Union Potomac Flotilla, learned that the Confederates were installing a battery on a wooded promontory at Mathias Point in King George County, Virginia, which would effectively control traffic on the Potomac River at that point. This not only could prevent men and supplies from moving to and from Washington, D.C. via the Potomac River but would permit communication between Confederate forces and Confederate sympathizers in southern Maryland across the river or even permit a Confederate raid into Maryland. On June 27, 1861, Ward took his flagship, the USS Thomas Freeborn, along with the USS Reliance and a company of sailors or marines under Lieutenant James C. Chaplin to attack the Confederate position, to remove trees from the location so that the Confederates could not hide a battery on the point and instead to put a Union battery at the point.

When the Thomas Freeborn arrived at Mathias Point at about 10:00 a.m. according to some sources and 1:00 p.m. according to others, its crew began to bombard the woods in order to give cover to Lieutenant Chaplin's landing party. Union skirmishers immediately became engaged with Confederate skirmishers and drove them back. The landing party worked at establishing a position for artillery, which they had brought on the boats with them but had not yet brought ashore. Soon, 400 to 500 Confederate soldiers arrived and began to move against and fire upon the small Union force.

Ward initially had accompanied the landing party, but he quickly returned to the Thomas Freeborn in order to direct more firing of the ship's cannon at the location of the Confederate force when they began their counterattack. Lt. Chaplin evacuated his party to their small boats after the initial Confederate approach in force. The cannon fire from the Thomas Freeborn beat back the counterattack. Ward ordered Chaplin to land again and throw up sandbag breastworks when the firing from the Thomas Freeborn temporarily quieted the Confederate force. After coming under fire from the Thomas Freeborn, Colonel Ruggles ordered that his men, under the immediate command of Colonel John M. Brockenbrough, approach through the forest where the Union force was at work in order not to expose the men to fire over an open field. This delayed their further counterattack. Meanwhile, Chaplin and his small force hastily completed the construction of the small breastwork and after trying to hide the exact location of the work with branches, again began to withdraw from the shore about 5:00 p.m. in order to retrieve their artillery. At this time, the Confederates, further supported by four companies of men under the command of Major R. M. Mayo, renewed their counterattack against the Thomas Freeborn and against the landing party, which was moving toward the boats. Heavily outnumbered and under fire, Chaplin and his men were unable to retrieve and unload their guns for the battery and were forced to withdraw completely.

Chaplin and one other member of his party were the last to withdraw. Chaplin personally saved this man who was unable to swim to the small landing boats, which had already shoved off, by carrying him out to the closest boat. In the meantime, after the gunner on the Thomas Freeborn was wounded, Commander Ward was shot through the abdomen by a rifle shot while trying to sight the ship's gun and died after about 45 minutes. His mortal wounding unsettled the crew of the Thomas Freeborn and they fired no more rounds in support of Chaplin's force even though they had not fully withdrawn to the Thomas Freeborn and the Reliance. Ward was the only member of the Union force killed at the battle, although four others were badly wounded. Ward was the first Union Navy officer killed during the Civil War.

== Aftermath ==
The Confederates continued to hold their position and operate the battery on Mathias Point, which they completed placing on the point on the day after the battle. They were not attacked by land forces and did not abandon the location and nearby batteries until Confederate forces withdrew from Manassas and other northern Virginia locations on March 9, 1862, in order to protect Richmond from Union forces which were being deployed for the Peninsula Campaign.

Commander (later Vice Admiral) Stephen Clegg Rowan, captain of the USS Pawnee (1859), temporarily succeeded Commander Ward as the commander of the Potomac Flotilla. He went on to participate in the actions against the Confederate forts at Hatteras Inlet in the fall of 1861 and was succeeded as commander of the Potomac Flotilla by Captain (later Rear Admiral) Thomas Tingey Craven. One Union sailor, Captain of the Maintop John Williams, was awarded the Medal of Honor for his part in the Battle of Mathias Point.

Fort Ward in Alexandria, Virginia, was named in honor of Commander Ward. Fort Ward, which was one of the defenses of Washington, D.C. during the Civil War, was completed in September 1861. The fort has been largely restored and serves as a museum and historic park.
