= List of shipwrecks in February 1846 =

The list of shipwrecks in February 1846 includes ships sunk, foundered, wrecked, grounded, or otherwise lost during February 1846.

== 1 February ==
List of shipwrecks: 1 February 1846
Ship	State	Description
Agnes	United Kingdom	The ship was driven ashore at Panomi Point, Greece. She was refloated and towed in to Salonica for repairs.
Anna Auguste	Bremen	The ship was driven ashore near Mandal, Norway, and was wrecked. She was on a voyage from Bremen to Christiansand, Norway.
Mary	United Kingdom	The barque ran aground on the West Hoyle Sandbank in Liverpool Bay and sank. Her crew were rescued by the Point of Ayr Lifeboat.

== 2 February ==
List of shipwrecks: 2 February 1846
Ship	State	Description
Alice	United Kingdom	The schooner ran aground on the Burbo Bank, in Liverpool Bay. She was on a voyage from Liverpool to Preston, Lancashire.
Ann and Mary	United Kingdom	The smack was damaged by fire at Hubberstone Pill, Pembrokeshire.
Avon	United Kingdom	The ship was driven ashore at Dungeness, Kent. She was on a voyage from Newcastle upon Tyne, Northumberland to Bordeaux, Gironde, France. She was refloated the next day and taken in to The Downs.
Falmouth	United Kingdom	The ship was driven ashore in Studland Bay. She was on a voyage from London to Falmouth, Cornwall. She was refloated and put in to Poole, Dorset.
John Horrocks	United Kingdom	The barque was driven ashore and wrecked at Leasowe, Cheshire. Her crew were rescued. She was on a voyage from Demerara, British Guiana to Liverpool, Lancashire. She was refloated on 24 February and taken in to the River Mersey in a severely damaged condition.
Mersey	United Kingdom	The ship ran aground on the Burbo Bank, in Liverpool Bay. She was on a voyage from Limerick to Lytham St. Annes, Lancashire. She was refloated and put in to Liverpool.
Orion	United Kingdom	The ship was driven ashore at Dungeness, Kent. She was on a voyage from Newcastle upon Tyne, Northumberland to Bordeaux, Gironde, France. She was refloated the next day and taken in to The Downs.
Penguin	United Kingdom	The ship ran aground on the Newcombe Sand, in the North Sea off the coast of Norfolk. She was refloated and put in to Dover, Kent in a leaky condition.

== 3 February ==
List of shipwrecks: 3 February 1846
Ship	State	Description
Berwick	United Kingdom	The ship departed from Portsmouth, Hampshire for Mauritius and Calcutta, India. No further trace, presumed foundered with the loss of all hands.
George	United Kingdom	The ship departed from Middlesbrough, Yorkshire for Torquay, Devon. No further trace, presumed foundered with the loss of all hands.
Jessie	United Kingdom	The ship ran aground on the Quarry Rocks, in the Orkney Islands. She was on a voyage from Wick, Caithness to Londonderry. She was refloated and beached at Stromness.

== 4 February ==
List of shipwrecks: 4 February 1846
Ship	State	Description
Anna and Louise	Hamburg	The ship was in collision with a barque and sank off the Owers Sandbank. Her crew were rescued by a fishing boat from Brighton, Sussex. She was on a voyage from Hamburg to La Guaira, Venezuela. The barque also sank.
Hamlet	United States	The ship was abandoned at sea. She was on a voyage from Rio de Janeiro, Brazil to New Orleans, Louisiana.
Vesta	United Kingdom	The ship was wrecked at Lisbon, Portugal with the loss of six of her crew. She was on a voyage from Demerara to the Clyde.
Victoria	United Kingdom	The ship ran aground at the mouth of the Mississippi River. She was on a voyage from New Orleans to Liverpool, Lancashire.

== 5 February ==
List of shipwrecks: 5 February 1846
Ship	State	Description
Bdelliuim, or Falcon, or Pallion	United Kingdom	The ship was in collision with the collier British Queen and foundered in the North Sea off Orfordness Suffolk. Her crew were rescued.
Brothers	United Kingdom	The ship was driven ashore on the Northam Burrows, Devon. She was on a voyage from Bideford, Devon to Bristol, Gloucestershire. She was refloated and taken in to Bideford.
Druid	United Kingdom	The ship was driven ashore in Allonby Bay. Her crew were rescued. She was on a voyage from Annan, Dumfriesshire to Maryport, Cumberland. She was refloated on 12 February and taken in to Maryport.
Eos	Danzig	The ship capsized at Swinemünde, Prussia with the loss of four of her six crew. She was on a voyage from London, United Kingdom to Danzig.
Marmora	United States	The screw steamer was wrecked on the Spalmidores, in the Gulf of Scio. She was on a voyage from Smyrna, Ottoman Empire to Beyrout, Ottoman Syria
North Pole	United Kingdom	The ship was driven ashore at Aden. She was on a voyage from Newport, Monmouthshire to Aden. She was refloated the next day.
Venus	United Kingdom	The ship was driven ashore and severely damaged on the Northam Barrows. Her crew were rescued. She was on a voyage from Cork to Cardiff, Glamorgan. Venus was refloated on 8 February.

== 6 February ==
List of shipwrecks: 6 February 1846
Ship	State	Description
Rokeby	United Kingdom	The ship ran aground on the Barber Sand, in the North Sea off the coast of Norfolk. She was on a voyage from Sunderland, County Durham, to London. She was refloated and resumed her voyage.

== 7 February ==
List of shipwrecks: 7 February 1846
Ship	State	Description
Heywood	United Kingdom	The ship was driven ashore and wrecked at Llanddwyn Point, Caernarvonshire. Her crew were rescued. She was on a voyage from Africa to Liverpool, Lancashire. She was refloated in mid-February.
Josephine	United Kingdom	The ship was wrecked near Boulogne, Pas-de-Calais, France with the loss of three of her five crew. She was on a voyage from Limekilns, Fife to Hull, Yorkshire. She was refloated on 1 March and taken in to Boulogne.

== 8 February ==
List of shipwrecks: 8 February 1846
Ship	State	Description
Isis	Prussia	The ship was driven ashore at Memel. She was on a voyage from Memem to Hull, Yorkshire, United Kingdom. She was refloated.

== 9 February ==
List of shipwrecks: 9 February 1846
Ship	State	Description
Bencoolen	United Kingdom	The barque was wrecked on Taylor's Bank, in Liverpool Bay with the loss of thirteen of the 21 people on board. She was on a voyage from Callao, Peru to Liverpool, Lancashire.
City of Exeter	United Kingdom	The ship ran aground and was wrecked at Paignton, Devon. She was on a voyage from Hull, Yorkshire to Paignton.
Guide	(United Kingdom of Great Britain and Ireland) British North America	The brig was driven ashore in Blind Bay, New Zealand.
Owner's Delight	United Kingdom	The Yorkshire billyboy was wrecked on the Cant Knoll, in the North Sea off the coast of Kent. Her crew were rescued. She was on a voyage from Harwich, Essex to Faversham, Kent. She was refloated on 12 February and taken in to Whitstable, Kent.
Psyche	United Kingdom	The ship was wrecked on the Shipwash Sand, in the North Sea off the coast of Essex. Her crew were rescued. She was on a voyage from Boston, Lincolnshire to London.

== 10 February ==
List of shipwrecks: February 1846
Ship	State	Description
Alert	United Kingdom	The ship was driven ashore at Poole, Dorset. She was refloated the next day.
Ann	United Kingdom	The flat was wrecked on the Burbo Bank, in Liverpool Bay. Her crew were rescued.
Dasher	United Kingdom	The ship ran aground on the Burbo Bank. She was refloated and put back to Liverpool, Lancashire.
Johanna Gesina	Netherlands	The ship was wrecked at Warffum, Groningen. She was on a voyage from Stettin to Delfzijl, South Holland.
Maria Orr	(United Kingdom of Great Britain and Ireland) New South Wales	The whaler was wrecked on the Black Rock, in Recherche Bay with the loss of a crew member.
New Invention	(United Kingdom of Great Britain and Ireland) New South Wales	The ship was driven ashore on Wentworth's Promontory.
Oberon	United Kingdom	The ship foundered in the Atlantic Ocean. Her crew were rescued. She was on a voyage from King's Lynn, Norfolk to Saint Andrews, New Brunswick, British North America.

== 11 February ==
List of shipwrecks: 11 February 1846
Ship	State	Description
Eendraght	Netherlands	The ship was driven ashore on "Scheerman Koog". She was on a voyage from Tönning, Duchy of Holstein to Amsterdam, North Holland.
Engelina	Denmark	The ship was driven ashore on Juist, Duchy of Holstein. She was on a voyage from Køge to Antwerp, Belgium.
Freundschaft	Denmark	The galiot was beached on Heligoland. She was on a voyage from Stubbekøbing to London, United Kingdom.
Union	United Kingdom	The ship ran aground off Dunkerque, Nord and was abandoned by her crew. She later floated off and came ashore.

== 12 February ==
List of shipwrecks: 12 February 1846
Ship	State	Description
Susan	United Kingdom	The ship ran aground in the River Shannon. She was on a voyage from Limerick to Liverpool, Lancashire. She was refloated and put back to Limerick.

== 13 February ==
List of shipwrecks: 13 February 1846
Ship	State	Description
Empress	United Kingdom	The ship ran aground at South Shields, County Durham. She was on a voyage from South Shields to Alexandria, Egypt. She was refloated and resumed her voyage.
Franz	Prussia	The ship ran aground on the Kniepsand, in the North Sea off the coast of the Duchy of Holstein. Her crew were rescued. She was on a voyage from Memel to Stockton-on-Tees, County Durham, United Kingdom.
Jeune Albert	France	The brig sank at Charleston, South Carolina, United States.
John Edward	(United Kingdom of Great Britain and Ireland) British North America	The ship was driven ashore by ice at Shelburne, Nova Scotia. She was on a voyage from Halifax, Nova Scotia to Boston, Massachusetts, United States.
Joseph	United Kingdom	The ship collided with Matchless (United Kingdom) and sank in the English Channel off Beachy Head, Sussex. Her crew were rescued.
Nymph	United Kingdom	The ship ran aground on the Shoebury Knock Sand, in the Thames Estuary of the coast of Essex. She was on a voyage from Pwllheli, Caernarfonshire to London. She was refloated and resumed her voyage.
Sampo	United Kingdom	The ship ran aground and was severely damaged at Cardiff, Glamorgan. She was on a voyage from Cardiff to Malta.
Trent	United Kingdom	The ship ran aground at South Shields. she was on a voyage from South Shields to London. She was refloated and put back to South Shields in a leaky condition.

== 14 February ==
List of shipwrecks: 14 February 1846
Ship	State	Description
Marie Jacoba	Prussia	The ship was driven ashore. She was on a voyage from Pillau to London, United Kingdom. She was refloated and put in to Marstrand, Sweden.

== 15 February ==
List of shipwrecks: 15 February 1846
Ship	State	Description
Alabama	United States	Minturn Storm: The schooner was driven ashore near Manasquan Inlet at Seaside Heights, New Jersey. According to different sources, either her crew was rescued or there were no survivors.
Avalanche	United States	Minturn Storm: The ship was driven ashore on Ellis Island in New York Harbor off New York City.
Commerce	United Kingdom	The ship ran aground on the Burbo Bank, in Liverpool Bay. She was on a voyage from Liverpool, Lancashire to Dublin. She was refloated and resumed her voyage.
John Minturn	United States	John Minturn Minturn Storm: The 398-ton full-rigged ship or bark (sources disagree) was wrecked off Mantoloking, New Jersey. Sources disagree on casualties, claiming that more than 60 lives were lost, that there were approximately 10 survivors and 40 dead, and that there were about 30 deaths. Her wreck sank in 20 feet (6 m) of water. Her loss led to the formation in 1878 of the United States Life-Saving Service, one of the ancestor organizations of the United States Coast Guard.
Lotty	Sweden	Minturn Storm: The barque was driven ashore on the coast of New Jersey 23 miles (37 km) south of Sandy Hook with the loss of two of her crew.
Mary Ellen	Sweden	Minturn Storm: The pilot boat was lost with all hands off Sandy Hook, New Jersey.
New Jersey	United States	Minturn Storm: The barque was driven ashore and wrecked without loss of life the coast of New Jersey 23 miles (37 km) south of Sandy Hook.
Orleans	United States	Minturn Storm: The ship was driven ashore on "Swan Beach" — a misspelling of "Squam Beach" or "Squan Beach," terms used at the time for the coast of New Jersey near Manasquan and sometimes for the entire coast of New Jersey between Sea Girt and Barnegat Inlet — on the coast of New Jersey.
Pioneer	United States	Minturn Storm: According to different sources, the schooner either foundered off the coast of New Jersey with the loss of all hands or was wrecked without loss of life on the coast of New Jersey 11 miles (18 km) south of Sandy Hook. She was on a voyage from Brandywine, Maryland, to New Haven, Connecticut.
Register	United States	Minturn Storm: The schooner was driven ashore on the coast of New Jersey 12 miles (19 km) south of Sandy Hook with the loss of one life.
Robert Bruce	United Kingdom	Minturn Storm: The ship was driven ashore on Bedloe's Island in New York Harbor off New York City. She was on a voyage from Belize City, British Honduras, to New York City.
Volant	United States	Minturn Storm: The ship was driven ashore on Staten Island, New York.

== 16 February ==
List of shipwrecks: 16 February 1846
Ship	State	Description
Thomas and Mary	United Kingdom	The ship ran aground on the Knowl, in the North Sea. She was refloated.

== 17 February ==
List of shipwrecks: 17 February 1846
Ship	State	Description
Acquilla	(United Kingdom of Great Britain and Ireland) Saint Helena	The schooner was driven ashore and wrecked on Saint Helena.
Cornelia, and Descobrador	(United Kingdom of Great Britain and Ireland) Saint Helena; Spain	The brig Descobrador was driven into the schooner Cornelia and both vessels were then driven ashore on Saint Helena. Cornelia was wrecked.
Euphrasia	(United Kingdom of Great Britain and Ireland) Saint Helena	The schooner was driven ashore and wrecked on Saint Helena.
Fourth of March	(United Kingdom of Great Britain and Ireland) Saint Helena	The ship was driven ashore and wrecked on Saint Helena.
Julia	(United Kingdom of Great Britain and Ireland) Saint Helena	The ship was driven ashore and wrecked on Saint Helena.
Parmelia	(United Kingdom) British North America	The ship was abandoned in the Atlantic Ocean with the loss of a crew member or two. Survivors were rescued by Clansman (United Kingdom). Parmelia was on a voyage from Savannah, Georgia to Boston, Massachusetts, United States.
Remdina	Bremen	The ship was driven ashore on Eierland, North Holland, Netherlands with the loss of all but two of her crew. She was on a voyage from Hull, Yorkshire, United Kingdom to Bremen.
Rocket	(United Kingdom of Great Britain and Ireland) Saint Helena	The coal hulk was driven ashore and wrecked on Saint Helena.
Silurian	United Kingdom	The ship ran aground on the Newcombe Sand, in the North Sea off the coast of Suffolk. She was on a voyage from Newport, Monmouthshire to Hull, Yorkshire. She was refloated and taken in to Lowestoft, Suffolk.
Smile	United Kingdom	The ship was driven ashore and wrecked on the coast of Patagonia, Argentina north of Quintano Island. Her crew were rescued.

== 18 February ==
List of shipwrecks: 18 February 1846
Ship	State	Description
Echo	Hamburg	The brig was driven ashore in the Elbe downstream of Blankenese. She was refloated.
Favourite	United Kingdom	The ship ran aground on the West Knock, in the Thames Estuary. She was on a voyage from Galway to London. She was refloated.
Jantina	Netherlands	The ship ran aground off Rotterdam, South Holland. Her crew were rescued She was on a voyage from Tromsø, Norway to Amsterdam, North Holland.

== 19 February ==
List of shipwrecks: 19 February 1846
Ship	State	Description
Dart	United Kingdom	The ship ran aground on the Haisborough Sands, in the North Sea off the coast of Norfolk and was abandoned by her crew. she was on a voyage from Shoreham-by-Sea, Sussex to Hartlepool, County Durham.
Lady East	United Kingdom	The ship departed from Singapore for Liverpool, Lancashire. No further trace, presumed foundered with the loss of all hands.

== 20 February ==
List of shipwrecks: 21 February 1846
Ship	State	Description
Seaman	United Kingdom	The schooner was driven ashore near Kilcleif Castle, County Down. She was on a voyage from Liverpool, Lancashire to Londonderry.

== 21 February ==
List of shipwrecks: 21 February 1846
Ship	State	Description
Carpenter	(United Kingdom of Great Britain and Ireland) Isle of Man	The sloop was wrecked on Sanda Island. Her crew were rescued. She was on a voyage from Port St. Mary to the Isle of Mull.
Douro	United Kingdom	The ship was wrecked on Kerney Point, County Down. She was on a voyage from Cádiz, Spain to Liverpool, Lancashire and the Clyde.
Industry	United Kingdom	The ship ran aground and was wrecked at Port Talbot, Glamorgan.
Larch	United Kingdom	The ship was driven ashore and wrecked at "Poolwash", Isle of Man. Her crew were rescued. She was on a voyage from Dublin to Whitehaven, Cumberland.
Maria	(United Kingdom of Great Britain and Ireland) British North America	The ship was wrecked on a reef off Nevis. She was on a voyage from Trinidad to Nevis.
Northumbrian Maid	United Kingdom	The ship struck rocks and was wrecked at Cloghy, County Down. She was on a voyage from Liverpool to Londonderry.

== 22 February ==
List of shipwrecks: 22 February 1846
Ship	State	Description
Banbury	United Kingdom	The ship was driven ashore and wrecked at Holyhead, Anglesey. Her crew were rescued. She was on a voyage from Liverpool, Lancashire to Cork.
Cadiz	United Kingdom	The ship ran aground and was damaged at Campbeltown, Argyllshire. She was on a voyage from Ballina, County Mayo to Liverpool. She was refloated and taken in to Campbeltown.
Gloria	Stettin	The brig was driven ashore in Dundrum Bay. She was on a voyage from Liverpool to Stettin.
Industry	United Kingdom	The ship was driven ashore and wrecked at Ardmore, Islay. She was on a voyage from Liverpool to Methil, Fife and St. David's.
Iride	United Kingdom	The ship was wrecked at Carnsore Point, County Wexford. Her crew were rescued. She was on a voyage from Messina, Sicily to Liverpool.
Jacob Pennell	United States	The ship was driven ashore at Carnsore Point. She was on a voyage from Mobile, Alabama to Liverpool.
Tam O'Shanter	(United Kingdom of Great Britain and Ireland) New South Wales	The cutter capsized and sank at the mouth of the Manning River with the loss of her captain. Two crew survived. She was on a voyage from Sydney to the Manning River.

== 23 February ==
List of shipwrecks: 23 February 1846
Ship	State	Description
Canton	Flag unknown	The ship sprang a leak, capsized and was severely damaged at port-au-Prince, Haiti. She was condemned.
Industry	United Kingdom	The ship was driven ashore and wrecked at Port Talbot, Glamorgan.
New Fame	Malta	The ship sank at Portsmouth, Hampshire, United Kingdom. She was on a voyage from Newcastle upon Tyne, Northumberland to Malta.

== 24 February ==
List of shipwrecks: 24 February 1846
Ship	State	Description
Active	Danzig	The ship ran aground north of Skagen, Denmark. Her crew were rescued. She was on a voyage from Liverpool, Lancashire, United Kingdom to Danzig.
Blackaller	United Kingdom	The ship was driven ashore and wrecked at Port Elizabeth, Cape Colony. Her crew were rescued.
Chaffey	United Kingdom	The brig was driven ashore in Doctor's Cove, Deer Island, New Brunswick, British North America. She was refloated.
Earl Kelly	United Kingdom	The barque was driven ashore at Rattray Head, Aberdeenshire. She was on a voyage from Pillau, Prussia to Leith, Lothian.
Friends	United Kingdom	The ship was damaged by fire at Antwerp, Belgium.
Great Liverpool	United Kingdom	During a voyage from Alexandria, Egypt, to Southampton, Hampshire, England, the 1,150-ton, 223-foot (68.0 m) paddle steamer ran aground and was wrecked on the Guros Shoal, off Cape Finisterre, Spain. According to different sources, either the total number of people aboard was 150 or the number of passengers alone was 146, and either two or three people lost their lives. She broke up on 27 February. Her captain subsequently committed suicide.
Jim Crow	United Kingdom	The schooner was driven ashore and wrecked at Port Elizabeth. Her crew were rescued.
Josephine	United Kingdom	The sloop was wrecked near Boulogne-sur-Mer, Pas-de-Calais, France with the loss of two of her crew.
Laura and George	(United Kingdom of Great Britain and Ireland) British North America	The ship was wrecked on the Sisters Rocks, off Halifax, Nova Scotia. She was on a voyage from Puerto Rico to Halifax.
Spark	United Kingdom	The schooner was wrecked on Puffin Island, Anglesey. Her crew were rescued. She was towed in to Bangor, Caernarfonshire on 3 March.
Susan	United Kingdom	The barque was driven ashore and wrecked at Port Elizabeth with the loss of a crew member.
Thomas	United Kingdom	The smack was wrecked on the Long Rock, off the coast of County Antrim. She was on a voyage from Port Nessock, Wigtownshire to Skerries, County Dublin.
Valiant	United Kingdom	The ship was driven ashore at Moelfre, Anglesey. She was on a voyage from London to Glasson Dock, Lancashire. She was refloated on 27 February.

== 25 February ==
List of shipwrecks: 25 February 1846
Ship	State	Description
Doctor	United Kingdom	The ship ran aground on the Kish Bank, in the Irish Sea. She was on a voyage from Liverpool, Lancashire to Gibraltar. She was refloated and put in to Kingstown, County Dublin in a leaky condition.
Earl of Kellie	United Kingdom	The ship was driven ashore at Rattray Head, Aberdeenshire. She was on a voyage from Pillau, Prussia to Leith, Lothian.
Mercurius	Denmark	The ship was wrecked in "Haybe Bay". Her crew were rescued. She was on a voyage from a French port to Fredrikstad.
Rockingham	United States	The ship was abandoned in the Atlantic Ocean. Her crew were rescued by Queen (United Kingdom). Rockingham was on a voyage from New York to Oran, Algeria.
Victory	United Kingdom	The steamship ran aground at Pill, Somerset. She was on a voyage from Cork to Bristol, Gloucestershire. She was refloated the next day and taken in to Bristol.

== 26 February ==
List of shipwrecks: 26 February 1846
Ship	State	Description
Amphitrite	Netherlands	The ship ran aground on the Shingles. She was on a voyage from Rotterdam, South Holland to "Nickene". She was refloated and put in to Ramsgate, Kent, United Kingdom.
Angelina	Netherlands	The ship ran aground off Fanø, Denmark. She was on a voyage from Roskilde, Denmark to Rotterdam, South Holland.
Ida	United Kingdom	The barque capsized in the Atlantic Ocean (44°00′N 52°30′W) with the loss of 45 of the 56 people on board. Survivors were rescued by an American schooner. She was on a voyage from Portsmouth, Hampshire to Saint John, New Brunswick, British North America.
Little Pet	United Kingdom	The ship was in collision with Mahaica (United Kingdom) and sank in the Irish Sea off Ballycotton, County Antrim. Her crew were rescued. She was on a voyage from Cork to Swansea, Glamorgan.
Maria	Hamburg	The ship was wrecked off Ameland, Friesland, Netherlands. Her crew were rescued. She was on a voyage from Hamburg to Antwerp, Belgium.
Protea	Belgium	The ship ran aground on the Goodwin Sands, Kent. She was on a voyage from Antwerp to Cette, Hérault, France. She was refloated and put in to Ramsgate in a leaky condition.

== 27 February ==
List of shipwrecks: 27 February 1846
Ship	State	Description
Arab	United Kingdom	The ship was driven ashore in Millbay. She was refloated and taken in to Plymouth, Devon.
Britannia	United Kingdom	The ship was driven ashore and severely damaged near Baltimore, County Cork. She was on a voyage from Glasgow, Renfrewshire to Malta.
Emma	(United Kingdom of Great Britain and Ireland) New South Wales	The ship was wrecked in the Namoa Strait with the loss of five of her crew.

== 28 February ==
List of shipwrecks: 28 February 1846
Ship	State	Description
Balius	United Kingdom	The schooner was wrecked on the south west coast of Faial Island, Azores with the loss of three of the eleven people on board. She was on a voyage from Jamaica to Liverpool, Lancashire.
Euphemie	France	The brig was driven ashore and wrecked on the South Capochos Rocks, off Lisbon, Portugal with the loss of five of the eight people on board.
Helen Anderson	United Kingdom	The ship was wrecked at Siculiana, Sicily. She was on a voyage from Kingston upon Hull, Yorkshire to Constantinople, Ottoman Empire.
Hoddam Castle	United Kingdom	The sloop was wrecked at the Southerness Lighthouse, Kirkcudbrightshire.
John and Margaret	United Kingdom	The ship was driven ashore in Whitelink Bay. She was on a voyage from Newcastle upon Tyne, Northumberland to Inverness. She was refloated and taken in to Fraserburgh, Aberdeenshire.
Prince of Wales	United Kingdom	The ship was driven ashore on the Isle of Noss, Shetland Islands. She was refloated on 7 March and taken in to Lerwick.
Princesse Marie	France	The ship ran aground at Tampico, Mexico. She was on a voyage from Bordeaux, Gironde to Tampico. She was consequently condemned.

== Unknown date ==
List of shipwrecks: Unknown date in February 1846
Ship	State	Description
Adair	United Kingdom	The ship was driven ashore and wrecked at "Keruspoint", County Antrim.
Albania	Flag unknown	The brig was wrecked at Navarino, Greece before 8 February with the loss of all but three of those on board. She was on a voyage from Zea, Greece to Trieste.
Allerton	United Kingdom	The ship was driven ashore in the Mozambique Channel. She was on a voyage from Bombay, India to Liverpool, Lancashire. She was refloated and put in to Algoa Bay, where she arrived on 28 February.
Ann	United Kingdom	The ship was wrecked on the French coast. She was on a voyage from Portsmouth, Hampshire to Blyth, Northumberland.
Bella Clara	Flag unknown	African Slave Trade: The brigantine was captured in the Atlantic Ocean by HMS Pantaloon (Royal Navy). A prize crew was placed on board with instructions to sail to Pernambuco, Brazil, but she subsequently sprang a leak and foundered. Her crew were rescued.
Christian	United Kingdom	The ship was driven ashore at Maryport, Cumberland. She was on a voyage from Belfast, County Antrim to Maryport. She was refloated on 3 February and taken in to Maryport.
Corneille	France	The ship was lost near Ouidah, Kingdom of Dahomey before 25 February. She was on a voyage from Bahia, Brazil to an African port.
Dee	United Kingdom	The ship was lost before 20 February. She was on a voyage from British Honduras to Liverpool.
Dorothy	United Kingdom	The brig was wrecked near Hayle, Cornwall before 4 February.
Eliza Ann	(United Kingdom of Great Britain and Ireland) New South Wales	The schooner was wrecked between the Seal Rocks and Port Macquarie before 10 February with the loss of three of her four crew.
Elizabeth	United Kingdom	The brig was abandoned off Cape Rosier, Maine, United States before 7 February.
Emelie Louise	Prussia	The ship ran aground on the Paternoster Rocks. She was on a voyage from Pillau to Newcastle upon Tyne, Northumberland, United Kingdom. She was refloated and put in to Marstrand, Sweden for repairs. Emelie Louise sailed of Newcastle upon Tyne on 8 February.
Favourite	United Kingdom	The ship was driven ashore at Maryport, Cumberland. She was refloated on 12 February and taken in to Maryport.
George	United Kingdom	The trow was abandoned in the Bristol Channel before 8 February.
Glendower	United Kingdom	The ship was driven ashore at Portmadoc, Caernarfonshire before 17 February. She was on a voyage from Liverpool, Lancashire to Portmadoc. She was refloated and towed back to Liverpool.
Horsford	United Kingdom	The ship was driven ashore in Larne Lough. She was on a voyage from Liverpool to Trinidad. She was refloated on 11 February.
Jacob Pennell	United Kingdom	The ship was wrecked near Carnsore Point, County Wexford.
Jane Dixon	United Kingdom	The ship was wrecked on the coast of Patagonia, Argentina before 28 February. Her crew were rescued.
John	(United Kingdom of Great Britain and Ireland) New South Wales	The cutter was wrecked at Mount Eliza before 18 February.
John Bannister	United Kingdom	The ship foundered in the North Sea before 12 February.
Levrette	French Navy	The Iris-class schooner was wrecked at Cabo de la Vela, Republic of New Granada.
Margaret and Eliza	United Kingdom	The ship was driven ashore on the Cairnbulg Brigs. She was on a voyage from Mahón, Spain to Peterhead, Aberdeenshire. SHe was refloated and completed her voyage, arriving at Peterhead on 25 February.
Morning Star	United Kingdom	The flat ran aground on Yed's Bank, in the Irish Sea. She was on a voyage from Wicklow to Liverpool. She was refloated and put in to Southport, Lancashire in a leaky condition.
Montague	France	The ship was wrecked on the French coast. She was on a voyage from Newcastle upon Tyne, Northumberland to Honfleur, Calvados.
Normanton	United Kingdom	The brig sprang a leak and foundered in the Atlantic Ocean. Her crew were rescued by the brig Constantino ( Kingdom of Sardinia). Normanton was on a voyage from Newcastle upon Tyne to Marseille, Bouches-du-Rhône, France.
Perle	Flag unknown	The ship was driven ashore. She was on a voyage from "Karzebecksminde" to Leith, Lothian, United Kingdom. She was refloated and put in to Brunsbüttel, Duchy of Holstein, where she arrived on 9 February.
Peru	United Kingdom	The ship was wrecked at Saint-Valery-sur-Somme, France with the loss of a crew member. She was on a voyage from Marseille to Plymouth, Devon and London.
Ralph	United States	The ship foundered in the Atlantic Ocean off Bermuda before 23 February. She was on a voyage from New York to Gibraltar.
Sally	United Kingdom	The ship was driven ashore at Maryport. She was refloated on 12 February and taken in to Maryport.
Success	(United Kingdom of Great Britain and Ireland) New South Wales	The whaler, schooner was wrecked in the Foreaux Straits, New Zealand before 23 February.
Sunshine	United Kingdom	The ship was driven ashore near Southport, Lancashire on or before 2 February.
Traveller	United Kingdom	The ship was wrecked on the French coast. She was on a voyage from Liverpool, Lancashire to Ipswich, Suffolk.
Washington	Kingdom of Sardinia	The brig was scuttled by her crew, who mutinied, murdered her captain, his son and the passengers before 12 February. She was on a voyage from Callao, Peru to Liverpool.
Widgeon	United Kingdom	The ship was wrecked on the French coast. She was on a voyage from South Shields, County Durham to Genoa, Kingdom of Sardinia.
