= USS Thomas Freeborn =

Gunboat of the United States Navy

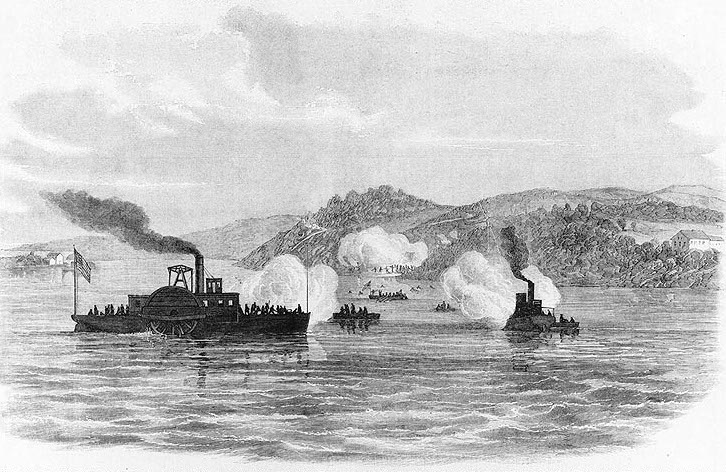
- USS Thomas Freeborn (left) in the engagement at Mathias Point, 27 June 1861

History

United States
- Name: USS Thomas Freeborn
- Builder: Lawrence & Foulks (Williamsburg, NY)
- Launched: 17 November 1860
- In service: April 1861
- Out of service: 17 June 1865
- Home port: Washington, D.C.
- Fate: Sold, 20 July 1865

General characteristics
- Displacement: 269 tons
- Length: 143 ft 4 in (43.69 m)
- Beam: 25 ft 6 in (7.77 m)
- Draught: not known
- Propulsion: steam engine; side wheel-propelled
- Speed: not known
- Complement: not known
- Armament: two 32-pounder guns

USS Thomas Freeborn was a steam tug acquired by the Union Navy during the American Civil War. She was used by the Navy as a gunboat to patrol navigable waterways of the Confederacy to prevent the South from trading with other countries.

== Construction ==
Thomas Freeborn was a sidewheel steamer built in 1860 at Brooklyn, New York. She was launched on November 17, 1860, and was named after Captain Thomas Freeborn, who lost his life in the discharge of his duty on board the ship John Minturn on December 15, 1846.

== Civil War operations ==
=== Built for the relief of Fort Sumter ===
Thomas Freeborn was one of three steam tugs chartered by the Navy in April 1861 for use in the unsuccessful Fort Sumter relief expedition. She was detained at New York City, however, and did not sail with the other two ships, USS Yankee and Uncle Ben.

On 7 May, she was purchased by the Union Navy and, under the command of Comdr. James H. Ward, joined the newly formed "Flying Flotilla" as his flagship. She departed New York City on 16 May for duty in the Chesapeake Bay and at Hampton Roads, Virginia.

=== Operations in the Virginia area ===
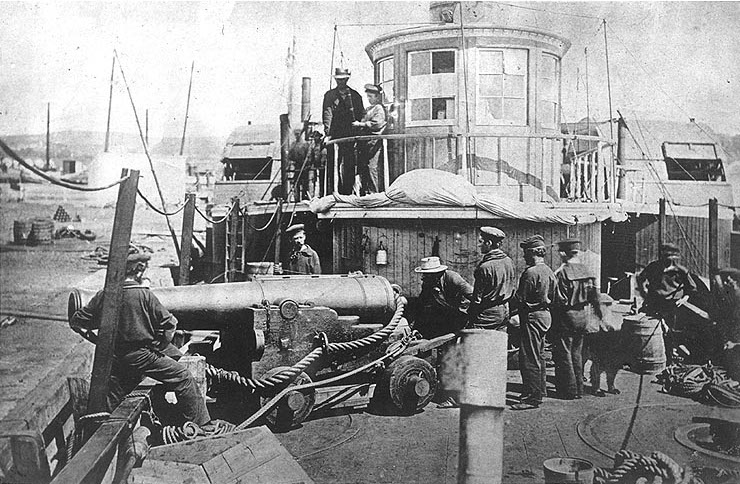
The steam tug USS Thomas Freeborn in 1861. The photo shows some of the ship's officers and men demonstrating how her late commanding officer, Commander James H. Ward, was sighting her bow gun when he was mortally wounded on 27 June 1861, during an action with Confederate forces at Mathias Point, Virginia. The gun is a 32-pounder smoothbore, of 60 hundredweight, on a "Novelty Carriage". This mounting was developed by Commander Ward before the Civil War

In Hampton Roads, USS Monticello and Thomas Freeborn engaged Confederate batteries at Sewell's Point, Virginia, on 19 May. The next day, Thomas Freeborn carried Senators Benjamin F. Wade, Zachariah Chandler, and Robert Morrill to Washington, returning to Hampton Roads on 22 May.

She again sailed for the Washington Navy Yard on 23 May and took part in the Union occupation of Alexandria, Virginia, on the 24th. Thomas Freeborn deployed on permanent blockade and patrol duty in the Potomac River on 27 May.

There, USS Anacostia, USS Resolute, and Thomas Freeborn fired on and silenced Confederate batteries at Aquia Creek, Virginia, on the last day of May. On 24 June, Thomas Freeborn and USS Pawnee shelled Confederate installations at Mathias Point, Virginia, after having received sporadic shore fire from the batteries earlier. Casualties included Commander James H. Ward who was shot and killed while attempting to land on the point during the evening of 27 June. Thomas Freeborn returned to the Washington Navy Yard for repairs on 12 July.

=== Return to the Potomac River Flotilla after repairs at Washington ===
Thomas Freeborn soon rejoined the flotilla, capturing sloop A. B. Leon off White House Point, Virginia, on 26 July 1861. On 4 August, she captured schooner Pocahantas and sloop Mary Grey in Pohick Creek, Virginia, and, on 10 November, received fire from Confederate batteries on Maryland Point, Virginia, but sustained no damage.

Thomas Freeborn captured schooner Mail and her cargo of salt in Coan River, Virginia, on 1 August 1862, and seized and burned schooner Arctic in Maryland's Great Wicomico River on 15 September. She captured sloop Thomas Reilly on 1 October at the mouth of Quantico Creek, Virginia.

=== Crew goes ashore to cut telegraph lines ===
A landing party from Thomas Freeborn cut telegraph lines stretching from Occoquan and Fredericksburg, Virginia, to Richmond, Virginia, on 4 October 1862. On 21 February 1863, USS Dragon and Thomas Freeborn engaged a Confederate battery near Fort Lowry, Virginia; each vessel received minor damage. Thomas Freeborn helped Yankee, USS Fuchsia, and USS Tulip destroy a Confederate encampment under construction at Carter's Creek, Virginia, on 29 April.

The vessel spent the remainder of 1863 and all of 1864 on patrol and reconnaissance duty along the Potomac River.

=== Searching for the assassins of President Lincoln ===
Thomas Freeborn was repaired at the Washington Navy Yard in early January 1865. Returning to duty, she captured blockade runner William Smith on 3 March in the Piankatank River, Virginia. On 17 April, she was ordered by the Secretary of War, Edwin M. Stanton, to patrol the Chesapeake Bay from Point Lookout, Maryland, to the mouth of the Patuxent River, Maryland, in search of the assassins of President Abraham Lincoln.

Finding nothing, she was ordered to proceed to Cherrystone, Virginia, on 1 May 1865 and warned of the expected arrival of Confederate ram CSS Stonewall from Europe. The steamer returned to the Washington Navy Yard later in the month.

== Post-war decommissioning and redocumentation ==
Thomas Freeborn was decommissioned at the Washington Navy Yard on 17 June 1865 and was sold at auction there on 20 July to Anthony Raybold. She was redocumented as Philip on 14 September 1865 and finally disposed of in 1887.

== See also ==
- Union Blockade
