= Blossom (pilot boat) =

New York Pilot boat

History

United States
- Name: Blossom
- Owner: New York Pilots
- Operator: James Mitchell, Thomas Freeborn
- In service: ca. 1837
- Homeport: New York

General characteristics
- Class & type: Schooner
- Propulsion: sails
- Sail plan: Schooner-rigged

The Blossom was a 19th-century Sandy Hook pilot boat built for the New York pilots around 1837. She helped transport maritime pilots between inbound or outbound ships coming into the New York Harbor. In 1839, she came across the Slave ship La Amistad. In 1840, there were only eight New York pilot boats, the Blossom being No. 5. Pilot Thomas Freeborn of the Blossom boarded the packet ship John Minturn and tried to guide the ship in bad weather. He was one of thirty-eight passengers that died near the Jersey Shore in 1846.

== Construction and service ==
On 28 December 1837, the pilot boat Blossom was twenty miles from Sandy Hook, when she met up with the packet ship Sheridan from Liverpool. It was believed that the ship had on board a copy of the Queen's speech. On 6 March 1838, the Blossom met up with the brig William Henry from Matanzas, Cuba, 60 miles south east from Sandy Hook.

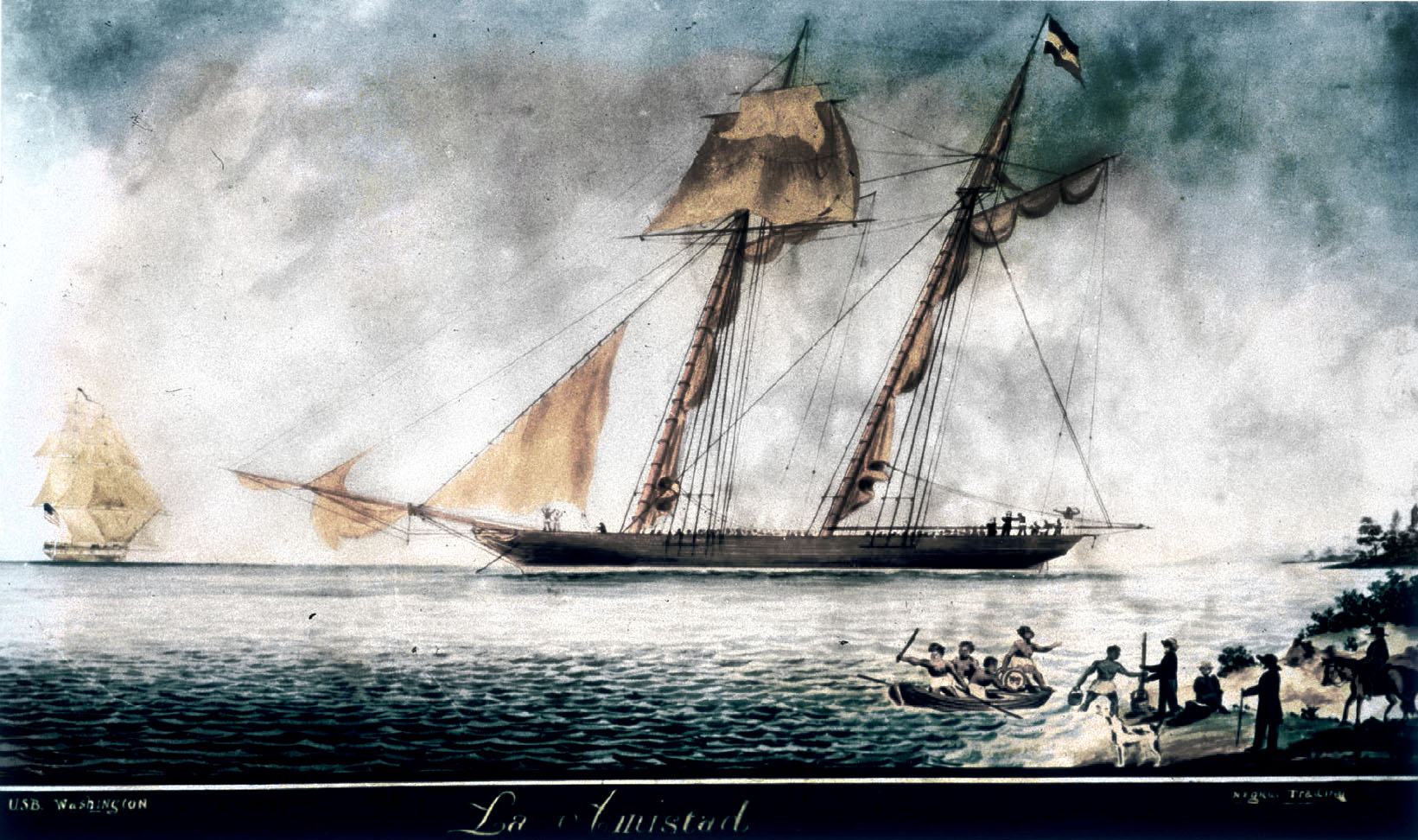
Baltimore schooner La Amistad.

On 21 August 1839, the pilot-boat Blossom came across the Baltimore schooner La Amistad. She was discovered thirty miles southeast of Sandy Hook with 25-30 black men, who requested something to eat and drink. She supplied the men with water and bread. When they attempted the board the pilot-boat to escape, the captain of the Blossom cut the rope that was attached to the Amistad. The pilots then communicated what they felt was a Slave ship to the Collector of the Port of New York. They were later captured by the U.S. Navy off Montauk, New York and detained in New London, Connecticut.

In 1840, there were only eight New York pilot boats. They were the Phantom, No. 1; Washington, No. 2; New York, No. 3; Jacob Bell, No. 4; Blossom, No. 5; T. H. Smith, No. 6; John E. Davidson, No. 7; and the Virginia, No. 8. James Mitchell was listed as the pilot of the pilot boat Blossom.

On 19 December 1843, in the dark of night, the Blossom ran into the schooner Harriet Smith a few miles off Sandy Hook. The Blossom had no lookout stationed forward but the schooner did. The district court ruled that the schooner should be compensated for her damages of $62.60.

On 15 March 1844, an Admiral of the New York Clipper Boats thanked the pilots of the Charlotte Ann, Jacob Bell, Blossom, and Joseph N. Lord for their service and for the fact that they have often been boarded two hundred miles at sea by New York pilots.

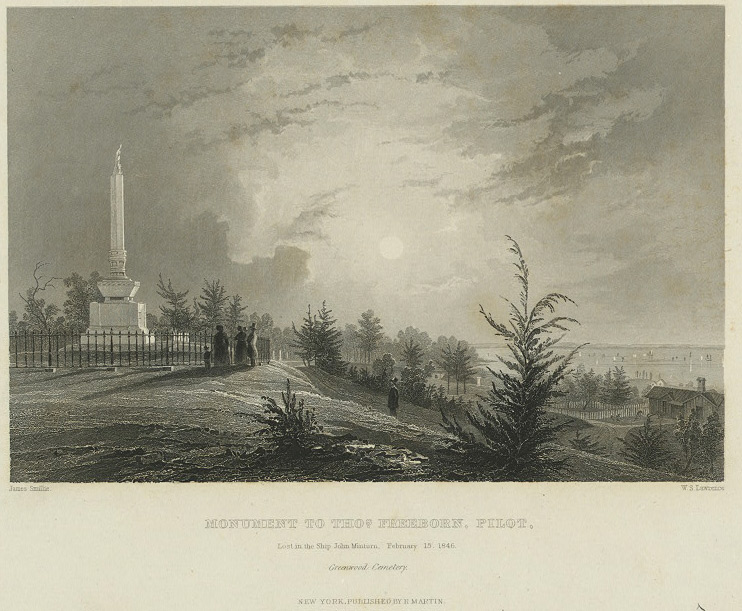
Monument to Thomas Freeborn.

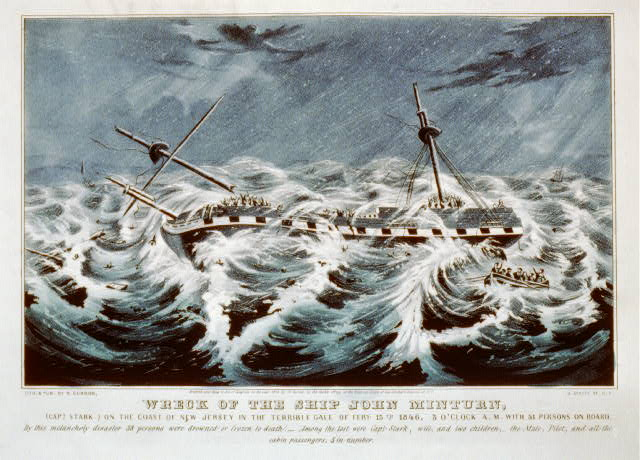
Packet ship John Minturn.

On 14 February 1846, the Blossom was cruising at sea. She put Pilot John Oxer on the brig Moses. She then sighted the ship Orleans and packet ship John Minturn, that she sailed to hoping to put a pilot on board. Both ships declined the Blossom's services because they favored the New Jersey and underwriters' pilots. The Blossom belonged to the old New York fleet. When the weather got bad, the John Minturn took on the Blossom's Pilot Thomas Freeborn. The bark New Jersey took on another of the Blossom's pilots. The Blossom headed home with boatkeeper Thomas Orr in command. Pilot Thomas Freeborne ran into trouble on the John Minturn when trying to guide the ship in bad weather. The ship was pushed toward the Jersey Shore and ran ashore on Squan Beach. Thirty-eight out of fifty-one persons perished including Pilot Thomas Freeborne. The disaster was commemorated in an 1846 lithograph by Currier and Ives. The 1846, wreck sparked the development of the United States Life-Saving Service, an agency that would assist shipwrecked crews and passengers. The Pilots' Monument to Thomas Freeborn was built by James D. Smillie in 1847 and is at the Green-Wood Cemetery.

On 5 September 1848 the Blossom was stationed at the Breakwater when a bark ran into her causing some damage that needed repairs.

== End of service ==
The last report of the Blossom was on 25 December 1851 when she helped rescue the sloop Albano of Melville, New York, that had drifted and struck the Ice Breaker. Joseph Davis of the Blossom towed the sloop safely into the Breakwater.

== See also ==
- Pilot boats.
- List of Northeastern U. S. Pilot Boats
