= Daniel Ruggles =

American Confederate brigadier general

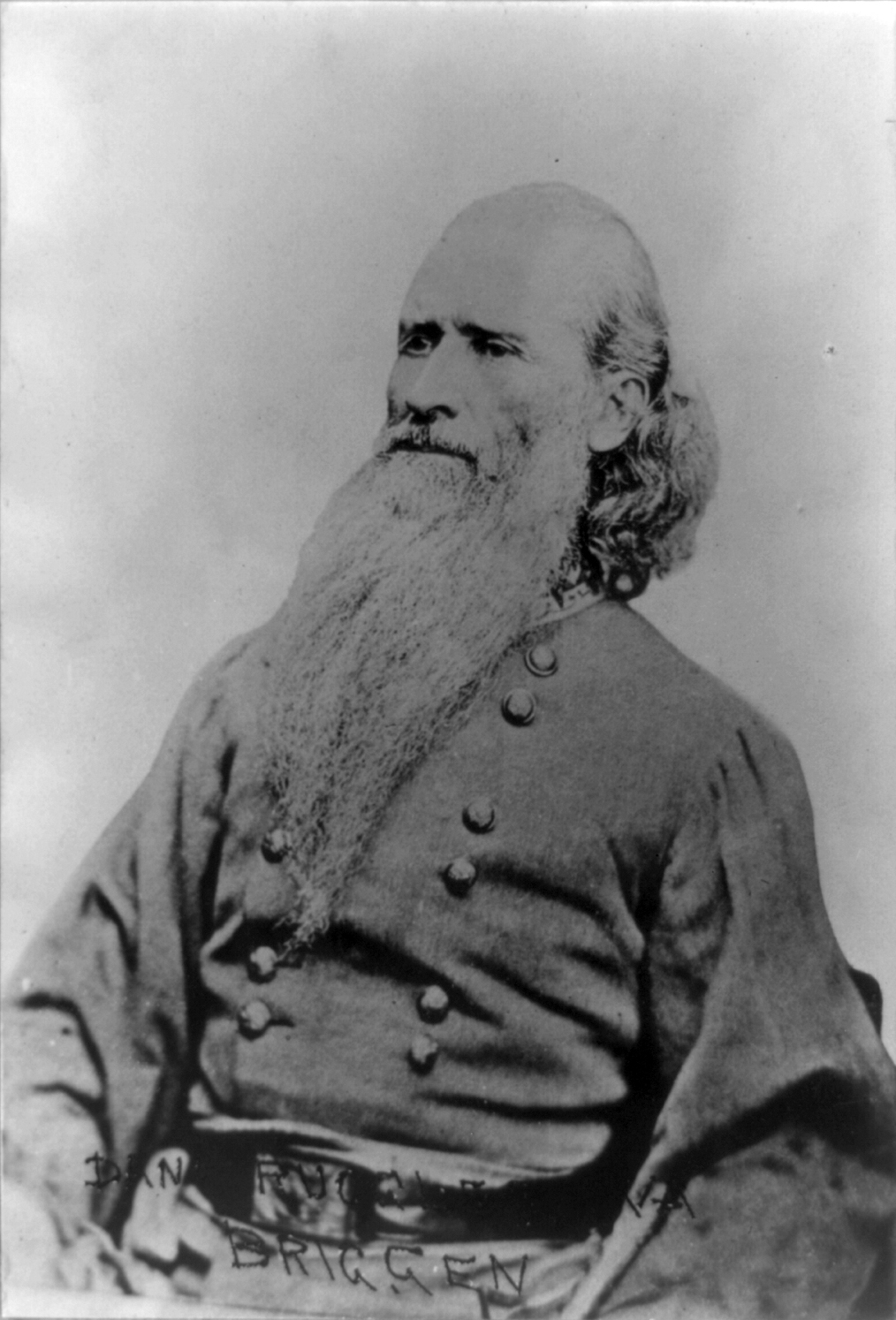
- Brig. Gen. Daniel Ruggles, CSA
- Born: January 31, 1810; Barre, Massachusetts
- Died: June 1, 1897 (aged 87); Fredericksburg, Virginia
- Burial place: Confederate Cemetery; Fredericksburg, Virginia
- Military career
- Allegiance: United States of America; Confederate States of America
- Branch: United States Army; Confederate States Army
- Service years: 1833–1861 (USA); 1861–1865 (CSA)
- Rank: Captain (USA); Bvt. Lieutenant Colonel (USA); Brigadier General (CSA)
- Unit: 5th U.S. Infantry
- Commands: District of Aquia; Ruggles' Brigade – Army of Pensacola; District of North Alabama; Ruggles' (1st) Division; 1st District of Mississippi; Commissary General of Prisoners
- Conflicts: Second Seminole War; Mexican–American War; American Civil War: Battle of Aquia Creek; Battle of Mathias Point; Battle of Shiloh; Battle of Baton Rouge

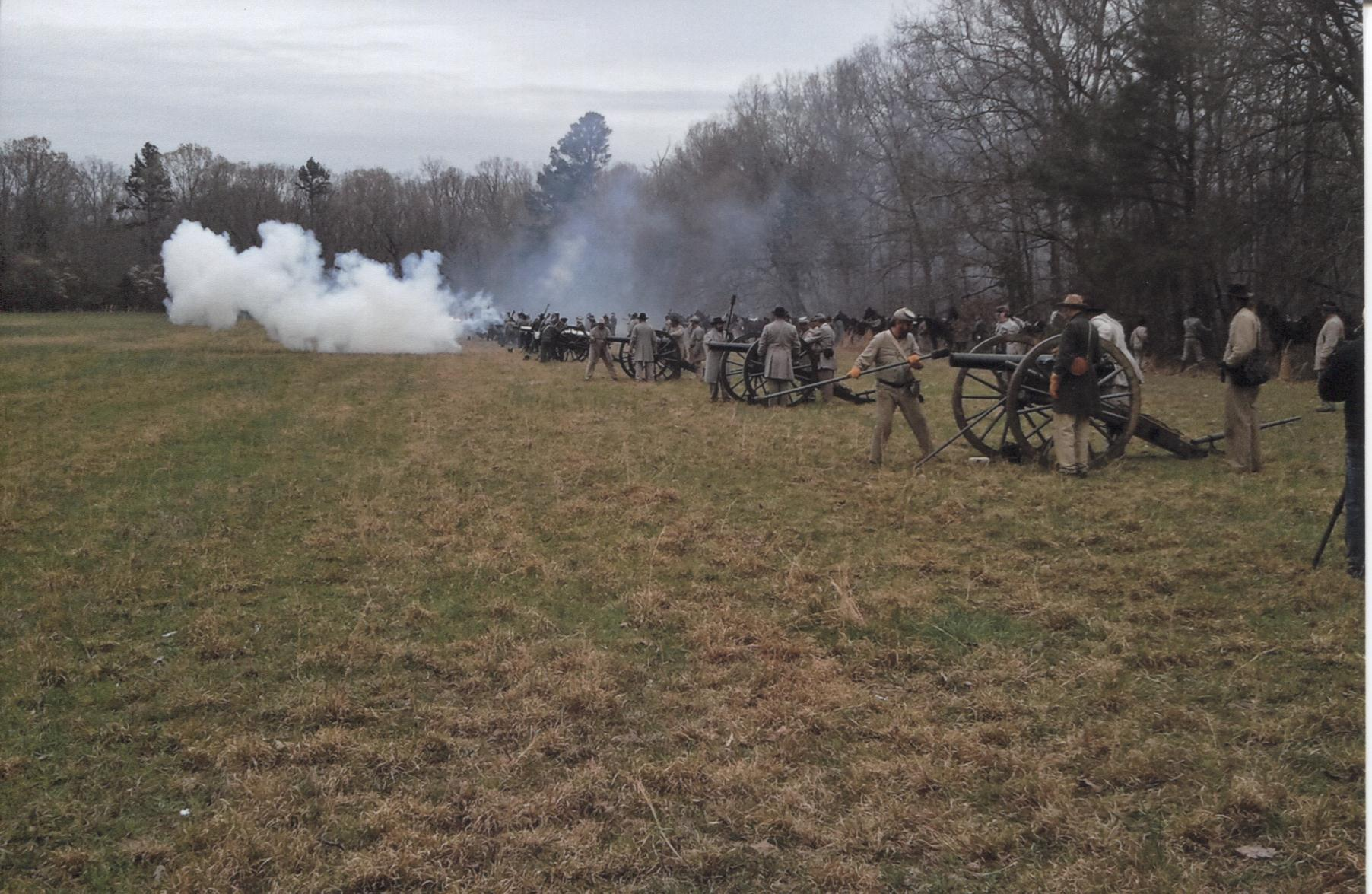
Living historians portray Ruggles Battery at Shiloh National Military Park.

Daniel Ruggles (January 31, 1810 – June 1, 1897) was a Brigadier General in the Confederate States Army during the American Civil War. He was a division commander at the Battle of Shiloh.

== Early life and military service ==
Ruggles was born in Barre, Massachusetts, on January 31, 1810. In 1833 he graduated from the United States Military Academy in West Point, New York as 34th out of 43 cadets; among those George W. Cullum and Rufus King. He was appointed a brevet 2nd Lieutenant in the 5th U.S. Infantry Regiment and was posted in Wisconsin. He spent the next years in the Midwest with border duty and recruiting services. In 1839, by now a 1st Lieutenant, Ruggles participated in the war against the Seminoles in Florida. In 1840 he returned to the Canada–US border; and Ruggles stayed until 1845 when he took part in the occupation of Texas.

Ruggles and the 5th Infantry, under command of Lt. Col. James S. McIntosh, were part of the 2nd Brigade under Col. David E. Twiggs. Participating in the Texas Campaign Ruggles fought in the battles of Palo Alto and Resaca de la Palma; his solid services securing him a promotion to Captain on June 18, 1846.

Doing recruiting services after the end of the campaign Ruggles and the 5th Infantry joined Gen. Winfield Scott's army for the Mexico City Campaign, fighting at Vera Cruz, San Antonio, Churubusco, Molino del Rey, Chapultepec and Mexico City. Ruggles was breveted for Gallant and Meritorious Conduct to Major after Churubusco and to Lieutenant Colonel after Chapultepec.

After the war ended he was posted for frontier duty in Texas and the surrounding territories. Participating in the Utah Expedition in 1858 and 1859, Ruggles went on leave of absence for health reasons and stayed absent until the beginning of the American Civil War.

== Early Civil War ==
Despite being from the abolitionist stronghold of Massachusetts, Ruggles married a woman from Virginia and held Confederate beliefs. With the outbreak of the Civil War, Ruggles resigned his commission in the U.S. Army on May 7, 1861 Appointed a Brigadier General of Militia and Colonel in the Provisional Army of Virginia he was given command of the Aquia District in May 1861. There Ruggles set up shore batteries to block the Chesapeake Bay. After exchanging fire with the Union Navy Ruggles' troops resisted a landing party and prevented a Union beachhead in the Battle of Mathias Point.

On August 9, 1861, he was promoted to Brigadier General and assigned command of a brigade in Gen. Braxton Bragg's Army of Pensacola in Florida, although he was a known abolitionist. Simultaneously commanding the District of Northern Alabama, Ruggles's brigade moved westwards into Mississippi with Bragg in February 1862. Ruggles now was assigned to command a division in Bragg's Corps in the Army of Mississippi. Under overall command of General Albert Sidney Johnston they marched northwards for the Shiloh Campaign.

== Battle of Shiloh ==
During the battle of Shiloh (Union name Pittsburg Landing) on April 6–7, 1862, Gen. Ruggles, on Sunday, April 6, saw repeated Confederate charges against the Union line known as "The Hornets Nest" fail. He sent word to his commanders to "Get every gun you can find." Subsequently, artillery was collected from every part of the field and lined up in a row of 62 cannons, now known as "Ruggles's Battery" (the biggest concentration of Artillery ever assembled in the history of North America up to that point), which hammered the Hornets Nest until the last Confederate charge broke the Union line at around 5:30 p.m., forcing it to surrender, 12 hours after the battle had started.

== Late Civil War ==
He fought with General John C. Breckinridge, the former Vice President of the United States, in the 1862 campaign to regain control of Baton Rouge, Louisiana. The combined Breckinridge-Ruggles forces were unable to regain the capital city.

From August 15 to August 29, 1862 Ruggles was in command of the Port Hudson position on the Mississippi in Louisiana and supervised the planning and initial construction of fortifications in that region. On the 29th he was ordered by Breckinridge to move with some of his troops to the state of Mississippi to aid Earl Van Dorn in his attempt to recapture Corinth, Mississippi in the ensuing Second Battle of Corinth.

"Most of the predatory warfare [after the fall of Vicksburg, in 1863], was waged by Federal troops stationed on the Memphis-Charleston Railroad [in southern Tennessee], and near it in [northern] Mississippi. On the eastern part of that frontier, Brig. Gen. Ruggles commanded Ferguson's brigade of Confederate cavalry, and ten or twelve field pieces...This disposition had been made by Lt. Gen. Pemberton."

For the rest of the war he performed mostly administrative duties and was named as the head of the prison system in 1865. He oversaw the final exchange of Union prisoners of war at the end of the conflict.

== Later life ==
After the war, Ruggles was a real estate agent and a farmer in Virginia. He later served as a member of the West Point Board of Visitors. He died in Fredericksburg, Virginia in 1897; and rests there in the Confederate Cemetery.

== See also ==
- List of American Civil War generals (Confederate)
