= James H. Ward =

United States Navy officer

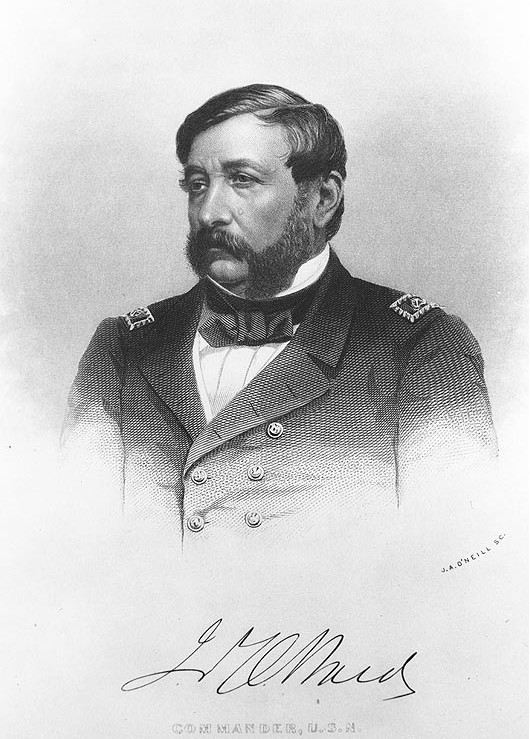
- Born: James Harman Ward; September 25, 1806; Hartford, Connecticut, U.S.
- Died: June 27, 1861 (aged 54); King George County, Virginia, U.S.
- Education: American Literary Scientific and Military Academy; Washington College
- Occupation: U.S. Navy commander
- Family: Andy Devine (great-grandson)
- Military career
- Allegiance: United States
- Branch: United States Navy
- Service years: 1823–1861
- Rank: Commander
- Commands: USS Cumberland; USS Vixen; USS Jamestown
- Known for: First U.S. Navy officer killed in the American Civil War
- Conflicts: Mexican-American War; American Civil War: Battle of Aquia Creek; Battle of Mathias Point †

James Harmon Ward (September 25, 1806 – June 27, 1861) was the first officer of the United States Navy who was killed during the American Civil War.

== Biography ==
Born at Hartford, Connecticut, Ward received his early educational training in Connecticut common schools before attending the American Literary Scientific and Military Academy at Norwich, Vermont. After graduating in 1823, Ward accepted an appointment as a midshipman in the Navy on March 4, 1823. Subsequently, he served on the frigate Constitution during a four-year Mediterranean cruise and then received a year's leave of absence for scientific studies at Washington College, Hartford, Connecticut (now Trinity College).

When Ward returned to sea, he served once more in the Mediterranean and then saw duty off the African coast in interdicting the slave trade. He next served in the West Indies, helping to prevent a resurgence of piracy.

Upon his return to the United States, he taught courses in ordnance and gunnery at the Naval School at Philadelphia, Pennsylvania. These courses were later published as An Elementary Course of Instruction in Ordnance and Gunnery.

On October 10, 1845, the new Naval Academy opened in Annapolis, Maryland; Lt. Ward was one of the five founders of this naval academy. He was one of the first line officers to pass along the benefits of his own experience to young midshipmen. One of the most scholarly officers of the Navy of his day, Ward held the office of executive officer (a post which later became that of the Commandant of Midshipmen), with collateral duties as instructor of gunnery and steam engineering.

The advent of the war with Mexico prompted many naval officers and men to seek assignments on ships serving in Mexican waters. Detached from the academy, Ward took command of the USS Cumberland in 1847 and served in that capacity for the duration of the war. After a period spent waiting for orders, he was given command of the steamer USS Vixen in 1848 and remained on her through 1850.

After intermittent periods awaiting orders and serving at the Washington and Philadelphia Navy Yards, Ward took command of the USS Jamestown and took her to the African coast to hunt slave ships. During this time, in his off-duty hours, he proceeded to work on another textbook—A Manual of Naval Tactics—a scholarly work which would run to four editions after its initial publication in 1859.

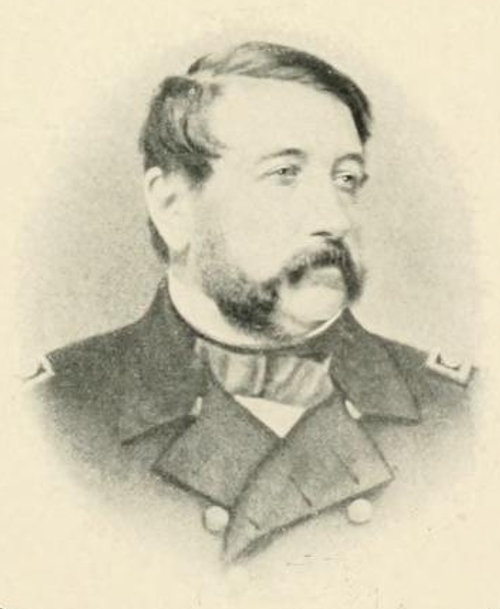
James Harman Ward

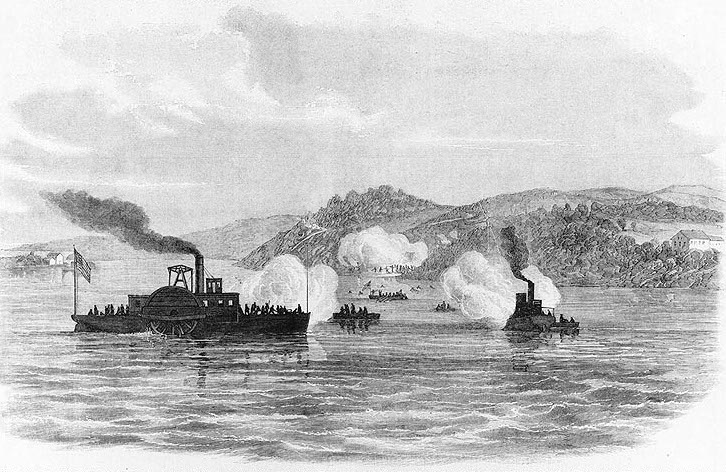
The steam tug USS Thomas Freeborn [left] at Mathis Point June 27, 1861

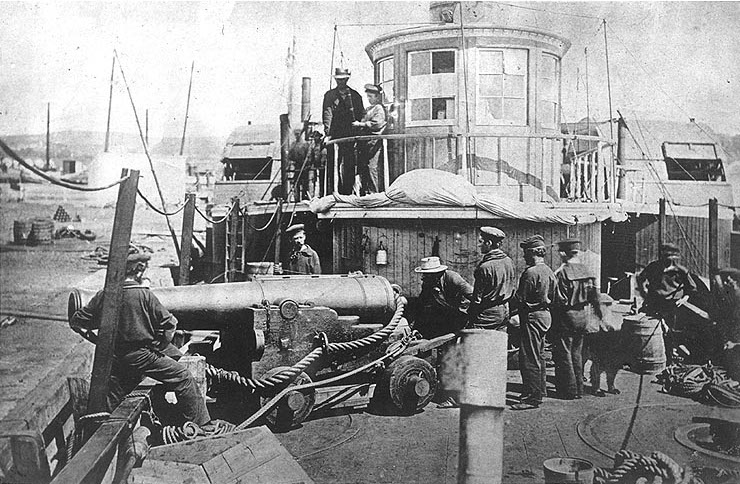
The steam tug USS Thomas Freeborn in 1861. The photo shows some of the ship's officers and men demonstrating how her late commanding officer, Commander James H. Ward, was sighting her bow gun when he was mortally wounded on 27 June 1861, during an action with Confederate forces at Mathias Point, Virginia. The gun is a 32-pounder smoothbore of 60 hundredweight, on a "Novelty Carriage". This mounting was developed by Commander Ward before the Civil War

In 1860, Ward served at the New York Navy Yard, where he wrote a popular treatise on steam engineering, entitled Steam for the Million. In the spring of 1861, with the Southern states leaving the Union and Confederate forces mounting a siege at Fort Sumter, South Carolina, Gideon Welles summoned Ward to Washington to plan for a relief expedition for Sumter. Ward volunteered to lead it, but opposition, notably from General Winfield Scott (who perceived it as being futile), forced cancellation of the plans.

Ward pressed for front line service, proposing that a "flying squadron" be established in the Chesapeake Bay for use against Confederate naval and land forces threatening that area south of the Union capital. The idea was approved, and the squadron took shape. With the steamer Thomas Freeborn serving as Ward's flagship, the steamers Freelance, Alliance plus three coastal survey ships made up his flotilla.

The newly composed unit—later known as the Potomac Flotilla—saw its first action on June 1, when guns from Ward's ships silenced Confederate shore batteries at Aquia Creek, Virginia during the Battle of Aquia Creek. On June 27, at the Battle of Mathias Point, Ward sent a landing party ashore to dislodge Southern forces from another battery at Mathias Point, in King George County, Virginia, but it encountered heavy resistance. The Federals gave up the attack and retired under heavy sniper and cannon fire to their ships. Ward brought his flotilla in close to the shoreline to provide gunfire support for the retreating landing party. As he was sighting the bow gun in his flagship, Thomas Freeborn, Ward was struck by a bullet in his abdomen and fell to the deck, mortally wounded. He died within an hour. He was the great-grandfather of actor Andy Devine.

== Namesakes ==
USS Ward (DD-139) was named for him, as was Fort Ward, one of the defenses of Washington during the American Civil War.

Ward Hall, site of the US Naval Academy's computing center, is named after James Ward, first commandant of midshipmen.

== See also ==
- Battle of Mathias Point
