= Pilots' Monument =

Memorial at Green-Wood Cemetery

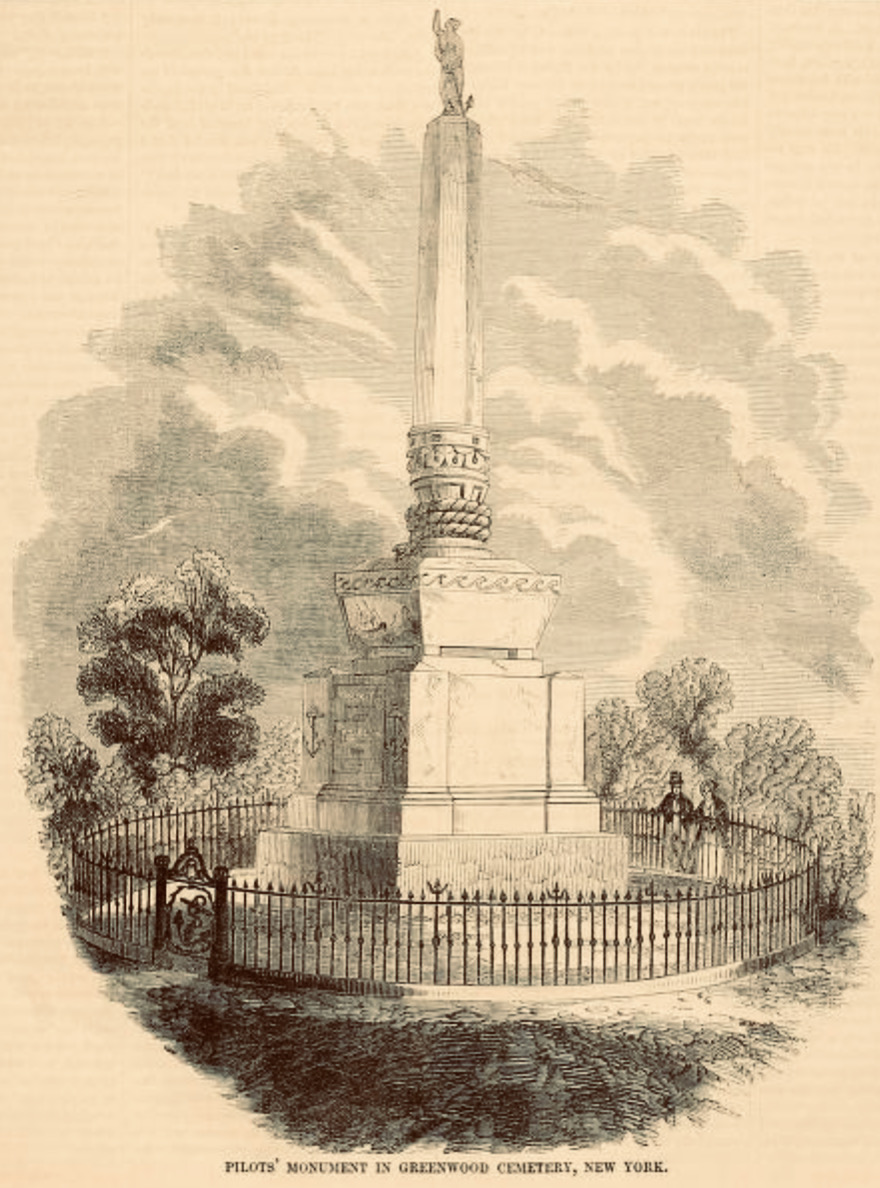
- Pilots' Monument to Thomas Freeborn at Greenwood Cemetery, New York
- Interactive map of Pilots' Monument
- Location: 500 25th Street, Brooklyn, Kings County, New York
- Coordinates: 40°39′09″N 73°59′28″W
- Type: sarcophagus
- Material: marble
- Height: 40
- Completion date: 1847
- Dedicated to: Thomas Freeborn
- Website: Green-Wood Cemetery

The Pilots' Monument is a monument within the Green-Wood Cemetery in Brooklyn, New York City built to commemorate Thomas Freeborn, pilot of the pilot boat Blossom who lost his life while on board the steamship John Minturn. The monument was built by the New York pilots in 1847 and is located at the top of Battle Hill at the Green-Wood Cemetery.

== History ==
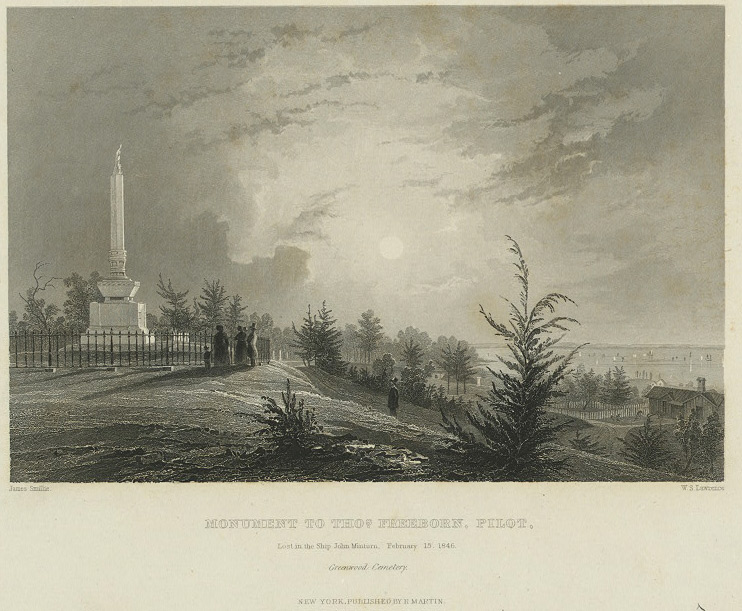
Monument to Thomas Freeborn, Pilot, 19th-century engraving by James D. Smillie.

The Pilots' Monument is the tombstone for the pilot Thomas Freeborn (1808–1846), a New York Sandy Hook pilot. The monument was built in 1847 and is located at Battle Avenue standing upon one of the highest points, at the top of Battle Hill in the Green-Wood Cemetery. It was erected by the New York pilots.

== Thomas Freeborn ==
On February 14, 1846, Freeborn was on the pilot boat Blossom, cruising at sea outside Mantoloking, New Jersey, when he sighted the packet ship John Minturn from New Orleans. Freeborn went on board the John Minturn to guide her safely to port but ran into trouble when trying to guide the ship in an icy hurricane. The ship was pushed toward the Jersey Shore and ran ashore on Squan Beach. Thirty-eight out of fifty-one persons died including Freeborn. Freeborn's death was commemorated in two 1846 lithographs; one by James D. Smillie and another by Nathaniel Currier of Currier and Ives, which show visitors to Green-Wood paying respects at the monument.

== Design ==
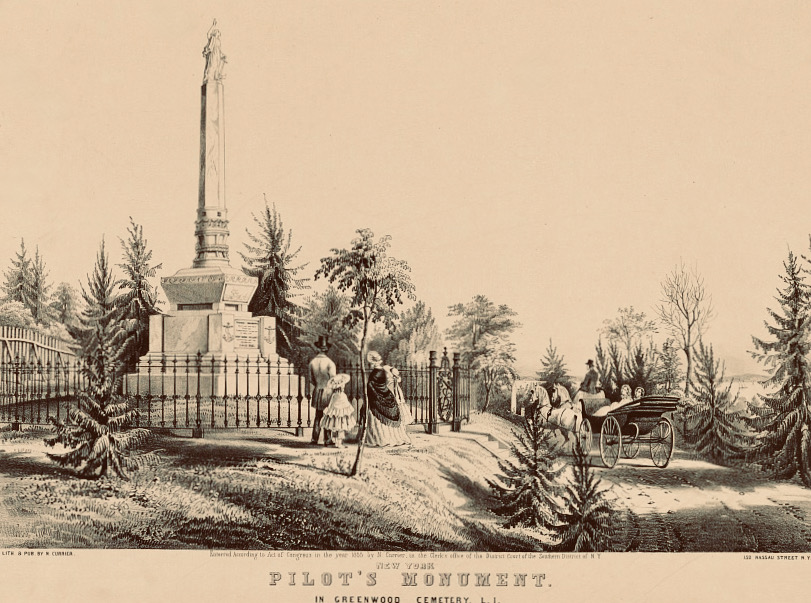
Pilot's Monument in Greenwood Cemetery, illustrated by Nathaniel Currier of Currier and Ives.

The Pilot's Monument consists of a marble shaft 40 feet in height, set on a solid massive square sarcophagus made of marble. The front of the sarcophagus is surrounded with a representative of the actual sea storm and shipwreck. Upon this rests a ship's capstan and cable coiled about it, which is severed at the end. A pillar rises from the capstan that depicts a cutoff mast and crowned with a figure of Hope still holding on to her anchor and pointing to the heaven.
