= Fort Ward (Virginia) =

- U.S. National Register of Historic Places
- Virginia Landmarks Register
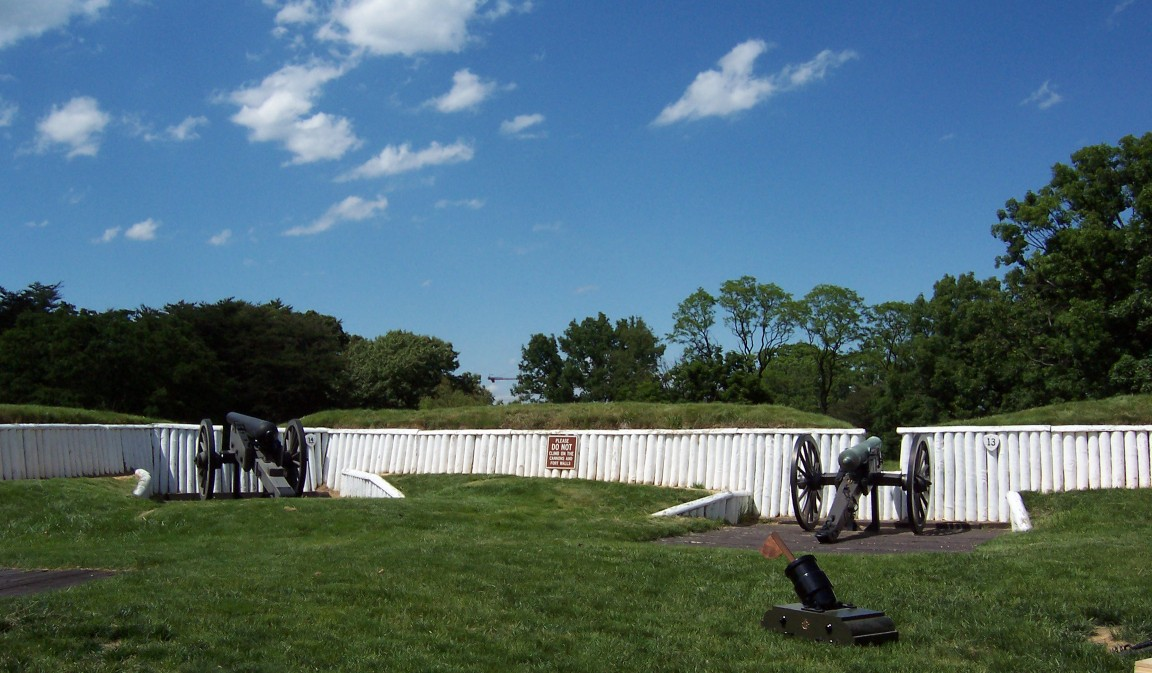
- Fort Ward's restored Northwest Bastion

- Location within Alexandria Location within Northern Virginia Location within Virginia Location within the United States
- Location: 4301 W. Braddock Rd., Alexandria, Virginia
- Coordinates: 38°49′50.9″N 77°6′6.6″W
- Area: 35 acres (14 ha)
- Built: 1861
- Built by: Union Army Corps of Engineers
- NRHP reference No.: 82004538
- VLR No.: 100-0113

Significant dates
- Added to NRHP: August 26, 1982
- Designated VLR: December 15, 1981

Fort Ward
- Part of the Civil War defenses of Washington, D.C.
- Alexandria, Virginia
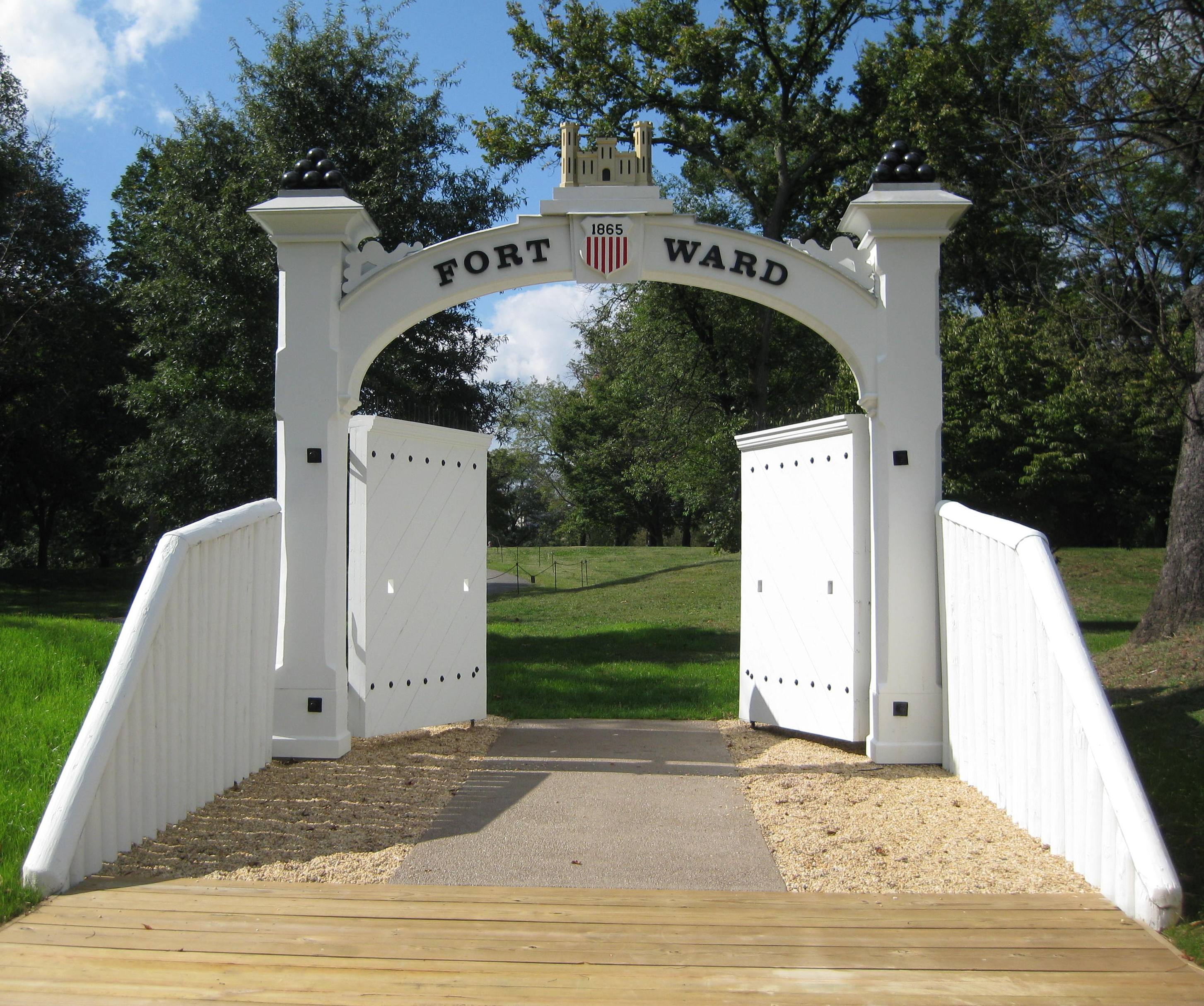
- Gateway near the path between the museum and remnants of the fort

Site information
- Type: Earthwork fort
- Owner: City of Alexandria
- Controlled by: Union Army
- Open to the public: Yes
- Condition: Stabilized

Site history
- Built: 1861
- Built by: U.S. Army Corps of Engineers
- In use: 1861–1865
- Materials: Earth, timber
- Demolished: 1865
- Battles/wars: American Civil War

Fort Ward is a former Union Army installation now located in the city of Alexandria in the U.S. state of Virginia. It was the fifth largest fort built to defend Washington, D.C. in the American Civil War. It is currently well-preserved with 90-95% of its earthen walls intact.

== Occupation of Arlington ==
Before the outbreak of the Civil War, Alexandria County, the closest part of Virginia to Washington, D.C., was a predominantly rural area. Originally part of the District of Columbia, the land now comprising the county was retroceded to Virginia in a July 9, 1846 act of Congress that took effect in 1847. Most of the county is hilly, and at the time, most of the county's population was concentrated in the city of Alexandria, at the far southeastern corner of the county. In 1861, the rest of the county largely consisted of scattered farms, the occasional house, fields for grazing livestock, and Arlington House, owned by Mary Custis, wife of Robert E. Lee.

Following the surrender of Fort Sumter in Charleston, South Carolina, on April 14, 1861, new American president Abraham Lincoln declared that "an insurrection existed," and called for 75,000 troops to be called up to quash the rebellion. The move sparked resentment in many other southern states, which promptly moved to convene discussions of secession. The Virginia State Convention passed "an ordinance of secession" and ordered a May 23 referendum to decide whether or not the state should secede from the Union. The U.S. Army responded by creating the Department of Washington, which united all Union troops in the District of Columbia and Maryland under one command.

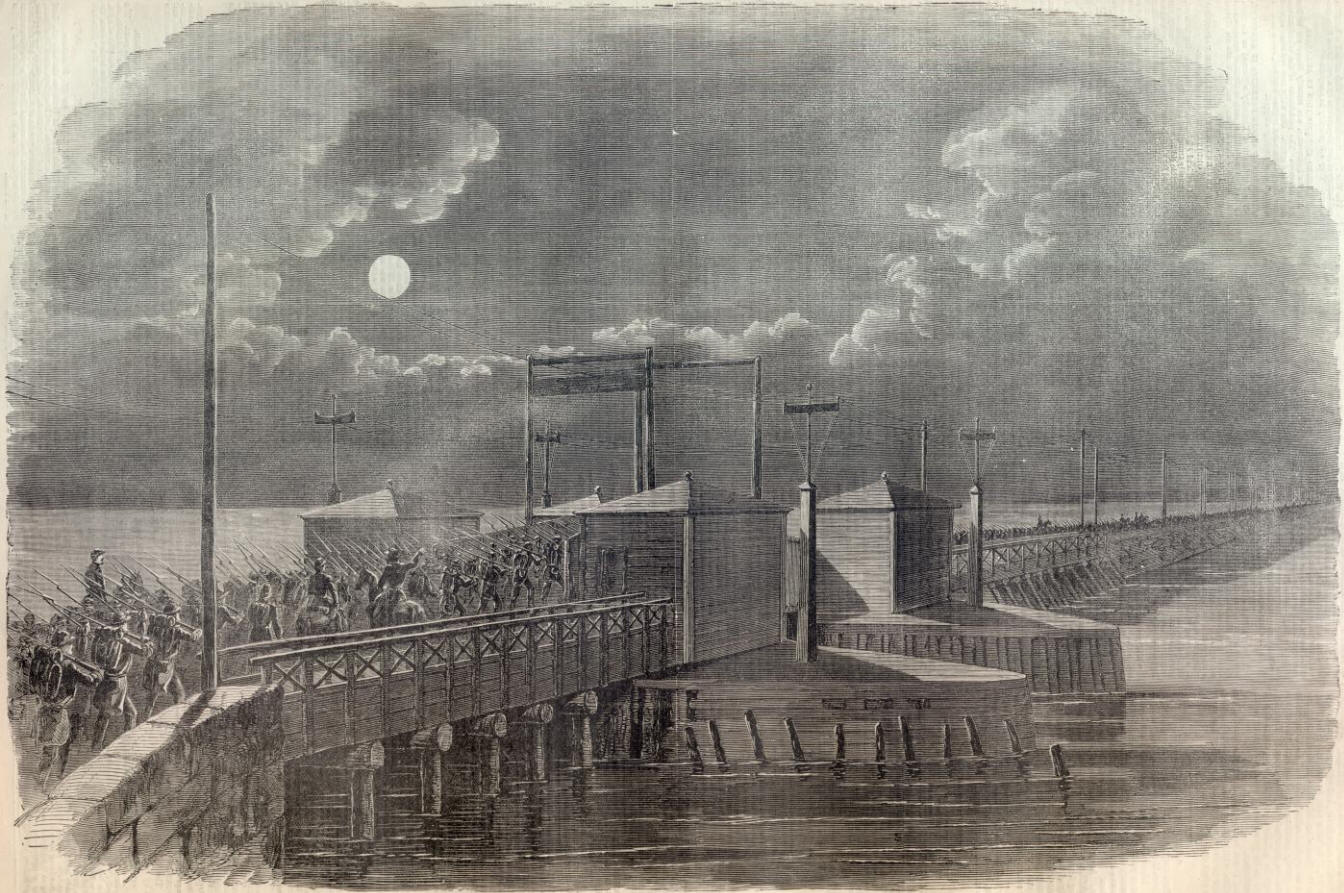
Union soldiers cross the Long Bridge during the occupation of northern Virginia following that state's secession from the Union.

Brigadier General J.F.K. Mansfield, commander of the Department of Washington, argued that Northern Virginia should be occupied as soon as possible in order to prevent the possibility of the Confederate Army mounting artillery on the hills of Arlington and shelling government buildings in Washington. He also urged the erection of fortifications on the Virginia side of the Potomac River to protect the southern terminuses of the Chain Bridge, Long Bridge, and Aqueduct Bridge. His superiors approved these recommendations, but decided to wait until after Virginia voted for or against secession.

On May 23, 1861, Virginia voted by a margin of 3 to 1 in favor of leaving the Union. That night, U.S. Army troops began crossing the bridges linking Washington, D.C. to Virginia. The march, which began at 10 p.m. on the night of the 23rd, was described in colorful terms by the New York Herald two days later:

There can be no more complaints of inactivity of the government. The forward march movement into Virginia, indicated in my despatches last night, took place at the precise time this morning that I named, but in much more imposing and powerful numbers.

About ten o'clock last night four companies of picked men moved over the Long Bridge, as an advance guard. They were sent to reconnoitre, and if assailed were ordered to signal, when they would have been reinforced by a corps of regular infantry and a battery....

At twelve o'clock the infantry regiment, artillery and cavalry corps began to muster and assume marching order. As fast as the several regiments were ready they proceeded to the Long Bridge, those in Washington being directed to take that route.

The troops quartered at Georgetown, the Sixty-ninth, Fifth, Eighth and Twenty-eighth New York regiments, proceeded across what is known as the chain bridge, above the mouth of the Potomac Aqueduct, under the command of General McDowell. They took possession of the heights in that direction.

The imposing scene was at the Long Bridge, where the main body of the troops crossed. Eight thousand infantry, two regular cavalry companies and two sections of Sherman's artillery battalion, consisting of two batteries, were in line this side of the Long Bridge at two o'clock.

The occupation of Northern Virginia was peaceful, with the sole exception of the town of Alexandria. There, as Colonel Elmer E. Ellsworth, commander of the New York Fire Zouaves (11th New York Volunteer Infantry Regiment), entered a local hotel to remove the Confederate flag flying above it, he was shot and killed by James W. Jackson, the proprietor. Ellsworth was one of the first men killed in the American Civil War. Jackson was then killed by invading Federal soldiers of the 11th New York. Throughout the remainder of the war, Alexandria would lean strongly towards the Confederate government, necessitating continued occupation by a Union garrison.

=== Battle of Bull Run ===
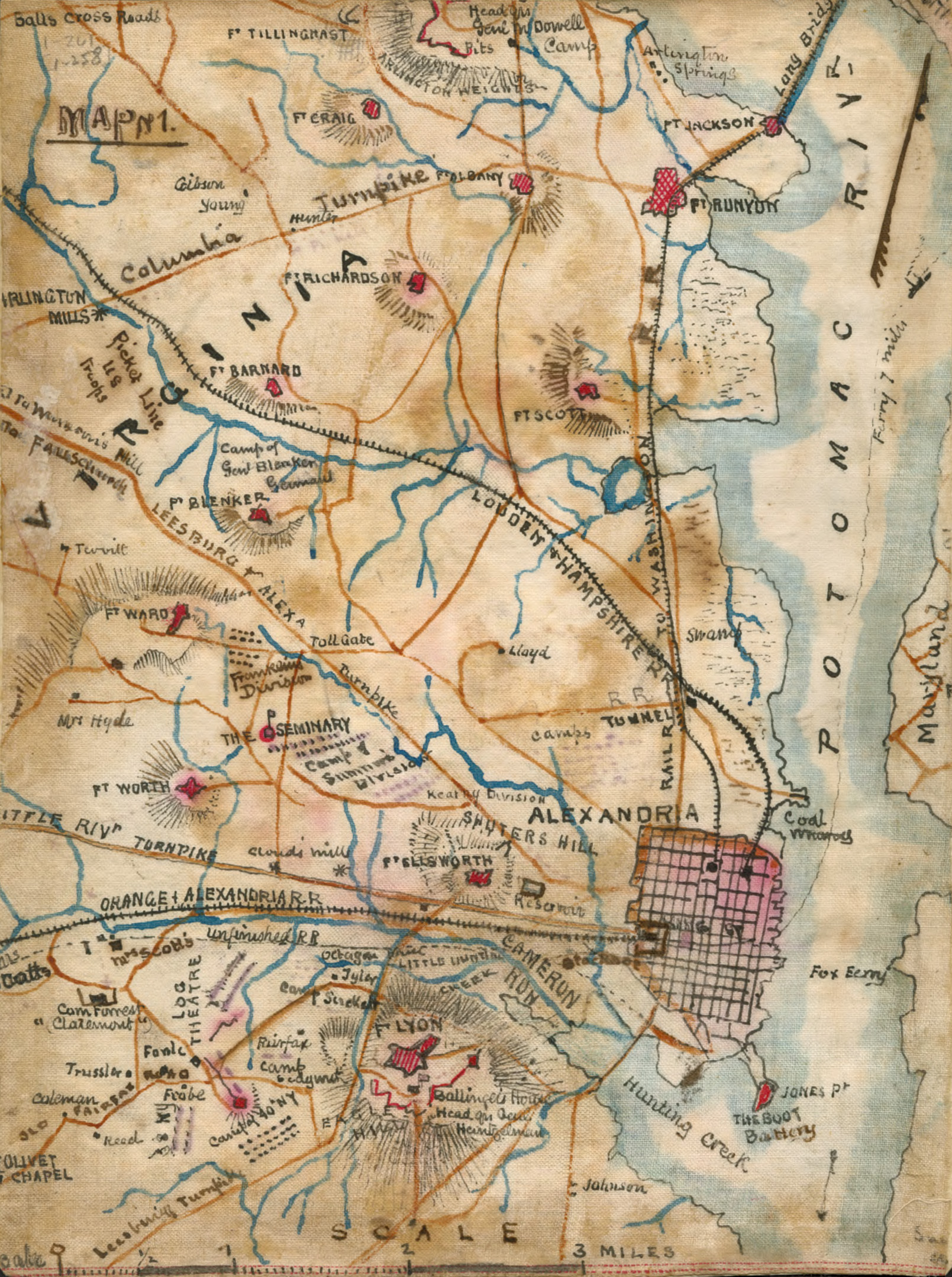
Map of Civil War forts near Alexandria, showing Fort Ward (ca. September 1861)

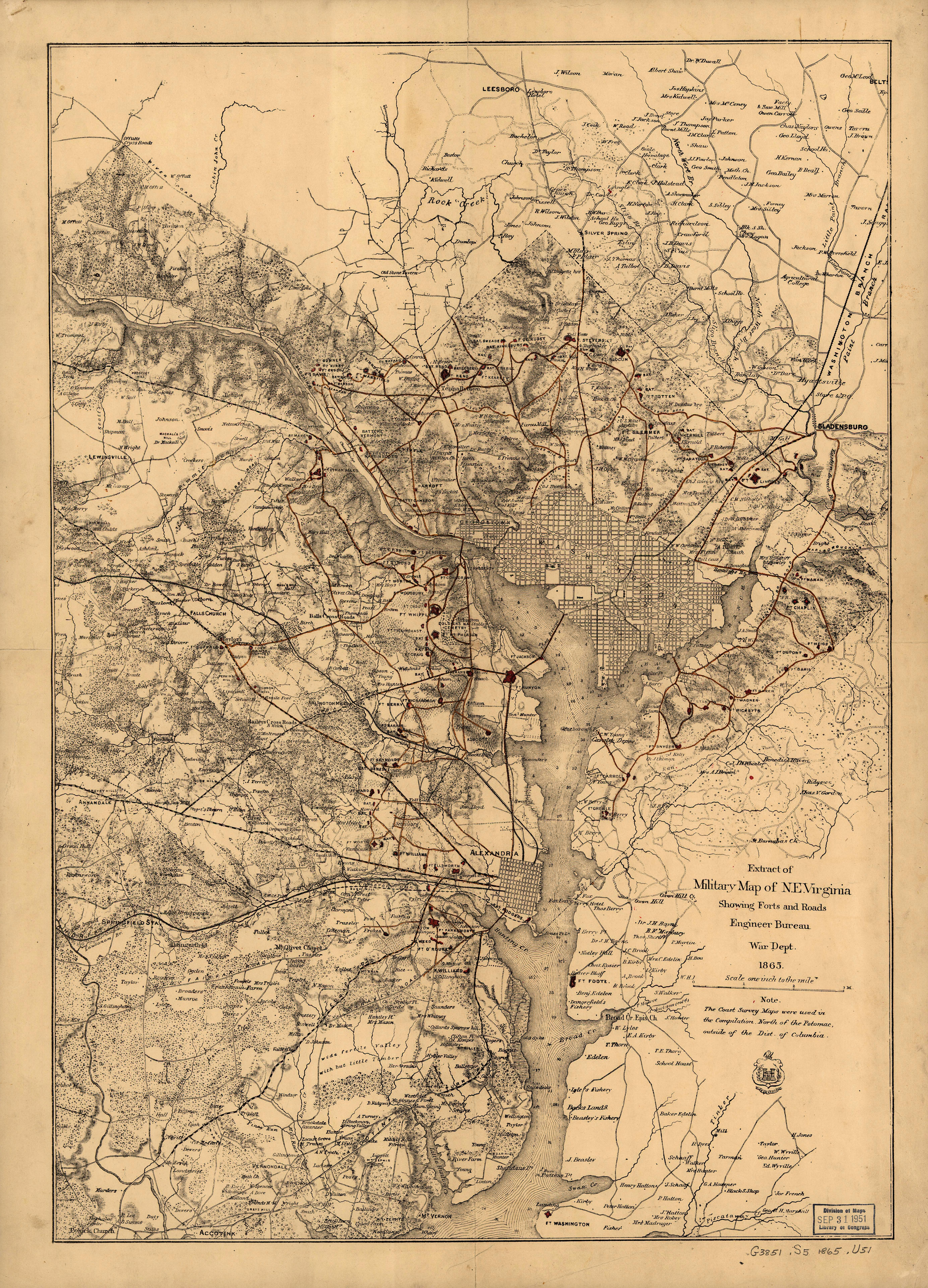
Washington D.C. Fortifications map (1865)

Over the seven weeks that followed the occupation of northern Virginia, forts were constructed along the banks of the Potomac River and at the approaches to each of the three major bridges (Chain Bridge, Long Bridge, and Aqueduct Bridge) connecting Virginia to Washington and Georgetown.

While the Potomac River forts were being built, planning and surveying was ordered for an enormous new ring of forts to protect the city. Unlike the fortifications under construction, the new forts would defend the city in all directions, not just the most direct route through Arlington. In mid-July, this work was interrupted by the First Battle of Bull Run. As the Army of Northeastern Virginia marched south to Manassas, the soldiers previously assigned to construction duties marched instead to battle. In the days that followed the Union defeat at Bull Run, panicked efforts were made to defend Washington from what was perceived as an imminent Confederate attack. The makeshift trenches and earthworks that resulted were largely confined to Arlington and the direct approaches to Washington.

On July 26, 1861, five days after the battle, Maj. Gen. George B. McClellan was named commander of the military district of Washington and the subsequently renamed Army of the Potomac. Upon arriving in Washington, McClellan was appalled by the condition of the city's defenses.

In no quarter were the dispositions for defense such as to offer a vigorous resistance to a respectable body of the enemy, either in the position and numbers of the troops or the number and character of the defensive works... not a single defensive work had been commenced on the Maryland side. There was nothing to prevent the enemy shelling the city from heights within easy range, which could be occupied by a hostile column almost without resistance.

To remedy the situation, one of McClellan's first orders upon taking command was to greatly expand the defenses of Washington. At all points of the compass, forts and entrenchments would be constructed in sufficient strength to defeat any attack. Alexandria, which contained the southern terminus of the Chesapeake and Ohio Canal and one of the largest ports in the Chesapeake Bay, was an object of "anxious study."

== Planning and construction ==
It was named for US Navy Commander James H. Ward, killed at Mathias Point. It was designed with a perimeter of 540 yards and platforms for 24 guns. Later, a 100-pound Parrott gun was added. The larger guns made the fort vulnerable if besieged. In 1863, the perimeter was expanded to 818 yards with room for 36 guns.

Gen. John Newton, who was in charge of the forts south of Four Mile Run, supervised the construction and managed the flow of men and material.

Liberated slaves, also known as "contrabands", helped build the defenses to protect Washington from invasion by Confederate forces during the Civil War. The Fort was named for the first Union naval officer to die in the war. Fort Ward never saw any attacks, and was dismantled in November 1865, though many African- Americans continued to live there into the 1900s.

== Fort Ward Museum ==
The fort is now a part of the City of Alexandria's 45 acres (18 ha) Fort Ward Museum and Historic Site adjacent to Braddock Road, and the museum offers rotating exhibits on American Civil War subjects and a Civil War library. It is listed on the National Register of Historic Places and hosts Civil War and Revolutionary War reenactments. The historic area now includes a museum, an Officer's Hut, Ceremonial Gate, and reconstructed northwest bastion. The site can be found at 4301 West Braddock Road in Alexandria, Virginia.

In the early 1960s, the land was bought by the city of Alexandria to stop a housing development. The city took 44 acres across Braddock Road from Episcopal High School, reconstructed the old fort and made a park.
