= Robert Williams (Medal of Honor) =

American recipient of the Medal of Honor

- Born: c. 1837; New York, New York, U.S.
- Allegiance: United States
- Branch: Navy
- Battles / wars: Yazoo Pass expedition
- Awards: Medal of Honor

Robert Williams (c. 1837–unknown) was an American sailor and recipient of the Medal of Honor during the American Civil War. Little is known about Williams except for information regarding his Medal of Honor action. He served aboard the USS Benton as a signal quartermaster and earned his medal for actions during the Yazoo River (Mississippi) Expedition from December 23–27, 1862, specifically on December 27 at Drumgould's Bluff.

Williams has been listed as "Lost to History" by the Medal of Honor Historical Society of the United States because his burial location is unknown.

== Medal of Honor citation ==
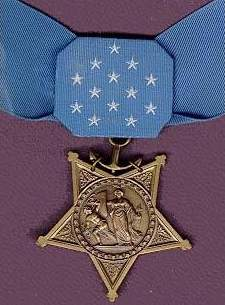

Medal of Honor citation reads:

For extraordinary heroism in action while serving as Quartermaster on board the USS Benton during the Yazoo River (Mississippi) Expedition, 23 to 27 December 1862. Taking part in the hour-and-a-half engagement with the enemy at Drumgould's Bluff, 27 December, Signal Quartermaster Williams served courageously throughout that battle against hostile forces in which the enemy had the dead range of the vessel and were punishing her with heavy fire and, for various other action in which he took part during the Yazoo River Expedition.
