= John Minturn =

Packet ship

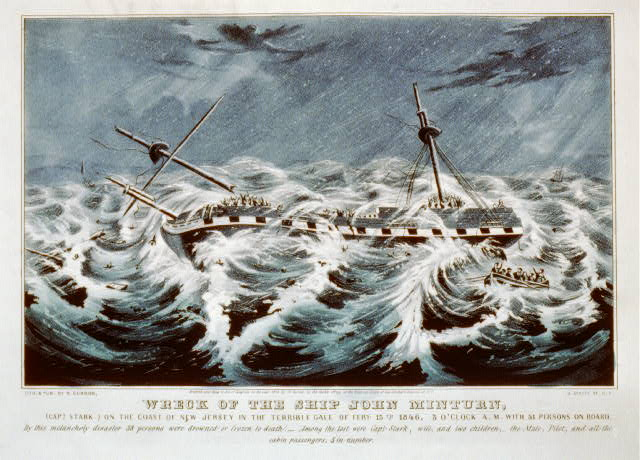
- Wreck of the ship John Minturn by Nathaniel Currier

History

United States
- Name: John Minturn
- Owner: New York Pilots
- Operator: Dudley Stark, Thomas Freeborn
- Out of service: February 14, 1846
- Homeport: New York
- Fate: Wrecked February 14, 1846

General characteristics
- Class & type: packet ship
- Propulsion: sails
- Sail plan: Schooner-rigged

John Minturn was a three-masted packet ship that was lost on February 14, 1846. The ship left New Orleans headed for New York carrying $80,000 in goods and crew and passengers totaling 51 individuals. Captain Dudley Stark was Master of the ship. Her commander was Dudley Stark, who was a native of Stonington, Connecticut. When the weather got bad, John Minturn took on pilot boat Blossom's Pilot Thomas Freeborn who tried to guide the ship to port.

== Construction and service ==
The John Minturn was a three-masted packet ship. Captain Dudley Stark was Master of the ship. She was used as a passenger ship from New Orleans. She had accommodations for cabin, second cabin and steerage passengers.

== End of service ==
The ship was caught in a gale off Mantoloking in Ocean County, New Jersey shore, 4 miles (6.4 km) south of Squan inlet. Thirty-eight lives were lost aboard the ship. This represented the largest loss of life from the storm which claimed upwards of 60 victims. The disaster was immortalized in an 1846 hand-colored lithograph, Pilots' Monument, by Currier and Ives.

Later, newspapers reported widespread plundering of the dead. The reports prompted the New Jersey Senate to appoint a commission to investigate the validity of the claims. In a March 20, 1846, report by the commission to the Senate, the commission found the claims to be unwarranted.

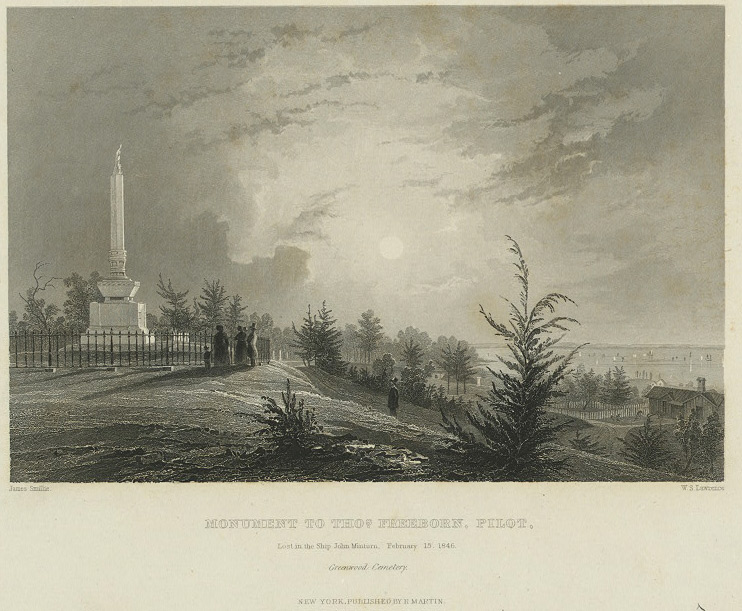
Pilots' Monument to Thomas Freeborn, Pilot, 19th-century engraving by James D. Smillie.

The 1846 wreck sparked the development of the United States Life-Saving Service, an agency that would assist shipwrecked crews and passengers. That service would eventually merge with the United States Coast Guard.

In 1847 the New York Pilots constructed the Pilots' Monument in memory of their comrade pilot Thomas Freeborn (1808-1846). It is located at the top of Battle Hill in the Green-Wood Cemetery.
