= USS Pawnee (1859) =

Gunboat of the United States Navy

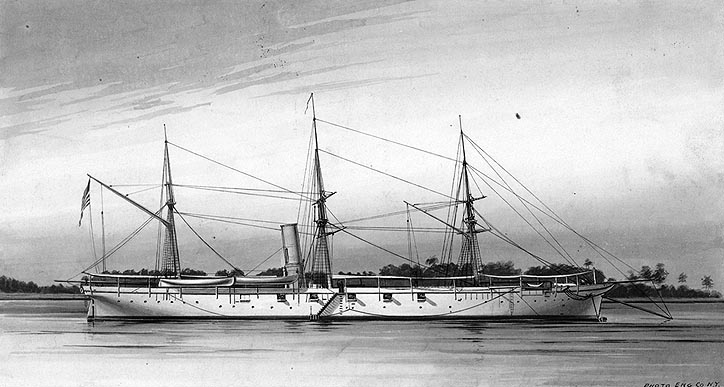
- USS Pawnee, circa 1864–1865

History

United States
- Name: USS Pawnee
- Builder: Philadelphia Navy Yard
- Laid down: 1858
- Launched: 8 October 1859
- Commissioned: 11 June 1860
- Decommissioned: 18 November 1882
- Fate: Sold, 3 May 1884

General characteristics
- Type: Steam sloop-of-war
- Displacement: 1,533 long tons (1,558 t)
- Length: 221 ft 6 in (67.51 m)
- Beam: 47 ft (14 m)
- Draft: 10 ft (3.0 m)
- Propulsion: Steam engine/Sail
- Speed: 10 knots (19 km/h; 12 mph)
- Complement: 181 officers and enlisted
- Armament: 8 × 9 in (230 mm) guns; 2 × 12-pounder guns

The first USS Pawnee was a sloop-of-war in the United States Navy during the American Civil War. She was named for the Pawnee Indian tribe.

Pawnee was laid down in 1858 at the Philadelphia Navy Yard; launched 8 October 1859, sponsored by Miss Grace Tyler; and commissioned 11 June 1860, Commander H. J. Hartstene in command.

== Service history ==
=== Home Squadron, 1860 ===
After shakedown, she departed Philadelphia 24 September with Captain Garrett J. Pendergrast embarked to assume command of the Home Squadron operating off the coast of Mexico. She arrived off Vera Cruz 15 October, and, after a short cruise, returned to Philadelphia 12 December.

=== Civil War, 1861–1865 ===
Pawnee spent the first three months of 1861 in Washington, D.C., and was sent on an expedition to Charleston, South Carolina 6 April to relieve Major Robert Anderson's garrison at Fort Sumter. Delayed by a severe storm, she arrived only to find that the Fort had been surrendered to Confederate forces. She returned to Washington and was immediately dispatched to Norfolk to secure the ships and stores of the Gosport Navy Yard. Arriving at Norfolk the night of 20 April, she found that all ships, save USS Cumberland, had been scuttled, so an attempt was made to destroy the Naval stores and the dry dock. Their efforts were largely unsuccessful, but she assisted the tug Yankee, which towed the frigate Cumberland out of the Yard and saved the ship.

From May to August 1861 Pawnee, based at Washington, operated on the Potomac River, furnishing protection for surveying parties, bombarding Confederate shore batteries, convoying vessels and performing general blockade duty. On 24 May a party from the ship demanded and received the surrender of Alexandria, Virginia. One of Pawnee's crew, Captain of the Maintop John Williams, was awarded the Medal of Honor for his actions at the Battle of Mathias Point in June 1861.

In August Pawnee joined the Atlantic Blockading Squadron at Hampton Roads and sailed on the 26th for the North Carolina coast. There she participated in the attacks on Forts Hatteras and Clark (28–29th), which capitulated and were occupied by U.S. troops. Pawnee remained at Hatteras Inlet until 3 October, capturing four prizes and retaking two vessels previously captured by the Confederates.

On 29 October Pawnee sailed from Hampton Roads on a joint military-naval expedition to Port Royal Sound on the South Carolina coast, which resulted in the capture of an invaluable base for the Union blockade and future amphibious operations. During this engagement Pawnee was struck by seven shells, which killed two of her crew.

During the following year Pawnee continued operations along the coast of South Carolina, Georgia and Florida often sending boat parties into the various rivers and sounds. She took part in the occupation of Fernandina, Florida 3 March 1862, and assisted in the operations on Stono River, South Carolina 28–30 May. Early in November she proceeded north for repairs, arriving Philadelphia on the 10th.

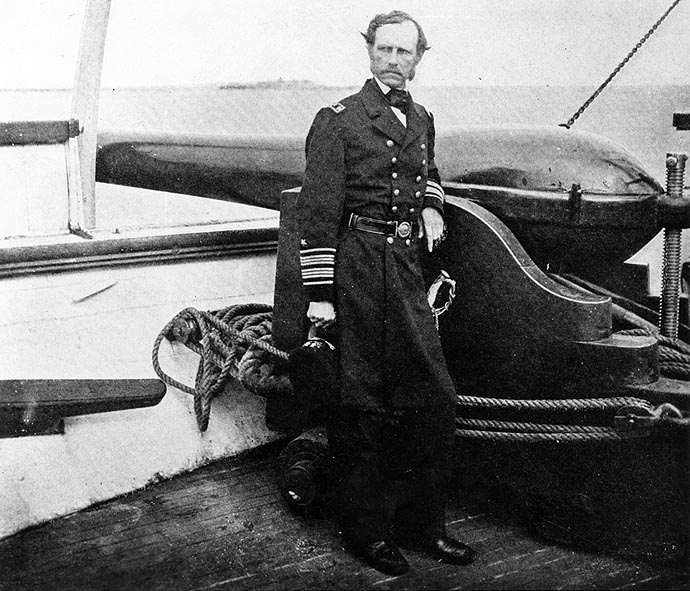
Rear Admiral John A. Dahlgren, on board the Pawnee, beside a 50-pounder Dahlgren rifle.

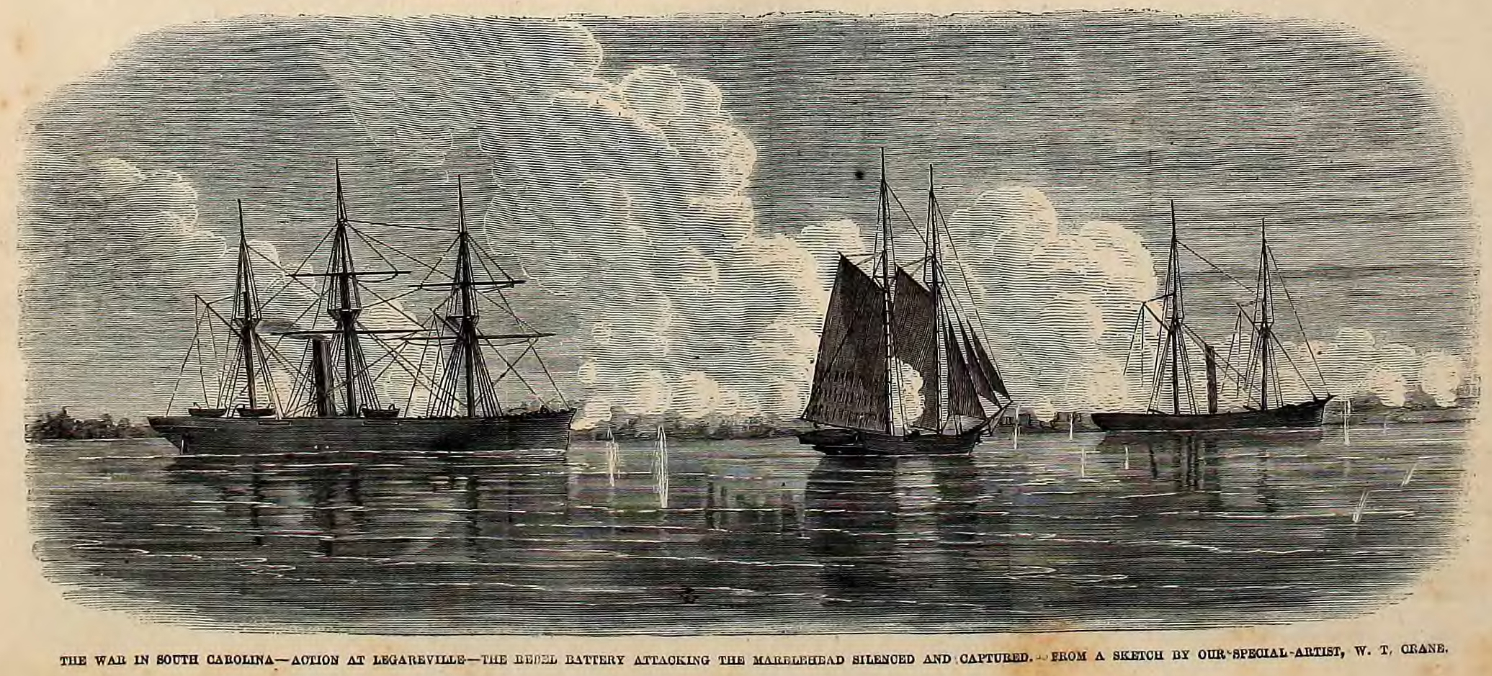
Action at Legareville. The rebel battery attacking the Marblehead silenced and captured, 25 December 1863. Pawnee, far right.

Pawnee departed Philadelphia 6 January 1863, took ironclad USS Patapsco in tow at Hampton Roads, and arrived off Port Royal, South Carolina 10 February. For the remainder of the war, she operated with the South Atlantic Squadron in coastal reconnaissance off the southern states, engaging shore installations, and watching for blockade runners. Between 1 February and 18 June 1864, she assisted in the capture of Confederate steamers General Sumter and Hattie Brock along with their valuable cargoes of cotton, turpentine, rosin and railroad iron. She also participated in the expeditions on Stono River, 1–10 July 1864 and Broad River 29 November 1864.

On 9 February 1865, Pawnee accompanied by USS Sonoma and USS Daffodil, ascended the Togoda Creek, North Edisto, South Carolina and engaged three Confederate batteries, driving the enemy from their earthworks. On 23 February, along with other ships, she occupied Georgetown, South Carolina. Pawnee returned to Washington, D.C., on 21 June and proceeded to Portsmouth where she decommissioned 26 July 1865.

=== South America, 1867–1869 ===
In 1866 she was repaired for further service and she recommissioned 2 January 1867. Sailing from Portsmouth 24 April, she joined her squadron off Rio de Janeiro and operated in that area for two years protecting American citizens and their property during the war between Brazil and Paraguay. On 17 May 1869, she sailed for home, arrived Portsmouth 9 July, and decommissioned 22 July.

=== Hospital ship and storeship, 1870–1882 ===
Following a survey, Pawnee's machinery was removed and she was fitted out as a sailing ship. She transferred to Norfolk, Virginia 6 December 1869 where she was converted to a hospital and storeship. She recommissioned 17 December 1870 and sailed 7 January 1871 for the Gulf of Mexico.

Stationed at Key West, Florida, Pawnee served as a hospital ship and receiving ship for the North Atlantic Station until April 1875 when she was towed to Port Royal, South Carolina for use as a storeship.

She decommissioned 18 November 1882 and was struck from the Navy Register. On 3 May 1884 Pawnee was sold to M. H. Gregory, Great Neck, New York.

== See also ==
- Union Navy
