= List of ship launches in 1860 =

The list of ship launches in 1860 is a chronological list of ships launched in 1860.

Date	Ship	Class / type	Builder	Location	Country	Notes
7 January	Espoir	Philomel-class gunvessel		Pembroke Dockyard	United Kingdom	For Royal Navy.
9 January	Guayaquil	Steamship	Messrs. Laurence Hill & Co.	Port Glasgow	United Kingdom	For Pacific Royal Mail Company.
9 January	Strathdon	Clipper	Messrs. Walter Hood & Co	Aberdeen	United Kingdom	For Messrs. G. Thompson Jr., & Co.
10 January	Olympus	Steamship	Messrs. J. & G. Thompson	Govan	United Kingdom	For Messrs. Burns & M'Iver.
11 January	Ocean Queen	Schooner	John McMurdie	Lytham	United Kingdom	For Messrs. McMurdie, Iddon & Co.
18 January	Borbonne	Frigate		Castellamare di Stabia	Kingdom of the Two Sicilies	For Royal Sicilian Navy.
25 January	Prince of Wales	Modified Queen-class ship of the line		Portsmouth Dockyard	United Kingdom	For Royal Navy.
26 January	Richmond	Sloop-of-war		Norfolk Navy Yard	United States	For United States Navy.
30 January	Veronica	Barque	T. & J. Brocklebank	Whitehaven	United Kingdom	For Thomas & John Brocklebank.
January	John Vanner	Full-rigged ship	J. Haswell	Sunderland	United Kingdom	For John Lidgett & Sons.
January	Joseph Cape	Snow	James Hardie	Southwick	United Kingdom	For Mr. Hargrove.
January	Z. C. Pearson	Steamship	T. R. Oswald	Sunderland	United Kingdom	For Zachariah C. Pearson.
1 February	Hope	Steamship	Messrs. Laurence Hill & Co.	Port Glasgow	United Kingdom	For private owner.
3 February	Mullett	Philomel-class gunvessel	Charles Lungley	Rotherhithe	United Kingdom	For Royal Navy.
4 February	Ocean Mail	Clipper	Messrs. Alexander Hall & Co.	Aberdeen	United Kingdom	For Henry Adamson.
6 February	Samson	Steamship	James Laing	Sunderland	United Kingdom	For Gourley & Co.
7 February	Generosity	Barque	J. Barkes	Sunderland	United Kingdom	For John Barkes.
7 February	Ostrich	Steamship	Messrs. William Denny & Bros.	Dumbarton	United Kingdom	For Burns Line.
8 February	Pelican	Camelion-class sloop	Messrs. W. C. Miller & Son	Liverpool	United Kingdom	For Royal Navy.
8 February	Steady	Philomel-class gunvessel	Messrs. W. C. Miller & Son	Liverpool	United Kingdom	For Royal Navy.
9 February	Argo	Steamship	Messrs. C. & W. Earle	Hull	United Kingdom	For Messrs. Thomas Wilson, Sons, & Co.
9 February	Harry Herbert	Brigantine	Robert Jones	Rhyl	United Kingdom	For Mr. Davies and others.
13 February	Elizabeth M'Lea	Brig	Messrs. Robert Steele & Son	Cartsdyke	United Kingdom	For Messrs. Kenneth M'Lea & Sons.
14 February	Scorpion	Gunboat	Domcke	Grabow	Grand Duchy of Mecklenburg-Schwerin	For Prussian Navy.
16 February	Latouche-Tréville	Aviso		Toulon	France	For French Navy.
20 February	Glencoe	Smack	Messrs. Scott, M'Gill & Duncan	Bowling	United Kingdom	For Messrs. Mackellar & Mitchell.
22 February	Go Ahead	Schooner		Rothesay	United Kingdom	For Messrs. M'Arthur and others.
22 February	Rifleman	Clipper	William Duthie Jr.	Aberdeen	United Kingdom	For private owner.
22 February	Spanker	Clipper	Messrs. A. M'Millan & Son	Dumbarton	United Kingdom	For private owner.
23 February	Camelion	Camelion-class sloop		Chatham Dockyard	United Kingdom	For Royal Navy.
23 February	Cubana	Barque	William Pile Jr.	Sunderland	United Kingdom	For Ridley & Co.
23 February	Skimmer of the Waves	Barque	William Briggs	Sunderland	United Kingdom	For J. & J. Thompson.
25 February	Griffon	Philomel-class gunvessel		Northfleet	United Kingdom	For Royal Navy.
25 February	Ulster	Paddle steamer	John Laird	Birkenhead	United Kingdom	For City of Dublin Steam Packet Company.
28 February	Hengueist	Full-rigged ship	Messrs. Scott & Co.	Cartsdyke	United Kingdom	For Messrs. Lamperton, Holt & Co.
28 February	Torch	Philomel-class gunvessel		River Thames	United Kingdom	For Royal Navy.
28 February	Dorade	Transport (Clipper)	Gutave Guibert	Bordeaux	France	For French Navy
February	British Standard	Barque	J. Davison	Sunderland	United Kingdom	For Anderson & Co.
February	Leda	Barque	John Robinson	Sunderland	United Kingdom	For J. Clay.
February	Little Edith	Full-rigged ship	T. R. Oswald	Sunderland	United Kingdom	For J. Spence.
6 March	Leinster	Paddle steamer	Messrs. Samuda Bros.	Millwall	United Kingdom	For City of Dublin Steam Packet Company.
7 March	Howe	First rate		Pembroke Dockyard	United Kingdom	For Royal Navy.
8 March	Atlas	Steamship	Messrs. J. & G. Thompson	Govan	United Kingdom	For Messrs. Burns & MacIver.
8 March	Marquis of Argyle	Clipper	Messrs. Walter Hood & Co.	Footdee	United Kingdom	For J. Monro.
8 March	Rifleman	Barque	William Briggs	Sunderland	United Kingdom	For J. Shepherd.
8 March	The Providence	Merchantman	J. Harrison	Beverley	United Kingdom	For J. Moorhouse.
8 March	Vencedora	Barque	Robert Thompson	Sunderland	United Kingdom	For Nicholson & Co.
10 March	Balclutha	Steamship	Messrs Caird & Co.	Greenock	United Kingdom	For Messrs. James Little & Co.
10 March	Barrosa	Jason-class corvette		Woolwich Dockyard	United Kingdom	For Royal Navy.
10 March	Normandie	Gloire-class ironclad	Arsenal de Cherbourg	Cherbourg	France	For French Navy.
10 March	Ocean Skimmer	Barque	W. Ratcliffe	Sunderland	United Kingdom	For Mr. Thompson.
10 March	Otho	Steamship	Messrs. Langley	Deptford	United Kingdom	For Greek Steam Navigation Company.
13 March	Juno	Steamship	Messrs. Tod & MacGregor	Partick	United Kingdom	For Largs & Millport Steamboat Company.
15 March	Masséna	Suffren-class ship of the line	Arsenal de Toulon	Toulon	France	For French Navy.
20 March	Lady Nightingale	Merchantman	Messrs. D. Burns & Co.	Aberdeen	United Kingdom	For Mr. Tulloch.
21 March	Laxey Mines	Schooner	Messrs. Fullarton	Ayr	United Kingdom	For Messrs. John Moore & Co.
23 March	Tetuan	Barque	William Briggs	Sunderland	United Kingdom	For Abarca, Seminario & Plasencia.
24 March	Frederick William	First rate		Portsmouth Dockyard	United Kingdom	For Royal Navy.
24 March	Mavrogordaice	Steamship	Messrs. Leslie	Hebburn	United Kingdom	For Messrs. Charles Mitchell & Co.
26 March	Syrian	Cargo ship	Harland & Wolff	Belfast	United Kingdom	For J. Bibby & Sons.
28 March	Landrail	Philomel-class gunvessel		Deptford Dockyard	United Kingdom	For Royal Navy.
29 March	Volunteer	Full-rigged ship	Tay Shipbuilding Company	Dundee	United Kingdom	For private owner.
31 March	Helix	Steam yacht		Greenock	United Kingdom	For private owner.
March	Ranger	Schooner			United Kingdom	For private owner.
3 April	Margaretta Stevenson	Steam yacht	Messrs. William Denny & Bros.	Dubarton	United Kingdom	For H. C. Stevenson.
5 April	Ibis	Steamship	Cork Steam Ship Company	Cork	United Kingdom	For private owner.
6 April	Falcon	Steamship	Archibald Denny	Dumbarton	United Kingdom	For private owner.
6 April	Jannet Evans	Schooner	Messrs. Pierce and E. Roberts	Port Madoc	United Kingdom	For John Evans.
6 April	Neva	Clipper	Messrs. Adamson & Son	Alloa	United Kingdom	For Mr. Sinclair and others.
7 April	Success	Schooner	Trenery	Gainsborough	United Kingdom	For private owner.
9 April	Lavinia	Schooner	Reed	Ipswich	United Kingdom	For private owner.
10 April	Mona's Isle	Steamship	Tod & MacGregor	Glasgow	United Kingdom	For Isle of Man Steam Packet Co. Ltd.
12 April	Belvidera	Full-rigged ship	W. Briggs	Sunderland	United Kingdom	For Allan & Sons.
14 April	Perseverance	Merchantman	Watson	Banff	United Kingdom	For John Adam.
18 April	Mail	Steamship	Messrs. Tod & MacGregor	Meadowside	United Kingdom	For private owner.
21 April	Byzantion	steamship	J. G. Laurie	Whiteinch	United Kingdom	For Greek Government.
21 April	Connaught	Paddle steamer	Palmers Shipbuilding and Iron Company	Jarrow	United Kingdom	For Atlantic Royal Mail Steam Navigation Co.
21 April	Eldinga	Steamship	Messrs. Scott & Co.	Greenock	United Kingdom	For private owner.
21 April	Ellen Horsfall	Barque	J. Spence	Sunderland	United Kingdom	For Thomas C. Alcock.
21 April	Leinster	Paddle steamer	Messrs. Palmer Bros.	Newcastle upon Tyne	United Kingdom	For Royal Mail Steam Packet Company.
21 April	Munster	Paddle steamer	John Laird	Birkenhead	United Kingdom	For City of Dublin Steam Packet Company.
21 April	Saint Oswin	Barque	Pickersgill & Miller	Sunderland	United Kingdom	For R. Mease.
23 April	Cambrian	Steamship	C. Lungley	Deptford	United Kingdom	For Union Steam Navigation Company.
23 April	The Vine	Steamship	Messrs. Denny & Rankin	Glasgow	United Kingdom	For private owner.
25 April	Earl of Arran	Paddle steamer	Blackwood & Gordon	River Clyde	United Kingdom	For Ardrossan Steamboat Company.
30 April	Kittiwake	Yacht	Inman	Lymington	United Kingdom	For Marquis of Ailsa.
30 April	May Queen	Schooner	Messrs. Evans & Son	Bristol	United Kingdom	For private owner.
April	Belfast	Schooner			(United Kingdom of Great Britain and Ireland) Colony of Prince Edward Island	For private owner.
April	Carron	Steamship	Messrs. Barclay, Curle & Co.	Stobcross	United Kingdom	For Carron Company.
April	Endeavour	Merchantman	Messrs. Hazzlehurst	Beverley	United Kingdom	For Messrs. Dyson, Tindall & Co.
April	Heroine	Brigantine	J. & R. Bailey	Shoreham-by-Sea	United Kingdom	For Thomas Gates.
April	Lara	Yacht		Lymington	United Kingdom	For Marquis of Ailsa.
April	Marquis of Argyle	Clipper	Messrs. Walter Hood & Co.	Aberdeen	United Kingdom	For Aberdeen Clipper Line.
3 May	Guerrière	Dryade-class frigate		Brest	France	For French Navy.
4 May	Raleigh	Full-rigged ship	James Hardie	Sunderland	United Kingdom	For H. Ellis.
5 May	Mermaid	Cutter yacht	Payne	Southampton	United Kingdom	For C. Ricketts.
5 May	Queen Amalia	Steamship	C. Lungley	Deptford	United Kingdom	For Greek Steam Navigation Company.
8 May	Eyo Honesty	Paddle steamer	John Laird	Birkenhead	United Kingdom	For Eyo Honesty II (deceased).
15 May	Gleam	Cutter	Messrs. Spencer & Barnes	Cowes	United Kingdom	For private owner.
15 May	St. Lawrence	Cutter	Ratsey	Cowes	United Kingdom	For Mr. Stephenson.
16 May	Giraffe	Paddle steamer	J. & G. Thompson	Govan	United Kingdom	For J. & G. Burns Line.
16 May	San Enrique	Tug	Messrs. Caird & Co.	Greenock	United Kingdom	For private owner.
16 May	San Joaquim	Tug	Messrs. Caird & Co.	Greenock	United Kingdom	For private owner.
19 May	Imperator Nikolai I	First rate	New Admiralty Shipyard	Saint Petersburg	Russia	For Imperial Russian Navy.
21 May	Windward	Merchantman	James Laing	Sunderland	United Kingdom	For Fenwick & Laroche.
21 May	Ville de Bordeaux	Ville de Nantes-class ship of the line	Arsenal de Lorient	Lorient	France	For French Navy.
22 May	Elizabeth Jane	Brigantine	William Read	Ipswich	United Kingdom	For private owner.
22 May	Malabar	East Indiaman	William Pile Jr.	Sunderland	United Kingdom	For Richard Green.
22 May	May Flower	Brig	D. Burns & Co.	Aberdeen	United Kingdom	For private owner.
24 May	Vistula	Steamship	Messrs. Barclay, Curle & Co.	Stobcross	United Kingdom	For Leith, Hull and Hamburg Steam Packet Company.
25 May	Pacific	Steamship	Messrs. Earle	Hull	United Kingdom	For Messrs. Thomas Wilson & Co.
May	I'll Try	Brig		Aberdeen	United Kingdom	For private owner.
May	Jumna	Steamship	Messrs. Reid & Co.	Port Glasgow	United Kingdom	For Oriental Inland Steam Navigation Company.
May	Maria Teresa	frigate			Kingdom of the Two Sicilies	For Royal Neapolitan Navy.
May	Nagasaki	Full-rigged ship		Quebec	(United Kingdom of Great Britain and Ireland) Province of Canada	For private owner.
May	Prince Arthur	Steamship	Messrs. Smith & Rodger	Govan	United Kingdom	For Leith and London Shipping Company.
May	Silesia	Full-rigged ship		Saint John	(United Kingdom of Great Britain and Ireland) Colony of New Brunswick	For private owner.
2 June	Teawera	Schooner	Messrs. A. Duthie & Co.	Aberdeen	United Kingdom	For Messrs. Graham & Co.
4 June	Espadon	Espadon-class wheeled aviso	Ernest Gouin et Cie.	Nantes	France	For French Navy
5 June	Cambrian	Schooner	Messrs. Parry & Co.	Hirael	United Kingdom	For Messrs. Parry & Co.
6 June	Phoque	Espadon-class wheeled aviso	Ernest Gouin et Cie.	Nantes	France	For French Navy
18 June	Protée	Protée-class wheeled aviso	Ernest Gouin et Cie.	Nantes	France	For French Navy
20 June	Charles H. Marshall	Pilot boat	Henry Steers	New York	United States	For Josiah Johnson Sr., Frederick Nelson and Jonathan Wright.
21 June	Pygmée	Protée-class wheeled aviso	Ernest Gouin et Cie.	Nantes	France	For French Navy
21 June	Helen	Paddle steamer	W. C. Miller	Toxteth	United Kingdom	For Bridgewater Trustees.
21 June	Miranda	Steam yacht	E. J. Harland	Belfast	United Kingdom	For T. Yeats.
23 June	Flower of Essex	Sailing barge	Mr. Colchester	Ipswich	United Kingdom	For private owner. Collided with the schooner Jannet Shennen on being launched. Both vessels sustained minor damage.
23 June	Orpheus	Jason-class corvette		Chatham Dockyard	United Kingdom	For Royal Navy.
23 June	Wonder	Brig	John White	Cowes	United Kingdom	For Cowes Shipping Company.
27 June	Glee Maiden	Brigantine	James Hardie	Southwick	United Kingdom	For Dickson & Co.
29 June	Frances	Barque	William Briggs	Sunderland	United Kingdom	For Robert Hurrell & Co.
29 June	Isabella	Snow	George Bartram	Sunderland	United Kingdom	For Dawson & Co.
29 June	Renown	Barque	James Briggs	Sunderland	United Kingdom	For Thomas Todd.
3 July	Ulster	Steamship	Messrs. Martin Samuelson & Co.	Hull	United Kingdom	For Atlantic Royal Mail Steam Navigation Company, or Lever's Galway Line.
4 July	Castiglione	Suffren-class ship of the line	Arsenal de Toulon	Toulon	France	For French Navy.
4 July	Jane Maria	Humber Keel	Bethell Scan	Beverley	United Kingdom	For private owner.
5 July	Doterel	Britomart-class gunboat	W. C. Miller	Toxteth	United Kingdom	For Royal Navy.
5 July	Heron	Albacore-class gunboat	W. C. Miller	Toxteth	United Kingdom	For Royal Navy.
7 July	Earl Shelbourne	Paddle steamer	Messrs. James Henderson & Son	Renfrew	United Kingdom	For private owner.
7 July	Lady Beatrice	Brig	G. Short	Sunderland	United Kingdom	For Reay & Co.
7 July	Moneta	East Indiaman	Messrs. Charles Hill & Sons	Bristol	United Kingdom	For Joseph Mondel.
16 July	Diadem	Merchantman	John Lister	Sunderland	United Kingdom	For John Lister.
16 July	Dorothy	Barque	J. Barkes	Sunderland	United Kingdom	For Tully & Co.
18 July	Sphinx	Phaëton-class wheeled aviso	Ernest Gouin et Cie.	Nantes	France	For French Navy
19 July	Victory	Full-rigged ship	William Briggs	Sunderland	United Kingdom	For Briggs & Sons.
19 July	Phaëton	Phaëton-class wheeled aviso	Ernest Gouin et Cie.	Nantes	France	For French Navy
19 July	Water Lily	Brig	William Duthie Jr.	Aberdeen	United Kingdom	For Robert Anderson.
21 July	Atlas	Second rate	Chatham Dockyard	Chatham, Kent	United Kingdom	For Royal Navy.
21 July	Lalla Rookh	Steam Yacht	Messrs. Josiah Jones, Quiggin & Co.	Liverpool	United Kingdom	For Pasha of Egypt.
July	Annie Wark	Brigantine		Richibucto	(United Kingdom of Great Britain and Ireland) Colony of New Brunswick	For private owner.
July	Anomia	Full-rigged ship	P. Brunelle & Sons	Quebec	(United Kingdom of Great Britain and Ireland) Province of Canada	For private owner.
July	Countess	Paddle steamer		Cincinnati, Ohio	United States	For William C. Harrison.
July	Excelsior	Barque		Richibucto	(United Kingdom of Great Britain and Ireland) Colony of New Brunswick	For private owner.
July	Francis Carvill	Barque		Saint John	(United Kingdom of Great Britain and Ireland) Colony of New Brunswick	For private owner.
July	J. Titus	Brigantine		Saint John	(United Kingdom of Great Britain and Ireland) Colony of New Brunswick	For private owner.
July	Speedy	Britomart-class gunboat	Lamport	Workington	United Kingdom	For Royal Navy.
1 August	Flying Spur	Clipper	Messrs. Hall	Footdee	United Kingdom	For John Robertson & Co.
1 August	Archimède	Espadon-class wheeled aviso	Ernest Gouin et Cie.	Nantes	France	For French Navy
2 August	John P. Jackson	Paddle steamer	Devine Burtis	Brooklyn, New York	United States	For New Jersey Rail Road and Transportation Company.
3 August	Lothian	Snow	Bowman and Drummond	Blyth	United Kingdom	For Watts, Milburn & Co.
4 August	Camäleon	Camäleon-class gunboat	Königliche Werft	Danzig	Prussia	For Prussian Navy.
16 August	Cerealia	Barque	John Lister	Sunderland	United Kingdom	For Lister & Co.
16 August	Gibraltar	Duncan-class ship of the line		Devonport Dockyard	United Kingdom	For Royal Navy.
17 August	Halls	Schooner	Robert Thompson	Sunderland	United Kingdom	For M. Halls.
17 August	Kedar	Steamship	Messrs. William Denny & Bros.	Dumbarton	United Kingdom	For Messrs. Burns.
18 August	Chepica	Full-rigged ship	Messrs. Hall	Aberdeen	United Kingdom	For private owner.
18 August	Orestes	Jason-class corvette		Sheerness Dockyard	United Kingdom	For Royal Navy.
18 August	Pallas	Frigate		Lorient	France	For French Navy.
20 August	Alfred Stonard	Brig	Schollick	Ulverston	United Kingdom	For private owner.
20 August	Mary Jane	Schooner	W. Ashburner	Hindpool	United Kingdom	For William Tell.
20 August	Thetis	Full-rigged ship	Messrs. Clover & Royle	Woodside	United Kingdom	For private owner.
28 August	Munster	Steamship	Messrs. Samuelson	Hull	United Kingdom	For Atlantic Royal Mail Company.
30 August	Hudsons	Brig	Peter Austin	Sunderland	United Kingdom	For John Elliott.
30 August	Thule	Steam yacht	Messrs. Tod & MacGregor	Partick	United Kingdom	For James Anderson.
31 August	Kurrachee	Full-rigged ship	Messrs. A. M'Millan & Son	Dumbarton	United Kingdom	For John Kerr.
August	Alice	Snow	Pickersgill & Miller	Sunderland	United Kingdom	For Harper & Co.
August	Condor	Brig	James Robinson	Sunderland	United Kingdom	For W. Dawson.
August	Great Australia	Full-rigged ship	Messrs. Stewart & Co.	Saint John	(United Kingdom of Great Britain and Ireland) Colony of New Brunswick	For Black Ball Line.
August	Kembla	Paddle steamer	Messrs. John Read & Co.	Port Glasgow	United Kingdom	For private owner.
August	Maggie	Brig			(United Kingdom of Great Britain and Ireland) Colony of Prince Edward Island	For private owner.
1 September	Comet	Camäleon-class gunboat	Königliche Werft	Danzig	Prussia	For Prussian Navy.
1 September	Jane Porter	Full-rigged ship	E. J. Harland	Belfast	United Kingdom	For Messrs. J. P. Corry & Co.
1 September	Leinster	Steamship	Messrs. Palmer & Co.	Jarrow	United Kingdom	For private owner.
1 September	Sarah and Emma	East Indiaman	Messrs. Thomas Vernon & Son	Liverpool	United Kingdom	For Messrs. Farnworth & Jardine.
1 September	Superb	Barque	William Doxford	Sunderland	United Kingdom	For Mr. Davison.
3 September	Economist	Steamship	Archibald Denny	Dumbarton	United Kingdom	For private owner.
3 September	Savanette	Barque	Adamson	Alloa	United Kingdom	For Messrs. Gregor, Turnbull & Co.
3 September	No. 12	Pilot schooner	Messrs. Harvey & Son	Ipswich	United Kingdom	For Liverpool Pilots.
4 September	Hydamak	Corvette	Henry S. Pitcher	Northfleet	United Kingdom	For Imperial Russian Nay.
5 September	Egidia	Full-rigged ship	Messrs. Barr & Shearer	Ardrossan	United Kingdom	For Messrs. Potter, Wilson & Co.
6 September	John P King	Paddle steamer	Lupton & McDermut	New York	United States	For private owner.
8 September	Cyclop	Camäleon-class gunboat	Königliche Werft	Danzig	Prussia	For Prussian Navy.
14 September	Eleanor	Brig		Workington	United Kingdom	For private owner. Collided with the schooner Haba on being launched.
15 September	Anson	Renown-class ship of the line		Woolwich Dockyard	United Kingdom	For Royal Navy.
15 September	Delphin	Camäleon-class gunboat	Königliche Werft	Danzig	Prussia	For Prussian Navy.
15 September	Nimble	Philomel-class gunvessel		Pembroke Dockyard	United Kingdom	For Royal Navy.
17 September	Euphemia	Schooner	Messrs. John Scott & Sons	Greenock	United Kingdom	For James Morrison.
17 September	Melbourne	Full-rigged ship	Messrs. Menzies & Co.	Granton	United Kingdom	For D. R. Macgregor.
17 September	Orange Blossom	Merchantman	Messrs. Bayley & Co.	Ipswich	United Kingdom	For Messrs. Pope & Co.
17 September	Robert Mackenzie	East Indiaman	Messrs. William Simons & Co.	Glasgow	United Kingdom	For private owner.
18 September	Eclipse	Cormorant-class gunvessel	J. Scott Russell & Co.	Millwall	United Kingdom	For Royal Navy.
18 September	Perseverance	Fishing smack	Smyth & Scallan	Ringsend	United Kingdom	For private owner.
18 September	United States	Steamship	Messrs. Tod & MacGregor	Partivk	United Kingdom	For Anchor Line.
20 September	Admiral Moorsom	Paddle steamer	Barclay, Curle & Co.	Whiteinch	United Kingdom	For London and North Western Railway.
20 September	Italia	Steamship	Messrs. Scott & Co.	Greenock	United Kingdom	For Mediterranean Steam Shipping Company.
20 September	Jane Cochrane	Schooner		Rothesay	United Kingdom	For John Cochrane and others.
25 September	Ballymurtagh	Steam wherry	Harland & Wolff	Belfast	United Kingdom	For Wicklow Mining Company.
26 September	Pantaloon	Racer-class sloop		Devonport Dockyard	United Kingdom	For Royal Navy.
30 September	Doris	Yacht	Messrs. White	Cowes	United Kingdom	For F. B. Windsor.
30 September	Sentinel	Steamship	Messrs. Palmer Bros.	Howdon	United Kingdom	For Messrs. Laing & Stephens.
September	Charlotte Elizabeth	Brigantine		Holyhead	United Kingdom	For private owner.
September	Hugh Miller	Merchantman		Peterhead	United Kingdom	For private owner.
September	Jaqurabe	Paddle steamer	Messrs. Reid & Co.	Port Glasgow	United Kingdom	For private owner.
September	John	Barque	Robert Thompson Jr,	Sunderland	United Kingdom	For Tully & Son.
September	Lady Egidia	Full-rigged ship		Ardrossan	United Kingdom	For private owner.
September	Zetus	Barque	Pace, Blumer & Co	Sunderland	United Kingdom	For William Milburn.
September	Zingra	Barque	J. & R. Bailey	Shoreham-by-Sea	United Kingdom	For private owner.
2 October	Cyprian Queen	Brig	James M'Millan	Bay of Quick	United Kingdom	For Robert Walker.
2 October	Mooltan	Steamship	Thames Ironworks and Shipbuilding Company	Blackwall	United Kingdom	For Peninsular and Oriental Steam Navigation Company.
5 October	Bathville	Steamship	Robert Alexander	Cuilhill	United Kingdom	For John Watson.
6 October	Rangoon	Merchantman	Messrs. Palmer Bros.	Jarrow	United Kingdom	For private owner.
12 October	Bocciocchi	Steamship	Messrs. Caird & Co., or Messrs. Scott & Co.	Greenock	United Kingdom	For private owner.
15 October	Circé	Frigate		Rochefort	France	For French Navy.
15 October	Gitana	Brig	William Westacott	Barnstaple	United Kingdom	For Messrs. Cory.
15 October	Lealtad	Lealtad-class screw frigate	Reales Astilleros de Esteiro	Ferrol	Spain	For Spanish Navy.
16 October	Newcastle	Bristol-class frigate		Deptford Dockyard	United Kingdom	For Royal Navy.
16 October	Royal Sovereign	Barque	William Briggs	Sunderland	United Kingdom	For Mr. Collingwood.
17 October	Rosario	Rosario-class sloop		Deptford Dockyard	United Kingdom	For Royal Navy.
18 October	Albion	Paddle steamer	Messrs. Tod & MacGregor	Glasgow	United Kingdom	For Stranraer Steamboat Company.
18 October	City of Shanghai	Clipper	Messrs. Barclay, Curle & Co.	Stobcross	United Kingdom	For Messrs. G. Smith & Sons.
18 October	Mystery	Brig	John White	Cowes	United Kingdom	For Cowes Shipping Company.
23 October	Kong Sverre	Frigate			Norway	For Royal Norwegian Navy.
27 October	Deptford	Steamship	builder	Sunderland	United Kingdom	For W. Gray.
27 October	Minatitlan	Brig	Messrs. A. M'Millan & Sons	Dumbarton	United Kingdom	For Messrs. James Graham & Co.
29 October	Contest	Brig		Wilmot	(United Kingdom of Great Britain and Ireland) Colony of Nova Scotia	For private owner.
30 October	Liverpool	Liffey-class frigate		Devonport Dockyard	United Kingdom	For Royal Navy.
30 October	Phillis	Schooner	Thomas Smith	Preston	United Kingdom	For Thomas Smith and Christopher Yates.
31 October	Djambi	Djambi-class corvette	Rijkswerf	Amsterdam	Netherlands	For Royal Netherlands Navy.
31 October	Isaac Webb	Pilot boat	Webb & Bell	Greenpoint, New York	United States	For New York Pilots.
Unknown date	Arabella	Schooner	William Bonker	Salcombe	United Kingdom	For William Shepherd and others.
October	Diomantina	Paddle steamer	Messrs. Charles Mitchell & Co.	Newcastle upon Tyne	United Kingdom	For Australian Steam Navigation Company.
October	Jane Anwyl	Schooner	Watkin Anwyl	Penmaenpool	United Kingdom	For Watkin Anwyl.
October	Liberator	Clipper	Messrs. Duthie	Aberdeen	United Kingdom	For Black Ball Line.
October	Maria Adelaide	Man-of-war		Genoa	Kingdom of Sardinia	For Royal Sardinian Navy.
October	Serpent	Cormorant-class gunvessel	Messrs. Mare	Millwall	United Kingdom	For Royal Navy.
3 November	Duca di Genova	Frigate		Genoa	Kingdom of Sardinia	For Royal Sardinian Navy.
10 November	Corredora	Barque	George Bartram	Hylton	United Kingdom	For Nicholson & Co.
10 November	Eleanor	Brig	Messrs. Beeching	Great Yarmouth	United Kingdom	For private owner.
10 November	Peterel	Rosario-class sloop		Devonport Dockyard	United Kingdom	For Royal Navy.
13 November	Harvest Maid	Schooner	James Bannister	Tarleton	United Kingdom	For Ashcroft, Forshaw, Hull & Taylor.
13 November	Zebra	Camelion-class sloop		Deptford Dockyard	United Kingdom	For Royal Navy.
14 November	Theodore	Merchantman	W. Adamson	Sunderland	United Kingdom	For W. Adamson.
16 November	2nd of December	Gunboat	Messrs. Smith	North Shields	United Kingdom	For Saint-Domingue Navy.
16 November	Zebra	Camelion-class sloop		Deptford Dockyard	United Kingdom	For Royal Navy.
17 November	Thomas Freeborn	Tug	Lawrench & Foulks	Williamsburg, New York	United States	For private owner.
20 November	Jylland	Frigate	Orlogsværftet	Copenhagen	Denmark	For Royal Danish Navy.
20 November	Thames	Steamship	Messrs. Barclay, Curle & Co.	Stobcross	United Kingdom	For Carron Company.
29 November	Rapid	Rosario-class sloop		Deptford Dockyard	United Kingdom	For Royal Navy.
November	Argus	Aviso		Saint-Cloud	France	For French Navy.
November	Brilliant	Full-rigged ship	Samuel Hall	East Boston, Massachusetts	United States	For Messrs. J. Atkins & Co. and Mr. Hagar.
November	Lady Franklin	Paddle steamer	Coppin	Londonderry	United Kingdom	For private owner.
November	Silver Stream	Barque	D. A. Douglas	Southwick	United Kingdom	For W. Porter.
1 December	Leading Star	Fishing smack	Messrs. Hallett	Hull	United Kingdom	For T. Halfyard.
8 December	Roi Jerome	Steamship	Messrs. Scott & Co.	Greenock	United Kingdom	For private owner.
15 December	Amalia	Frigate	Henry S. Pitcher	Northfleet	United Kingdom	For Royal Hellenic Navy.
17 December	Margaret and Agnes	Fishing smack	John Gibson	Fleetwood	United Kingdom	For Messrs. Copeland & Parkinson.
27 December	Sir Charles Wood	Steamship	Messrs. Richardson & Duck	Stockton-on-Tees	United Kingdom	For private owner.
29 December	Warrior	Warrior-class ironclad	Thames Ironworks and Shipbuilding Co. Ltd	Leamouth	United Kingdom	For Royal Navy.
December	Curieux	Gunboat		Honfleur	France	For French Navy.
December	Fiery Cross	Clipper		Liverpool	United Kingdom	For John Campbell.
December	Harriet Dobing	Brig	Green & Richardson	Sunderland	United Kingdom	For Dobing & Co.
December	Western Belle	Clipper		Bath, Maine	United States	For private owner.
Spring	Ensign	Brig	Cochar	Montrose	United Kingdom	For private owner.
Spring	Glenora	Barque		Quebec	(United Kingdom of Great Britain and Ireland) Province of Canada	For private owner.
Unknown date	Adolph Hugel	Schooner		Philadelphia, Pennsylvania	United States	For private owner.
Unknown date	Alfred Hawley	Barque	William Pile Jr.	Sunderland	United Kingdom	For T. B. Walker & Co.
Unknown date	Alfred Robb	Paddle steamer		Pittsburgh, Pennsylvania	United States	For private owner.
Unknown date	Allendale	Merchantman	Austin & Mills	Sunderland	United Kingdom	For Wilson Bros.
Unknown date	Amalthea	Merchantman	Todd & Brown	Sunderland	United Kingdom	For M. Thompson.
Unknown date	Amanda	Frigate		River Thames	United Kingdom	For Royal Hellenic Navy.
Unknown date	Anna Sarah	Merchantman	S. Metcalf	Sunderland	United Kingdom	For Mr. Goddard.
Unknown date	Ann Brass	Schooner	W. Thackeray	Sunderland	United Kingdom	For C. Clark.
Unknown date	Annie Archball	Full-rigged ship	George Peverall	Sunderland	United Kingdom	For Brodie & Co.
Unknown date	Antonio Vinent	Merchantman	D. A. Douglas	Sunderland	United Kingdom	For Richards & Co.
Unknown date	Arletta	Schooner		Mystic, Connecticut	United States	For private owner.
Unknown date	Artemisia	Merchantman	J. Haswell	Sunderland	United Kingdom	For A. Tindall.
Unknown date	Baltic	Paddle steamer		Philadelphia, Pennsylvania	United States	For Southern Steamship Co.
Unknown date	Baronsmore	Full-rigged ship	T. R. Oswald	Monkwearmouth	United Kingdom	For Thomas Sinclair.
Unknown date	Beatrice	Schooner		Newhaven	United Kingdom	For private owner.
Unknown date	Beta	Merchantman	B. Hodgson	Sunderland	United Kingdom	For E. Perkins.
Unknown date	Bienville	Paddle steamer		Brooklyn, New York	United States	For private owner
Unknown date	Bothnia	Steamship	Messrs. William Earle	Hull	United Kingdom	For Messrs. Wilson.
Unknown date	Cambridge	Steamship	Paul Curtis	Medford, Massachusetts	United States	For private owner
Unknown date	Coila	Schooner	James Hardie	Sunderland	United Kingdom	For Mr. Dickson.
Unknown date	Corea	Merchantman	T. H. Wood	Sunderland	United Kingdom	For Woods & Co.
Unknown date	Connaught	Paddle steamer	Messrs. Samuda Brothers or Messrs. Laird Bros.	Cubitt Town or Birkenhead	United Kingdom	For City of Dublin Steam Packet Company.
Unknown date	Cotherstone	Barque	Austin & Mills	Sunderland	United Kingdom	For Wilson Bros.
Unknown date	Cotton Plant	Steamship		Philadelphia, Pennsylvania	United States	For private owner.
Unknown date	Cypress	Merchantman	Peter Austin	Sunderland	United Kingdom	For Wilson Bros.
Unknown date	Day Star	Merchantman	Green & Richardson	Sunderland	United Kingdom	For Mr. Goddard.
Unknown date	Denbigh	Paddle steamer	John Laird, Son, & Co.	Birkenhead	United Kingdom	For Robert Gardner.
Unknown date	De Soto	Paddle steamer		New Albany, Indiana	United States	For private owner.
Unknown date	Dinorah	Barque	James Robinson	Sunderland	United Kingdom	For James Dryden & Co.
Unknown date	Donegal	Paddle steamer		Wilmington, Delaware	United States	For private owner.
Unknown date	Dunloe	Merchantman	J. Davison	Sunderland	United Kingdom	For Mr. Atkinson.
Unknown date	Earl Talbot	Paddle steamer	Messrs. James Henderson & Son	Renfrew	United Kingdom	For private owner.
Unknown date	E. D. Fogg	Tugboat		Providence, Rhode Island	United States	For private owner.
Unknown date	Edger	Merchantman	N. Stothard	Sunderland	United Kingdom	For Horsley & Co.
Unknown date	Elizabeth	Sloop	T. Robson	Sunderland	United Kingdom	For private owner.
Unknown date	Elizabeth Dawson	Merchantman	James Robinson	Sunderland	United Kingdom	For W. Dawson.
Unknown date	Elizabeth Hargrove	Barque	T. R. Oswald	Pallion	United Kingdom	For Hargrove & Co.
Unknown date	Ella Gladstone	Brig	John Blumer	Sunderland	United Kingdom	For Mr. Gladstone.
Unknown date	Ellen	Merchantman	J. Denniston	Sunderland	United Kingdom	For Mr. Rankin.
Unknown date	Ellis	Steamship	Harlan & Hollingsworth	Wilmington, Delaware	United States	For private owner.
Unknown date	Era No. 5	Sternwheeler		Pittsburgh, Pennsylvania	United States	For private owner.
Unknown date	Emma Duncan	Steamship		Monongahela, Pennsylvania	United States	For private owner.
Unknown date	Fannie	Pilot boat	Edward F. Williams	Greenpoint, New York	United States	For Edward Mersenee.
Unknown date	Forth	Merchantman	James Pile	Sunderland	United Kingdom	For J. Devereux.
Unknown date	Fria	Merchantman	W. Pickersgill	Sunderland	United Kingdom	For Mr. Hudson.
Unknown date	Fuschia	Merchantman	L. Wheatley	Sunderland	United Kingdom	For Mr. McKenzie.
Unknown date	Fusilier	Merchantman	James Laing	Sunderland	United Kingdom	For E. C. Friend & Co.
Unknown date	Gem	Merchantman	J. Duncan	Sunderland	United Kingdom	For Duncan & Co.
Unknown date	General Admiral	Paddle steamer	Messrs. William Earle	Hull	United Kingdom	For private owner.
Unknown date	George Stephenson	Brig	J. & J. Brown	Sunderland	United Kingdom	For J. & J. White.
Unknown date	Glengarnoch	Barque		Quebec	(United Kingdom of Great Britain and Ireland) Province of Canada	For private owner.
Unknown date	Gulnare	Merchantman	T. Stonehouse	Sunderland	United Kingdom	For Donkin & Co.
Unknown date	Hebe	Barque	John Denniston	Sunderland	United Kingdom	For Thomas White.
Unknown date	Henry Von Phul	Paddle steamer		Paducah, Kentucky	United States	For private owner.
Unknown date	Heron	Barque	R. H. Potts & Bros.	Sunderland	United Kingdom	For John Elliott.
Unknown date	Heron	Steamship	Messrs. William Denny & Bros.	Dumbarton	United Kingdom	For Burns Line.
Unknown date	Hetty Ellen	Merchantman	Mr. Bevans	Llanelly	United Kingdom	For James Davies.
Unknown date	Impetus	Merchantman	James Laing	Sunderland	United Kingdom	For private owner.
Unknown date	I. N. Seymour	Paddle tug	Benjamin C. Terry	Keyport, New Jersey	United States	For private owner.
Unknown date	Isabella	Merchantman	J. & J. Robinson	Sunderland	United Kingdom	For Teight & Co.
Unknown date	Jane Duncan	Snow	Edward Potts	Seaham	United Kingdom	For Tully & Son.
Unknown date	Jawera	Clipper	Messrs. Duthie	Aberdeen	United Kingdom	For Passengers' Line of Packets.
Unknown date	John and Ann	Merchantman		Sunderland	United Kingdom	For private owner.
Unknown date	John Bull	Barque	T. R. Oswald	Sunderland	United Kingdom	For Temperley & Co.
Unknown date	Junaluska	Tug		Philadelphia, Pennsylvania	United States	For private owner.
Unknown date	Kalmia	Merchantman	John T. Alcock	Sunderland	United Kingdom	For J. Alcock.
Unknown date	Knight Bruce	Clipper			United Kingdom	For private owner.
Unknown date	Kong Sverre	Frigate	Kaljohansværns Værft	Horten	Norway	For Royal Norwegian Navy.
Unknown date	Lady Franklin	Merchantman	J. H. Watson	Sunderland	United Kingdom	For George Watson.
Unknown date	Lemnos	Brig	W. Adamson	Sunderland	United Kingdom	For Mears & Co.
Unknown date	Linden	Paddle steamer		Belle Vernon, Pennsylvania	United States	For private owner.
Unknown date	Linnet	Britomart-class gunboat	W. Briggs	Sunderland	United Kingdom	For Royal Navy.
Unknown date	Lord Macaulay	Merchantman	G. W. Hall	Sunderland	United Kingdom	For Munro & Co.
Unknown date	Louisiana	Steamship	Harlan & Hollingsworth	Wilmington, Delaware	United States	For S. & J. M. Flanagan.
Unknown date	Madeline	Barque	Peter Austin	Sunderland	United Kingdom	For W. Ord & Co.
Unknown date	Marengo	Merchantman	J. Haswell	Sunderland	United Kingdom	For A. Tindall.
Unknown date	Mary & Isabella	Brig	Rawson & Watson	Sunderland	United Kingdom	For Walton & Co.
Unknown date	Massachusetts	Steamship		Boston, Massachusetts	United States	For Boston & Southern Steamship Co.
Unknown date	Massalia	Paddle steamer	Samuda Bros.	Cubitt Town	United Kingdom	For Peninsular and Oriental Steam Navigation Company.
Unknown date	Maurge	Gunboat		Le Havre	France	For Imperial Russian Navy.
Unknown date	Morning Star	Brig	Benjain Hodgson	Sunderland	United Kingdom	For Richard Humble.
Unknown date	Negress	Merchantman	G. Peverall	Sunderland	United Kingdom	For Lucas Bros.
Unknown date	Nelly	Merchantman	Todd & Brown	Sunderland	United Kingdom	For I. Brooks.
Unknown date	Nereid	Merchantman	J. Denniston	Sunderland	United Kingdom	For Wynn & Co.
Unknown date	Nora	Merchantman	Robert Thompson	Sunderland	United Kingdom	For Mr. Williamson.
Unknown date	Nuestra Señora del Regla	Paddle steamer		New York	United States	For private owner.
Unknown date	Ocean Wave	Scow		Michigan	United States	For private owner.
Unknown date	Olivia	Merchantman	T. H. Wood	Sunderland	United Kingdom	For Woods & Co.
Unknown date	Onward	Smack	James Pile	Sunderland	United Kingdom	For John Galley.
Unknown date	Orizava	Merchantman	T. R. Oswald	Sunderland	United Kingdom	For Hargrove & Co.
Unknown date	Phasma	Cutter	Ratsey	Cowes	United Kingdom	For private owner.
Unknown date	Pigeon	Britomart-class gunboat	W. Briggs	Sunderland	United Kingdom	For Royal Navy.
Unknown date	Planter	Paddle steamer		Charleston, South Carolina	United States	For private owner
Unknown date	Prince Llewellyn	Schooner	Mr. Barlow	Caernarfon	United Kingdom	For Edward Williams.
Unknown date	Quanita	Brig	John Anderton	Runcorn	United Kingdom	For private owner.
Unknown date	Queen	Steamship			United States	For private owner.
Unknown date	Queen of India	Clipper		Saint John's	(United Kingdom of Great Britain and Ireland) Colony of Newfoundland	For private owner.
Unknown date	Queen of the Ocean	Merchantman	William Pile Jr.	Sunderland	United Kingdom	For S. Mease.
Unknown date	Ratcliff	Merchantman	W. Barclay	Sunderland	United Kingdom	For Sergeant & Co.
Unknown date	Ready Rhino	Merchantman	G. W. Hall	Sunderland	United Kingdom	For Thomas & Co.
Unknown date	Reliance	Steamboat		Keyport, New Jersey	United States	For private owner.
Unknown date	Resolute	Tug		Keyport, New Jersey	United States	For private owner.
Unknown date	Resolution	Merchantman	Talbot, or Sykes & Co	Sunderland	United Kingdom	For Tully & Co.
Unknown date	Retreiver	Merchantman	T. Wymark	Sunderland	United Kingdom	For T. Wymark.
Unknown date	Roecliff	Schooner	W. Adamson	Sunderland	United Kingdom	For W. Adamson.
Unknown date	Royal Visitor	Clipper		Quebec	(United Kingdom of Great Britain and Ireland) Province of Canada	For Houlder Line.
Unknown date	R. R. Cuyler	Steamship	Samuel Sneeden	New York	United States	For H. B. Cromwell & Co.
Unknown date	Ryhope	Merchantman	James Laing	Sunderland	United Kingdom	For Hugh Taylor & Co.
Unknown date	Sallie Wood	Paddle steamer		Paducah, Kentucky	United States	For private owner.
Unknown date	Salvia	Merchantman	Naizby	Sunderland	United Kingdom	For H. Ellis.
Unknown date	Samson	Paddle steamer		California, Pennsylvania	United States	For private owner.
Unknown date	Sea Mew	Merchantman	James Laing	Sunderland	United Kingdom	For Dublin Pilot Board.
Unknown date	Severn	Brig	John Blumer	Sunderland	United Kingdom	For Mr. Wrightson.
Unknown date	Sharpshooter	Merchantman	T. R. Oswald	Sunderland	United Kingdom	For Beazley & Co.
Unknown date	Silome	Barque	Naizby	Sunderland	United Kingdom	For J. Clay.
Unknown date	Southampton	Steamship	Messrs. Palmer & Co.	Newcastle upon Tyne	United Kingdom	For South Western Steam Navigation Company.
Unknown date	South Carolina	Steamboat		Boston, Massachusetts	United States	For private owner.
Unknown date	Statesman	Barque	J. & J. Robinson	Sunderland	United Kingdom	For Jobling & Co.
Unknown date	Sundew	Schooner	J. Barkes	Sunderland	United Kingdom	For Watson & Co.
Unknown date	Test	Schooner	Mr. Seymour	Sunderland	United Kingdom	For W. R. Sharland.
Unknown date	The Cedars	Merchantman	J. Briggs	Sunderland	United Kingdom	For Hudson & Co.
Unknown date	Toey-Wan	Steamship			China	For private owner.
Unknown date	Tom Sugg	Paddle steamer		Cincinnati, Ohio	United States	For private owner.
Unknown date	Terror	Steamship	Messrs. Palmer	Jarrow	United Kingdom	For private owner.
Unknown date	Thomas Aylan	Schooner	Joseph & Nicholas Butson	Bodinnick or Polruan	United Kingdom	For John Salt and others.
Unknown date	Undine	Merchantman	Rawson & Watson	Sunderland	United Kingdom	For Gallon & Co.
Unknown date	Vedra	Steamship	T. R. Oswald	Sunderland	United Kingdom	For Messrs. Stobart & Co.
Unknown date	Vigilant	Tug	G. Craggs	Sunderland	United Kingdom	For Craggs & Co.
Unknown date	Violet	Merchantman	John T. Alcock	Sunderland	United Kingdom	For J. Alcock.
Unknown date	Vyne	Merchantman	W. Adamson	Sunderland	United Kingdom	For private owner.
Unknown date	Wayfarer	Full-rigged ship	N. Cox	Roodee	United Kingdom	For private owner.
Unknown date	Weymouth	Schooner	Samuel Gaskill	Mays Landing, New Jersey	United States	For private owner.
Unknown date	William G. Hewes	Steamship	Harlan and Hollingsworth	Wilmington, Delaware	United States	For Southern Steamship Co.
Unknown date	Yankee	Paddle tug		New York City, New York	United States	For private owner
Unknown date	Zehlima	Barque	Robert Thompson Jr.	Sunderland	United Kingdom	For Moon & Co.
Unknown date	Zeus	Merchantman	William Pile	Sunderland	United Kingdom	For George Leslie.
Unknown date	Unnamed	Hopper barge	A. Simey	Sunderland	United Kingdom	For private owner.
Unknown date	Unnamed	Hopper barge	A. Simey	Sunderland	United Kingdom	For private owner.
