= List of shipwrecks in October 1866 =

The following ships were sunk, foundered, grounded, or otherwise lost during October 1866.

== 1 October ==
List of shipwrecks: 1 October 1866
Ship	State	Description
Alert	United Kingdom	The ship was driven ashore at Holyhead, Anglesey. She was on a voyage from Liverpool, Lancashire to Jersey, Channel Islands. She was refloated and taken in to Holyhead.
Ambrosine	United States	The ship sank in the Atlantic Ocean with the loss of ten of her fifteen crew. Survivors were rescued the next day by the steamship Newburn (United States). Ambrosine was on a voyage from Pensacola, Florida to Queenstown, County Cork, United Kingdom.
General Clinch	United States	The tugboat was driven ashore and wrecked in a hurricane at Nassau, Bahamas
HMS Nimble	Royal Navy	The Philomel-class gunvessel was driven ashore in a hurricane at Nassau.
Unnamed	(United Kingdom of Great Britain and Ireland) Bahamas	The schooner was driven into by the tug General Clint (United States) in a hurricane at Nassau and was wrecked.
Unnamed	United Kingdom	The brig was run down and sunk by a steamship off Flamborough Head, Yorkshire. Her crew were rescued by the steamship.

== 2 October ==
List of shipwrecks: 2 October 1866
Ship	State	Description
Adona	United Kingdom	The schooner ran aground on the Dragor Sand, in the Baltic Sea. She was on a voyage from Saint Petersburg, Russia to Boston, Lincolnshire.
Ambrosine	United Kingdom	The ship foundered in the Atlantic Ocean off the coast of Florida, United States. She was on a voyage from Cardiff, Glamorgan to Veracruz, Mexico.
HMS Griffon	Royal Navy	The Philomel-class gunvessel collided with HMS Pandora (Royal Navy) and sank off Little Popo, Africa. Her crew were rescued.
James Daly	(United Kingdom of Great Britain and Ireland) New Zealand	The schooner was wrecked at Waikawa in the Catlins with the loss of all her crew.
Lord Elgin	Norway	The ship ran aground on the Matanilla Reef, in the Bahamas and was wrecked. She was on a voyage from Pensacola, Florida, United States to Greenock, Renfrewshire, United Kingdom.
Offor	United Kingdom	The ship was wrecked on the English Bank, in the River Plate. Her crew were rescued.
Superb	United Kingdom	The ship was wrecked on a reef off Bimini, Bahamas. She was on a voyage from Pensacola to Liverpool, Lancashire.

== 3 October ==
List of shipwrecks: 3 October 1866
Ship	State	Description
Carolina	Trieste	The ship was driven ashore near Blakeney, Norfolk, United Kingdom. She was on a voyage from North Shields, Northumberland, United Kingdom to Cette, Hérault, Franc and Trieste. She was refloated and assisted in to Grimsby, Lincolnshire in a severely leaky condition.
Emma	United Kingdom	The ship ran aground on the Alligator Reef. She was on a voyage from Minatitlán, Mexico to Cardiff, Glamorgan.
Evening Star	United States	The paddle steamer foundered in a hurricane 180 nautical miles (330 km) off Tybee Island, Georgia with the loss of 261 lives There were seventeen survivors. She was on a voyage from New York to New Orleans, Louisiana.
Goshawk	United Kingdom	The ship ran aground on the Vergen Rock, off Hogland, Russia. She was on a voyage from Kronstadt, Russia to a British port. She was refloated and taken in to Moshchny Island, Russia in a waterlogged condition. She sank on 8 October.
Island Home	United States	The schooner capsized. Her crew were rescued.
Undine	United Kingdom	The steam yacht ran aground at Burghead, Moray. She was refloated.

== 4 October ==
List of shipwrecks: 4 October 1866
Ship	State	Description
Arcola	United States	The schooner was drove ashore at Port Hood, Nova Scotia and became a total loss. Crew saved.
Consul	United Kingdom	The ship was abandoned in the Atlantic Ocean. Her 21 crew took to a boat; they were rescued the next day by the brig Adien (Prussia). Consul was on a voyage from the Cape Verde Islands to Savannah, Georgia, United States.
Eudora	United Kingdom	The barque was wrecked on St. Paul Island, Nova Scotia, British North America. Her crew were rescued. She was on a voyage from Ardrossan, Ayrshire to Quebec City, Province of Canada, British North America.
John and Mary	United Kingdom	The ship foundered in the North Sea. Her crew were rescued by Loyal Standard (United Kingdom). John and Mary was on a voyage from Sunderland, County Durham to Hamburg.
Queen Victoria	(United Kingdom of Great Britain and Ireland) British North America	The steamship foundered in the Atlantic Ocean (33°03′N 76°30′W) with the loss of two of her crew. Survivors were rescued by the brig Ponvert (United States). Queen Victoria was on a voyage from Quebec City, Province of Canada to Havana, Cuba.
Samuel Tarbox	United States	The ship foundered in the Atlantic Ocean with the loss of five of her fifteen crew. She was on a voyage from Baltimore, Maryland to Aspinwall, United States of Colombia.
Westminster	United Kingdom	The ship was wrecked on the Prata Shoal. Her crew survived. She was on a voyage from Shanghai, China to London.
Unnamed	United Kingdom	The schooner was run into and sank in the River Mersey by the steamship Carroll (United Kingdom). Her crew were rescued by Carroll.

== 5 October ==
List of shipwrecks: 5 October 1866
Ship	State	Description
Commerce	Norway	The brig was driven ashore in Robin Hoods Bay. She was on a voyage from Christiania to Middlesbrough, Yorkshire, United Kingdom. She was refloated by Kate (United Kingdom) and towed in to Scarborough, Yorkshire. She was deemed to be beyond economic repair.
Gerent	United Kingdom	The ship was driven ashore at Bondicar, Northumberland. She was refloated and towed in to Warkworth, Northumberland.

== 6 October ==
List of shipwrecks: 6 October 1866
Ship	State	Description
Alexander	United Kingdom	The ship was destroyed by fire in the North Sea. She was on a voyage from Newcastle upon Tyne, Northumberland to Rio de Janeiro, Brazil.
Anna Maria	United Kingdom	The schooner was run down and sunk at Sunderland, County Durham by the steamship Hawthorns (United Kingdom).
Antelope	United States	The whaler, a barque, was driven ashore and wrecked at "Nitatalik Harbour", Greenland. Her crew were rescued by the steamship Tay (United Kingdom).
City of Brussels	United Kingdom	The schooner departed from Sunderland for Stralsund. No further trace, presumed foundered with the loss of all hands.
Istria	United Kingdom	The ship was abandoned in a sinking condition. Her crew were rescued. She was on a voyage from Buenos Aires, Argentina to Liverpool, Lancashire.
Stockport	United Kingdom	The paddle steamer ran aground at Cuxhaven. She was on a voyage from Grimsby, Lincolnshire to Hamburg.

== 7 October ==
List of shipwrecks: 7 October 1866
Ship	State	Description
Dauntless	United Kingdom	The brig sprang a leak and sank in the North Sea 9 nautical miles (17 km) off Scarborough, Yorkshire. Her crew survived. She was on a voyage from Hartlepool, County Durham to King's Lynn, Norfolk.

== 8 October ==
List of shipwrecks: 8 October 1866
Ship	State	Description
Carolina	Sweden	The schooner was run into by the steamship Marie (United Kingdom) and sank in the Baltic Sea. Her crew were rescued by Marie.
John and Henry	United Kingdom	The brig was abandoned in the North Sea. Her crew were rescued.
Mary Wighton	United Kingdom	The schooner ran aground at Sunderland, County Durham. She was on a voyage from Dundee, Forfarshire to Sunderland. She was refloated.

== 9 October ==
List of shipwrecks: 9 October 1866
Ship	State	Description
Avon	United Kingdom	The ship was driven ashore and wrecked in Mount's Bay. She was on a voyage from Waterford to Southampton, Hampshire.
Rocher	United Kingdom	The ship foundered off Cádiz, Spain.

== 10 October ==
List of shipwrecks: 10 October 1866
Ship	State	Description
Louise Crawshay	United Kingdom	The passenger ferry, a paddle steamer, ran on an anchor and sank in the River Tyne at Walker, Northumberland. All on board were rescued.
Result	United Kingdom	The ship was burnt in Hobson's Bay, Melbourne, Victoria. She was on a voyage from London to Melbourne.

== 11 October ==
List of shipwrecks: 11 October 1866
Ship	State	Description
Rose de Mai	France	The ship ran aground and was beached at Havre de Grâce, Seine-Inférieure. She was on a voyage from Sunderland, County Durham, United Kingdom to Nantes, Loire-Inférieure.
Star of Ceylon, and Velanquez	United Kingdom; Spain	The barque Star of Ceylon was run into by the steamship Velanquez and sank off Dover, Kent. Two of her thirteen crew were reported missing. She was on a voyage from London to Galle, Ceylon. Velanquez was beached near Dover.

== 12 October ==
List of shipwrecks: 12 October 1866
Ship	State	Description
Richard Reynolds	United Kingdom	The ship was run ashore and severely damaged south of Kronstadt, Russia. She was on a voyage from Saint Petersburg, Russia to London.
Rocket	United Kingdom	The brigantine was wrecked near Cape Trafalgar, Spain with the loss of three of her six crew. She was on a voyage from Sunderland, County Durham to the Falkland Islands.
Sagemar	United States	The ship was destroyed by fire in the Atlantic Ocean. Her crew were rescued by the brig Bell of Devon (United Kingdom). Sagemar was on a voyage from Cardiff, Glamorgan, United Kingdom to Panama City, United States of Colombia.
Sicilia	United Kingdom	The steamship ran aground in the Gironde. She was on a voyage from the Clyde to Bordeaux, Gironde.

== 13 October ==
List of shipwrecks: 13 October 1866
Ship	State	Description
Royal Adelaide	United Kingdom	The ship foundered off the South Foreland, Kent. She was on a voyage from London to Antwerp, Belgium.
Uhlenhorst	Hamburg	The steamship ran aground in the Oste. She was on a voyage from Newcastle upon Tyne, Northumberland, United Kingdom to Hamburg. She was refloated and taken in to Hamburg.

== 15 October ==
List of shipwrecks: 15 October 1866
Ship	State	Description
Adelphi	United Kingdom	The brig was wrecked on the Vogel Sand, in the North Sea. Her crew were rescued. She was on a voyage from the River Wear to Hamburg.
Alice	United Kingdom	The brigantine ran aground on the Cutler Sand, in the North Sea off the coast of Suffolk. She was on a voyage from Rouen, Seine-Inférieure to the River Tyne. She was refloated and assisted in to Harwich, Essex in a severely leaky condition.
Christian IX	United Kingdom	The steamship was wrecked in the Faroe Islands. Her 30 crew survived.
Ocean	United Kingdom	The schooner struck the Plough Rock, off the coast of Northumberland. She was on a voyage from the River Wear to Arbroath, Forfarshire. She put in to Berwick upon Tweed, Northumberland.
Walvisch	United Kingdom	The ship was abandoned in the Atlantic Ocean. Her crew were rescued by Agra (United Kingdom). Walvisch was on a voyage from Falmouth, Cornwall to Quebec City, Province of Canada, British North America.
Woodville	United Kingdom	The schooner was driven ashore at Seaham, County Durham. She was on a voyage from Dunkirk, Nord, France to Seaham. She was refloated with assistance and taken in to Seaham.
Yorktown	Duchy of Holstein	The ship was abandoned in the Atlantic Ocean. Her crew were rescued by Hans (Flag unknown). Yorktown was on a voyage from London, United Kingdom to New York, United States.

== 16 October ==
List of shipwrecks: 16 October 1866
Ship	State	Description
Camperdown	United Kingdom	The steamship ran aground in the Firth of Tay between Broughty Ferry and Dundee, Forfarshire.
Chimborazo	United Kingdom	The ship was destroyed by fire in the Pacific Ocean. Her crew were rescued by Heather Bell (United Kingdom). Chimborazo was on a voyage from Swansea, Glamorgan to Coquimbo, Chile.
Emil	Denmark	The ship sank off Hirtshals. She was on a voyage from Køge to Hartlepool, County Durham, United Kingdom.
Queen	United Kingdom	The ship departed from Liverpool, Lancashire for New York, United States. No further trace, presumed foundered with the loss of all hands.

== 17 October ==
List of shipwrecks: 17 October 1866
Ship	State	Description
Alice Jane	United Kingdom	The ship ran aground on the Arklow Bank, in the Irish Sea off the coast of County Wicklow. She was on a voyage from the Clyde to Bahia, Brazil. She was latere refloated and resumed her voyage, but put in to Falmouth, Cornwall on 24 October in a leaky condition.
Favourite	(United Kingdom of Great Britain and Ireland) Isle of Man	The smack was driven ashore near Howth, County Dublin. Her eight crew were rescued by the Howth Lifeboat Sir George Bowles( Royal National Lifeboat Institution).
Lewis	United Kingdom	The barque ran aground on the Kentish Knock and was abandoned with the loss of her captain. She was on a voyage from Cartagena, Spain to Newcastle upon Tyne, Northumberland.
Stratton	United Kingdom	The ship ran aground on the Oyster Rocks, in the Channel Islands. She was refloated and taken in to Jersey in a severely leaky condition.
Wasp	United Kingdom	The cutter sprang a leak and foundered off the Kentish Knock. Her crew survived. She was on a voyage from Ramsgate, Kent to Sunderland, County Durham.

== 18 October ==
List of shipwrecks: 18 October 1866
Ship	State	Description
Betsey	United Kingdom	The smack was driven ashore and wrecked at Great Yarmouth, Norfolk. Her crew were rescued.
Clara Davis	United States	The fishing schooner was lost on the Georges Bank in a gale. Lost with all 8 hands.
John and James	United Kingdom	The ship ran aground on the Maplin Sand, in the North Sea off the coast of Essex.
Mason	United Kingdom	The sloop sprang a leak and was beached at Harwich, Essex. She was on a voyage from Newcastle upon Tyne, Northumberland to London.
Mogadore Packet	United Kingdom	The ship was driven ashore and wrecked at Port Soderick, Isle of Man. Her crew were rescued. She was on a voyage from Black River, Jamaica to Liverpool, Lancashire and/or the Clyde.
Northern Light	United Kingdom	The ship was abandoned in the Atlantic Ocean. She was on a voyage from Saint John's, Newfoundland to Newry, County Antrim.
Thessalia	United Kingdom	The ship ran aground on the Kentish Knock. She was on a voyage from Newcastle upon Tyne to Rio de Janeiro, Brazil. she was refloated and taken in to Harwich in a leaky condition.
Tweed	United Kingdom	The brig was wrecked on the Minatitlan Reef with the loss of a crew member. She was on a voyage from Minatitlán, Mexico to Liverpool.

== 19 October ==
List of shipwrecks: 19 October 1866
Ship	State	Description
Argus	United Kingdom	The ship was driven ashore and sank near Banff, Aberdeenshire. Her crew were rescued. She was on a voyage from South Shields, County Durham to Lossiemouth, Moray.
Constantia	United Kingdom	The barque ran aground on the Arklow Bank, in the Irish Sea off the coast of County Wicklow and was abandoned by her crew. She was on a voyage from Liverpool, Lancashire to Yokohama, Japan. She floated off and sank.
Freedom	United Kingdom	The brig was driven ashore at Hartlepool, County Durham. Her crew were rescued. Freedom was on a voyage from Havre de Grâce, Seine-Inférieure, France to Hartlepool. She was refloated on 22 October.
Vine	United Kingdom	The sloop was beached at Llandudno, Caernarfonshire. She was refloated.
Waterloo	United Kingdom	The steamship ran aground near Brielle, North Holland, Netherlands.
You	United Kingdom	The barque departed from Kurrachee, India for Marseille, Bouches-du-Rhône, France. No further trace, presumed foundered with the loss of all hands.

== 20 October ==
List of shipwrecks: 20 October 1866
Ship	State	Description
Fairy Vision	United Kingdom	The ship was wrecked at Tunchay Point, Bouches-du-Rhône, France. She was on a voyage from London to Marseille, Bouches-du-Rhône.
Osprey	United Kingdom	The schooner was driven ashore at Whitburn, County Durham.
Thracian	United Kingdom	The steamship collided with the paddle steamer Guadiana (Spain) and sank off Málaga, Spain. All on board were rescued. Thracian was on a voyage from Smyrna, Ottoman Empire to London.
Voluna	United Kingdom	The barque ran aground on the Long Bank, in the Irish Sea and was abandoned. She was on a voyage from Glasgow, Renfrewshire to Valparaíso, Chile. Five Customs officers boarded the vessel but their boat was wrecked. They were rescued by the Wexford Lifeboat. Volua was refloated with the assistance of a number of tugs and taken in to Wexford.

== 21 October ==
List of shipwrecks: 21 October 1866
Ship	State	Description
Guadiana	United Kingdom	The brig sprang a leak and foundered in the English Channel 40 nautical miles (74 km) south south east of Ouessant, Finistère, France. Her seven crew survived. She was on a voyage from Sunderland, County Durham to L'Orient, Morbihan, France.
Heinrich	Flag unknown	The ship departed from Kronstadt, Russia for Copenhagen, Denmark. No further trace, presumed foundered with the loss of all hands.
Iron Era	United Kingdom	The steamship ran aground on the Fish Sands, in the North Sea off the coast of County Durham. She was on a voyage from Dieppe, Seine-Inférieure, France to Hartlepool, County Durham. She was refloated and taken in to Hartlepool.

== 22 October ==
List of shipwrecks: 22 October 1866
Ship	State	Description
Annie Jones	United Kingdom	The schooner sprang a leak and foundered in the English Channel. Her crew were rescued by Prometheus ( Rostock). Annie Jones was on a voyage from Huelva, Spain to Newcastle upon Tyne, Northumberland.
John George	United Kingdom	The ship sprang a leak and was abandoned. She was on a voyage from Cardiff, Glamorgan to Havre de Grâce, Seine-Inférieure, France.
Mavournee	(United Kingdom) British North America	During a voyage from Portland, Maine, to St. John, New Brunswick, the 142-foot (43 m), 619-gross register ton barque was stranded on a reef in fog at Bradford Cove on Grand Manan, New Brunswick. She later floated off the reef and sank quickly in 90 feet (27 m) of water at 44°36.972′N 066°54.551′W. Her entire crew survived.
Nieta	United Kingdom	The steamship ran aground in the River Mersey. She was on a voyage from Liverpool, Lancashire to Santander, Spain. She was refloated and taken in to Birkenhead, Cheshire.

== 23 October ==
List of shipwrecks: 23 October 1866
Ship	State	Description
Augusta	United Kingdom	The steamship was towed in to Crookhaven, County Cork in a sinking condition. She was on a voyage from Liverpool, Lancashire to Pernambuco, Brazil.
Hilda	United Kingdom	The steamship ran aground at North Shields, Northumberland. She was on a voyage from Trondheim, Norway to North Shields. She was refloated.
Mary and May	United Kingdom	The brigantine was driven ashore at Arthurstown, County Wexford.
Rose	United Kingdom	The brigantine was driven ashore at Arthurstown.

== 24 October ==
List of shipwrecks: 24 October 1866
Ship	State	Description
Admiral	United Kingdom	The brig was driven ashore and wrecked at Wick, Caithness. Her crew were rescued. She was on a voyage from Norway to Wick.
Ann Mills	United Kingdom	The barque ran aground on the Pergas Shoals, in the Dardanelles. She was refloated.
Elsie	Norway	The brig ran aground on the Gaa Sands, off the mouth of the River Tay.
Helena	United Kingdom	The ship sprang a leak and sank in the North Sea 4 nautical miles (7.4 km) off North Berwick, Lothian. Her crew were rescued. She was on a voyage from Methil, Fife to Kiel, Prussia.
Loyal	(United Kingdom of Great Britain and Ireland) Jersey	The brig collided with the steamship James Brogden (United Kingdom) and sank in the River Thames at Blackwall, Middlesex. Her crew were rescued. She was refloated on 6 December and beached at East Greenwich Kent.
Thrifty	(United Kingdom of Great Britain and Ireland) Jersey	The cutter sank at Weymouth, Dorset with the loss of one of her six crew. She was on a voyage from Erquy, Côtes-du-Nord, France to Weymouth. She was refloated.

== 25 October ==
List of shipwrecks: 25 October 1866
Ship	State	Description
City of Brussels	United Kingdom	The ship departed from Stralsund for Leith, Lothian. No further trace, presumed foundered with the loss of all hands.
Rovigno	Austrian Empire	The barque was wrecked at Ancona, Papal States. Her crew were rescued. She was on a voyage from Cardiff, Glamorgan, United Kingdom to Ancona.

== 26 October ==
List of shipwrecks: 26 October 1866
Ship	State	Description
Emily Ann	United Kingdom	The schooner ran aground on the Bembridge Ledge, off the Isle of Wight. She was on a voyage from Caernarfon to Littlehampton, Sussex.
Friends	United Kingdom	The ship struck a submerged object and sank off Caldy Island Pembrokeshire. Her crew were rescued. She was on a voyage from Cardigan to Swansea, Glamorgan.

== 27 October ==
List of shipwrecks: 27 October 1866
Ship	State	Description
Elizabeth and Ann	United Kingdom	The ship collided with a barque and sank in the River Mersey. She was on a voyage from Par, Cornwall to Runcorn, Cheshire.

== 28 October ==
List of shipwrecks: 28 October 1866
Ship	State	Description
Earl Bathurst	United Kingdom	The brig was wrecked on Gotland, Sweden. Her crew were rescued. She was on a voyage from Swinemünde, Prussia to Riga, Russia.
John Butler	United Kingdom	The brigantine was driven ashore at Buenos Aires, Argentina.
Marie Elise	France	The barque sank at Buenos Aires with the loss of most of her crew.
Napoleon III	France	The barque sank at Buenos Aires with the loss of most of her crew.
Urgent	United Kingdom	The barque was driven ashore and wrecked at Buenos Aires.
Two unnamed vessels	Flags unknown	The ships sank at Buenos Aires.

== 29 October ==
List of shipwrecks: 29 October 1866
Ship	State	Description
Caprera	United Kingdom	The ship was sighted off Helsingør, Denmark whilst on a voyage from Kronstadt, Russia to Wisbech, Cambridgeshire. No further trace, presumed foundered with the loss of all hands.
Constance Amelia	United Kingdom	The barque was wrecked on the Curaisser Bank, in the River Plate. Her crew were rescued.
Emperor	United Kingdom	The ship was abandoned in the Atlantic Ocean. She was on a voyage from Demerara, British Guiana to London.
Glen	United Kingdom	The sloop foundered in the North Sea 16 nautical miles (30 km) south of the mouth of the Humber. Her crew were rescued by a French lugger. She was on a voyage from South Shields, County Durham to Benfleet, Essex.
Joblings	United Kingdom	The sloop ran aground on the Cockle Sand, in the North Sea off the coast of Norfolk. She was refloated and resumed her voyage.
John Butler	United Kingdom	The brigantine was driven ashore in the River Plate.
Marie Elize	France	The barque sank in the River Plate with some loss of life.
Mercedita	Spain	The barque was driven ashore in the River Plate.
Napoleon III	France	The barque sank in the River Plate with some loss of life.
Palma	Brazil	The brigantine was driven ashore in the River Plate.
Ribiero II	Brazil	The brigantine was driven ashore in the River Plate.
Rosetta	United Kingdom	The barque collided with the steamship La Plata (Argentina) and sank at Buenos Aires, Argentina.
Sunda	United Kingdom	The ship ran aground and capsized at Liverpool, Lancashire with the loss of six of the 21 people on board. Survivors were rescued by a tug and the Liverpool Lifeboat. She was on a voyage from Liverpool to Aden.
Urgent	United Kingdom	The barque was driven ashore and wrecked in the River Plate.
Zambia	France	The ship was wrecked on the St. Brandon Reef with the loss of two of her crew. She was on a voyage from Liverpool to Bombay, India.

== 30 October ==
List of shipwrecks: 30 October 1866
Ship	State	Description
Legatus	United Kingdom	The brig ran aground on the Krutsand, in the Elbe. She was on a voyage from Newcastle upon Tyne to Cuxhaven. She was refloated and taken in to Cuxhaven.

== 31 October ==
List of shipwrecks: 31 October 1866
Ship	State	Description
Bullygar	United Kingdom	The whaler was driven ashore and wrecked in Cumberland Sound.
Halicore	United Kingdom	The brig was driven ashore on Læsø, Denmark. She was on a voyage from Kronstadt, Russia to London. She was refloated and taken in to Helsingør, Denmark.
Juno	(United Kingdom of Great Britain and Ireland) Tasmania	The barque, laden with 466 tons of coal, was wrecked on Farewell Spit, New Zealand. All hands were saved but the cargo was lost.

== Unknown date ==
List of shipwrecks: Unknown date in October 1866
Ship	State	Description
Andrew Jackson	United States	The steamship was driven ashore in Currituck Sound. All on board were rescued.
Annie Mackenzie	(United Kingdom of Great Britain and Ireland) British North America	The barque was abandoned in the Atlantic Ocean before 23 October. She was on a voyage from the Clyde to Montreal, Province of Canada.
Armitage	United Kingdom	The ship was wrecked on the coast of Iceland.
Belgravia	United Kingdom	The ship was wrecked near Madras, India.
Borodino	United Kingdom	The ship was abandoned in the Indian Ocean before 10 October. Her crew survived. She was on a voyage from Bombay, India to Mauritius.
Caroline Naysmith	United Kingdom	The ship was wrecked on the Florida Reef.
Catharina	Denmark	The brig was wrecked at "Tientain".
Coburg	United Kingdom	The ship foundered in the Atlantic Ocean. She was on a voyage from Liverpool, Lancashire to New York, United States.
Daniel Webster	United States	The steamship foundered. All on board were rescued. She was on a voyage from New York to Mobile, Alabama.
Defiance	United Kingdom	The brig was run down by the steamship Haswell (United Kingdom) and sank in the Swin. Her crew were rescued by Haswell.
Courier	United Kingdom	The ship foundered in the Atlantic Ocean. She was on a voyage from Liverpool to New York.
Eleanor Thompson	United Kingdom	The brig was driven ashore near Trelleborg, Sweden. She was on a voyage from Antwerp, Belgium to Kronstadt, Russia. She was refloated.
Elite	United Kingdom	The ship was wrecked on Andros, Bahamas.
Fanny Fern	United Kingdom	The ship was wrecked on Prince Edward Island, British North America. She was on a voyage from Miramichi, New Brunswick, British North America to Cork.
Forward	United Kingdom	The ship was wrecked on the Hogsty Reef, Bahamas before 9 October. She was on a voyage from Jamaica to Halifax, Nova Scotia, British North America.
General Sherman	United States	The schooner was captured by pirates in the Yangtze. The vessel was set afire and all on board, who had been tied up, were murdered.
Hastings	United States	The ship foundered in the Atlantic Ocean. Her crew were rescued. She was on a voyage from Boston, Massachusetts to New Orleans, Louisiana.
Helene, and Rapid	Flag unknown United Kingdom	The ships collided and both foundered with the loss of a crew member from Rapid. Survivors were rescued by the brig Countess of Zetland (United Kingdom).
Herald of the Morning	United Kingdom	The ship ran aground on a reef in the Dampier Passage (4°50′S 146°48′E) and was damaged. She was on a voyage from Newcastle, New South Wales to Cheribon, Netherlands East Indies. She was refloated and resumed her voyage but put in to Surabaya, Netherlands East Indies in a leaky condition.
Isabella	United Kingdom	The ship was lost near "Araucatie". She was on a voyage from the Clyde to Buenos Aires, Argentina.
James Crossfield	United Kingdom	The ship ran aground at Calcutta, India. She was refloated.
Jules	France	The schooner ran aground and was wrecked 6 nautical miles (11 km) off the Casquets Lighthouse, Alderney, Channel Islands. Her crew were rescued. She was on a voyage from the River Wear to Nantes, Loire-Inférieure.
Lampedo	United Kingdom	The ship ran aground at Warsaw, Georgia, United States. She was refloated and towed in to Savannah, Georgia.
Lima	United Kingdom	The brig foundered in the Irish Sea 27 nautical miles (50 km) south south east of the Carlingford Lough with the loss of six of her nine crew. She was on a voyage from the Clyde to Genoa, Italy.
Lucy Napier	(United Kingdom of Great Britain and Ireland) British North America	The brig was run down and sunk. She was on a voyage from the River Tyne to Danzig.
Maria	United Kingdom	The ship was wrecked on the Double Head Shot Keys. She was on a voyage from Matanzas, Cuba to Puerto Rico.
Onward	United Kingdom	The ship ran aground near Helsingør, Denmark. She was refloated.
Oscar	Austrian Empire	The ship was wrecked at Pernambuco, Brazil.
Phoque	France	The ship was lost at the mouth of the Rhône.
Premium	United Kingdom	The barque was abandoned in the North Sea after 25 October. She was on a voyage from Seaham, County Durham to the Nieuw Diep. She came ashore at Callantsoog, North Holland on 30 October and was wrecked.
Prosperity	United Kingdom	The Yorkshire Billyboy was driven ashore and wrecked at Dimlington, Yorkshire before 2 October. Her crew were rescued. She was on a voyage from Sunderland, County Durham to Harwich, Essex.
Rajpoot	India	The ship was wrecked. She was on a voyage from London to Calcutta.
Rocket	United Kingdom	The brigantine foundered.
Santiago	Chile	The ship was wrecked in the Falkland Islands. She was on a voyage from Iquique to Marseille, Bouches-du-Rhône, France.
Seaman's Bride	United Kingdom	The ship was wrecked on "Treinen Island". Her crew survived.
Simon Hobbey	United Kingdom	The barque collided with Star of the Sea (United States) and sank off Cape Horn, Chile.
Statesman	United Kingdom	The ship was wrecked on the Gaspar Sand. Her crew were rescued.
Sylph	(United Kingdom of Great Britain and Ireland) New Zealand	The schooner left Kaipara Harbour for Auckland on 10 October. Wreckage from the ship was washed up near Ahipara eight days later. All hands were lost.
Talisman	United Kingdom	The ship was wrecked on the Englishman's Bank, in the River Plate. She was on a voyage from Cardiff, Glamorgan to Montevideo, Uruguay.
Tanjore	United Kingdom	The barque either sank in St. Mark's Bay, Haiti, or was wrecked at Saint Domingo.
Victoria	United Kingdom	The steamship foundered. All on board were rescued.
