= List of shipwrecks in July 1862 =

The list of shipwrecks in July 1862 includes ships sunk, foundered, grounded, or otherwise lost during July 1862.

== 1 July ==
List of shipwrecks: 1 July 1862
Ship	State	Description
Canada	United Kingdom	The ship was sighted whilst on a voyage from Akyab, Burma to Falmouth, Cornwall. No further trace, presumed foundered with the loss of all twenty crew.

== 2 July ==
List of shipwrecks: 2 July 1862
Ship	State	Description
King Arthur	United Kingdom	The ship ran aground on the Inner Banks, in the Fullah Channel. She was on a voyage from Liverpool, Lancashire to Calcutta, India. She was refloated and towed in to Calcutta.
Réunion	France	The ship ran aground in the Hooghly River. She was on a voyage from Bordeaux, Gironde to Calcutta. She was refloated and completed her voyage.
Solferino	United Kingdom	The full-rigged ship ran aground in the Hooghly River. She was on a voyage from Newport, Monmouthshire to Calcutta. She was refloated and towed in to Calcutta.

== 3 July ==
List of shipwrecks: 3 July 1862
Ship	State	Description
Egbert	United Kingdom	The ship was wrecked on Bornholm, Denmark. She was on a voyage from Pori, Grand Duchy of Finland to Wisbech, Cambridgeshire.
Sally	United Kingdom	The smack was wrecked on the Longsand, in the North Sea off the coast of Essex. Both crew were rescued by the brig Sally (United Kingdom).
Sophia	Sweden	The ship sank off Bornholm. Her crew were rescued. She was on a voyage from Brussels, Flanders, Belgium to Gothenburg.

== 4 July ==
List of shipwrecks: 4 July 1862
Ship	State	Description
Cactus	United Kingdom	The brig ran aground in the Saint Lawrence River. She was refloated.
Gleaner	United Kingdom	The ship was run ashore south of Seaham, County Durham. She was on a voyage from Great Yarmouth, Norfolk to Seaham. She had broken up by 8 July.
Richard O′Brien	United Kingdom	American Civil War. Union blockade: The schooner, a blockade runner bound from Jamaica to Matamoros, Mexico, with a cargo of rum, sugar, and medicines, was forced aground and burned about 17 miles (27 km) southwest of Galveston, Texas and 6 miles (10 km) east of Velasco, Texas, Confederate States of America by the armed sidewheel paddle steamer USS Rhode Island (United States Navy).
William	United Kingdom	The schooner was driven ashore and wrecked at Redcar, Yorkshire.

== 5 July ==
List of shipwrecks: 5 July 1862
Ship	State	Description
Alma	United Kingdom	The ship ran aground on the Lister. She was on a voyage from Liverpool, Lancashire to Halifax, Nova Scotia, British North America. She was refloated and taken in to Halifax in a waterlogged condition.
Valiant	United Kingdom	The schooner was in collision with another vessel and was beached at Holmes Hole, Massachusetts, United States. She was on a voyage from New York to Saint John, New Brunswick, British North America.
Wadiatool Rahimon	India	The ship was wrecked at "Hurnee", India with the loss of ten of her crew. She was on a voyage from Bombay to Singapore, Straits Settlements.

== 6 July ==
List of shipwrecks: 6 July 1862
Ship	State	Description
Jagaren	Sweden	The ship was driven ashore near Torreby. Her crew were rescued. She was on a voyage from Stockholm to Hull, Yorkshire, United Kingdom.
Mary	United Kingdom	The ship collided with a steamship. She consequently foundered the next day. Her crew were rescued by Emanuel da Rosa (flag unknown). Mary was on a voyage from Montrose, Forfarshire to Brazil.
Superior	United Kingdom	The sloop was driven ashore and wrecked at Kingsbarns, Fife with the presumed loss of both hands.
Weymouth	United Kingdom	The ship was abandoned in the North Sea. She was taken in to Whitby, Yorkshire in a derelict condition.
Unidentified schooner	Unknown	American Civil War, Union blockade: The schooner was found wrecked at Deep River Inlet on the coast of North Carolina, Confederate States of America by the armed screw steamer USS Monticello (United States Navy).

== 7 July ==
List of shipwrecks: 7 July 1862
Ship	State	Description
George	United Kingdom	The collier was lost in the Eider. She was on a voyage from South Shields, County Durham to Hamburg.
Leith	United Kingdom	The steamship was driven ashore and wrecked on Saaremaa, Russia. All 42 people on board were rescued. She was on a voyage from Leith, Lothian to Kronstadt, Russia.

== 8 July ==
List of shipwrecks: 8 July 1862
Ship	State	Description
Claremion	United Kingdom	The ship ran aground in the Hooghly River. She was on a voyage from Birkenhead, Cheshire to Calcutta, India. She was refloated and completed her voyage.
Silistria	United Kingdom	The barque was destroyed by fire off Cape Recife, Cape Colony. Her crew were rescued by the barque Ramillies (United Kingdom). Silistria was on a voyage from Cochin, India to London.
Sputh Sea	United Kingdom	The full-rigged ship was driven ashore at "Nyzam", India. She was on a voyage from London to Calcutta. She was refloated and taken in to Calcutta.

== 9 July ==
List of shipwrecks: 9 July 1862
Ship	State	Description
Frank	China	The salvage schooner ran aground in the Yangtze and was wrecked.
James	United Kingdom	The schooner was driven ashore in Glenelg Bay. She was on a voyage from Barrow-in-Furness, Lancashire to Newcastle upon Tyne, Northumberland. She was refloated.
Rose	United Kingdom	The barque was destroyed by fire in the Indian Ocean. Her crew were rescued by New Holland (United Kingdom). Rose was on a voyage from Algoa Bay to London.
Shingiss	United States	The 185-ton sternwheel paddle steamer struck a snag and sank in the Mississippi River 7 miles (11 km) below Fort Pillow, Tennessee, Confederate States of America. She was refloated on 13 July.
Sword Fish	United States	The clipper was driven ashore and wrecked in the Yangtze. She was on a voyage from Shanghai to Amoy, China.

== 10 July ==
List of shipwrecks: 10 July 1862
Ship	State	Description
Aberaman	United Kingdom	The ship ran aground on the Panela Rocks, off the coast of Argentina and was severely damaged. She was on a voyage from Liverpool, Lancashire to the River Plate.
Allendale	United Kingdom	The brig was driven ashore in Hell Gate.
Belle Italia	Confederate States of America	American Civil War: The sloop or schooner was scuttled at Lamar, Texas, to prevent her capture by the approaching barque USS Arthur (United States Navy). She was refloated later in July or in August.
Catherine	United Kingdom	The schooner ran aground on the Goldstone Rock, off the coast of Northumberland. She was on a voyage from Blyth, Northumberland to Montrose, Forfarshire. She was refloated with assistance and taken in to Lindisfarne, Northumberland.
John Bull	United Kingdom	The ship was driven ashore on Miscou Island, New Brunswick, British North America. She was on a voyage from Dalhousie, New Brunswick to Fleetwood, Lancashire. John Bull was refloated on 25 July and taken in to Little Shippegan.
Kendal	United Kingdom	The ship was driven ashore near Cape Marston, New South Wales and was subsequently destroyed by fire. Her crew survived. She was on a voyage from Launceston, Tasmania to Colombo, Ceylon.
Monte Christo	Confederate States of America	American Civil War: The schooner was burned by the Confederates at Lamar, Texas to prevent her capture by the bark USS Arthur (United States Navy).

== 11 July ==
List of shipwrecks: 11 July 1862
Ship	State	Description
Agenoria	United Kingdom	The schooner was run into by the steamship Great Northern (United Kingdom) in the River Thames and was run ashore at Gravesend, Kent.
Lima	United Kingdom	The paddle steamer ran aground and was wrecked 57 nautical miles (106 km) south of Coquimbo, Chile. All on board, about 65 crew and 40-50 passengers, were rescued. She was on a voyage from Panama City, Granadine Confederation to Valparaíso, Chile.

== 12 July ==
List of shipwrecks: 12 July 1862
Ship	State	Description
Aglae	France	The schooner ran aground on the Longsand, in the North Sea off the coast of Essex, United Kingdom. She was on a voyage from Seaham, County Durham, United Kingdom to Isigny-sur-Mer, Calvados. She was refloated and assisted in to Harwich, Essex in a leaky condition.
Betsey Packet	United Kingdom	The smack capsized and sank off Sanda Island with the loss of a crew member. She was on a voyage from Glasgow, Renfrewshire to Larne, County Antrim.
John and Rebecca	United Kingdom	The Yorkshire Billyboy was driven ashore at Wells-next-the-Sea, Norfolk. She was on a voyage from Hartlepool, County Durham to Cley-next-the-Sea, Norfolk. She was refloated and towed in to Wells-next-the-Sea.

== 13 July ==
List of shipwrecks: 13 July 1862
Ship	State	Description
Swordfish	United Kingdom	The ship was driven ashore and wrecked in the Yangtze. She was on a voyage from Shanghai to Amoy, China.
Unnamed	Denmark	A schooner struck a sunken wreck and foundered in the North Sea off Saltfleet, Lincolnshire, United Kingdom.

== 14 July ==
List of shipwrecks: 14 July 1862
Ship	State	Description
Perekop	United Kingdom	The full-rigged ship was abandoned off Struys Bay. She was on a voyage from the Swan River to London.
Phantom	United States	The medium clipper was wrecked on the Pilot Reef, in the Pratas Shoals. All 38 people on board survived. She was on a voyage from San Francisco, California to Hong Kong.
Unnamed	United Kingdom	A barque ran aground on the West Rocks, off the coast of Essex. She was on a voyage from Stockholm, Sweden to London. She was refloated with the assistance of a smack and resumed her voyage.
Unnamed	Ottoman Navy	A warship was wrecked in the Danube at the Iron Gates, Belgrade, Principality of Serbia .

== 15 July ==
List of shipwrecks: 15 July 1862
Ship	State	Description
Arab	United Kingdom	The ship was driven ashoreat Pernambuco, Brazil. She was consequently condemned.
Boomerang	United Kingdom	The brig, in the Pentland Firth from Havana for Copenhagen, struck on St. John's Point, swung off, and sank in deep water. Her crew survived.
Carolus Magnus	United Kingdom	The ship was driven ashore at New York, United States. She was on a voyage from New York to Liverpool, Lancashire. She was refloated and resumed her voyage.
Johanna Wagner	Prussia	The barque was wrecked at Strandfontein, Cape Colony, with no loss of life.
Marquis of Bute	United Kingdom	The ship ran aground in the Saint Charles River. She was refloated and resumed her voyage.
Picton	United Kingdom	The ship was driven ashore at Quebec City, Province of Canada, British North America.
USS Sidney C. Jones	United States Navy	American Civil War: Aground in the Mississippi River below Vicksburg, Mississippi, the mortar schooner was blown up and burned to prevent her capture by Confederate forces.

== 16 July ==
List of shipwrecks: 16 July 1862
Ship	State	Description
Catharina Louisa	United Kingdom	The brig was wrecked at the mouth of the Goatzacoalcos. All o n board were rescued.
No. 619	Russia	The lighter sank whilst on a voyage from Kronstadt to Saint Petersburg.

== 17 July ==
List of shipwrecks: 17 July 1862
Ship	State	Description
Hawk	United Kingdom	The yacht foundered in a squall in the River Thames at Erith, Kent with the loss of four of her five crew.
Frances Catherine	United Kingdom	The ship ran aground and was wrecked at Minatitlán, Mexico. Her crew were rescued.

== 18 July ==
List of shipwrecks: 18 July 1862
Ship	State	Description
Girardus Jacobus	Flag unknown	The ship ran aground on the St. Nicholas Shoal, off Manila, Spanish East Indies. She was on a voyage from Manila to London, United Kingdom. She was refloated on 21 July.
Johanna Wagner	Netherlands	The ship was wrecked in False Bay. She was on a voyage from Batavia, Netherlands East Indies to Rotterdam, South Holland.

== 19 July ==
List of shipwrecks: 19 July 1862
Ship	State	Description
Commodore	United Kingdom	The brig was wrecked on the Horse Bank, in the Irish Sea off the coast of Lancashire. All on board were rescued. She came ashore at Southport on 21 July.
Mary Key	United Kingdom	The ship struck the Salt Stones, in the North Sea off the coast of Aberdeenshire and was abandoned by her crew. She was on a voyage from Hamburg to Macduff, Aberdeenshire. She subsequently drove ashore and was wrecked.

== 20 July ==
List of shipwrecks: 20 July 1862
Ship	State	Description
Planet	United Kingdom	The steamship was damaged by fire at Hamburg.
Robert	United Kingdom	The sloop was wrecked on the Dangerous Patch, in the Irish Sea off the coast of Lancashire with the loss of all hands. She was on a voyage from Liverpool to Barrow-in-Furness.
Thankful	United Kingdom	The schooner was driven ashore and wrecked at Burghead, Moray with the loss of her pilot.

== 21 July ==
List of shipwrecks: 21 July 1862
Ship	State	Description
Agenoria	United Kingdom	The ship collided with the barque Waterlily (United Kingdom) in the North Sea 7 nautical miles (13 km) east of Spurn Point, Yorkshire. She was taken in tow by the smack Myrtle (United Kingdom) but consequently sank. Her crew were rescued Agenoria was on a voyage from Lowestoft, Suffolk to South Shields, County Durham.
Caroline	France	The schooner collided with the brig Teresetta (Italy) and sank in the English Channel off the coast of Devon, United Kingdom. Caroline was on a voyage from Stockholm, Sweden to Bordeaux, Gironde.
Egberdina Annechiena	Netherlands	The brig foundered 10 nautical miles (19 km) off Port-au-Prince, Haiti. Her twelve crew took to two boats. Those in one boat were rescued by a Bremen vessel. The others reached Port Royal, Jamaica on 30 July. Egberdina Annechiena was on a voyage from Liverpool, Lancashire, United Kingdom to Port-au-Prince.
Ellen Mary	United Kingdom	The ship was driven ashore in Hirsholmene, Denmark.
USS Sallie Wood	United States Navy	American Civil War: Disabled by Confederate artillery fire from Argyle Landing, Mississippi, and Island No. 82 in the Mississippi River, the troop transport ran aground on Island No. 82 and was abandoned by her passengers and crew under Confederate shelling. Confederate forces then stripped and burned her.
Southerner	United States	The 393-ton sidewheel paddle steamer was sunk in a collision on the Mississippi River at College Point, Louisiana.
Vigilant	United Kingdom	The ship was driven ashore at Sennen, Cornwall.

== 22 July ==
List of shipwrecks: 22 July 1862
Ship	State	Description
Fame	United Kingdom	The ship foundered off Minehead, Somerset. She was on a voyage from Newport, Monmouthshire to Ilfracombe, Devon.

== 23 July ==
List of shipwrecks: 23 July 1862
Ship	State	Description
Alert	United Kingdom	The ship departed from Peel, Isle of Man for Neath, Glamorgan. No further trace, presumed foundered with the loss of all hands.
British Trident	United Kingdom	The ship broke from her moorings and ran aground at Port Adelaide, South Australia. She was refloated.
Honor	United Kingdom	The smack was driven ashore in Freshwater Bay, Pembrokeshire.
Indian Empire	United Kingdom	The steamship was destroyed by fire in the River Thames near Deptford, Kent.

== 24 July ==
List of shipwrecks: 24 July 1862
Ship	State	Description
Dundreary	United Kingdom	The yacht foundered in the Atlantic Ocean with the loss of seventeen of the 25 people on board. Survivors were rescued by the brig Anglesea (United Kingdom). Dundreary was on a voyage from Southampton, Hampshire to Gibraltar.
Lord of the Isles	United Kingdom	The clipper burned in the South China Sea at either 12°13′N 114°50′E or 12°13′N 115°50′E during a voyage from Hong Kong to Greenock, Renfrewshire. All 30 people on board made Macao, China in the ship’s boats despite being boarded twice by pirates.

== 25 July ==
List of shipwrecks: 25 July 1862
Ship	State	Description
Castle Garden	United States	The 161-ton sternwheel paddle steamer was stranded on the Ohio River at Mound City, Illinois.
HMS Ferret	Royal Navy	The brig ran aground at Kinsale, County Cork. Subsequently refloated, repaired and returned to service.
Mary Campbell	United Kingdom	The smack was driven ashore in Lough Foyle. She was on a voyage from Greenock, Renfrewshire to Londonderry. She was refloated on 28 July and towed in to Londonderry.
Oak	United Kingdom	The ship sprang a leak and foundered in the North Sea off the coast of Fife. Her crew were rescued by Else (United Kingdom). Oak was on a voyage from Newcastle upon Tyne, Northumberland to Pettycur, Fife.
Sarah	United Kingdom	The schooner sprang a leak in the North Sea. She was abandoned the next day. Her three crew were rescued by the fishing smack Eendracht (Netherlands). An attempt was subsequently made to pump her out but had to be abandoned.

== 26 July ==
List of shipwrecks: 26 July 1862
Ship	State	Description
Louisa Reed	United States	American Civil War: Confederate forces boarded and burned the schooner either on the James River in Virginia or on the lower Potomac River. The sloop-of-war USS Wachusett (United States Navy) discovered her wreck on 26 July, and her boarding and burning may have occurred earlier.

== 27 July ==
List of shipwrecks: 27 July 1862
Ship	State	Description
Golden Gate	United States	Carrying 262 passengers, a crew of 96, and a cargo of gold bullion and specie and possibly gold dust and nuggets on a voyage from San Francisco, California, the 2,067-ton sidewheel paddle steamer caught fire and ran aground in heavy fog on the coast of Mexico 15 miles (24 km) north of Manzanillo, Mexico then broke up in huge breakers with the loss of between 176 and 198 lives. The approximately 100 survivors made it to shore and began to walk toward Manzanillo, but were picked up along the way by boats from the steamer St. Louis (flag unknown) and by the Manzanillo customs boat (Mexico).
Jacob Bell	United States	The extreme clipper was driven ashore near Whampoa, Hong Kong. She was later refloated.
Rafaellina	Italy	The polacca ran aground on the English Bank, in the River Plate and was wrecked.

== 28 July ==
List of shipwrecks: 28 July 1862
Ship	State	Description
Annie Cannon	United Kingdom	The steamship was driven ashore at Briton Ferry, Glamorgan. She had been refloated by 25 August.
Eolus	Kingdom of Hanover	The ship was driven ashore at St Mary's, Isles of Scilly, United Kingdom. She was on a voyage from the River Tyne to Seville, Spain.

== 29 July ==
List of shipwrecks: 29 July 1862
Ship	State	Description
Warbler	United Kingdom	The ship was wrecked on the Niding Reef, in the Baltic Sea. Her crew were rescued. She was on a voyage from Liverpool, Lancashire to Kronstadt, Russia.

== 31 July ==
List of shipwrecks: 31 July 1862
Ship	State	Description
Mary Woodruff	Flag unknown	The full-rigged ship was lost in Puget Sound at Camano Island on the coast of Washington Territory. She later was salvaged.

== Unknown date ==
List of shipwrecks: Unknown date in July 1862
Ship	State	Description
Abraham	United Kingdom	The whaler was crushed by ice and sank in Melville Bay.
Alexander	United Kingdom	The whaler was crushed by ice and sank in Melville Bay. Her crew survived.
Arveskong	Sweden	The ship was driven ashore near the entrance to the Agger Canal, Denmark. She was on a voyage from Porto, Portugal to Stockholm.
Capitol	Confederate States of America	American Civil War: The sidewheel paddle steamer, damaged by fire at Liverpool, Mississippi, on 28 June, was sunk as a blockship in the Yazoo River in Mississippi.
Eagle	United Kingdom	The schooner was wrecked off Madagascar. She was on a voyage from Mauritius to Cape Town, Cape Colony.
Edgar	United Kingdom	The ship was lost whilst on a voyage from a Baltic port to a British port.
Edward Barron	(United Kingdom of Great Britain and Ireland) British North America	The brig foundered before 14 July. Her nine crew took to two boats; they were rescued that day by the schooner S. F. Abbott (United States). Edward Barron was on a voyage from Cienfuegos, Cuba to Falmouth, Cornwall.
Ellerslie	United Kingdom	The ship was damaged by ice in Arksuth Fjord, Greenland. She was consequently condemned.
Falstaff	Danzig	The ship was taken in to North Shields, Northumberland, United Kingdom in a derelict condition.
Firefly	United States	The ship was wrecked on the coast of Florida, Confederate States of America before 8 July. Her crew were rescued. She was on a voyage from Aspinwall, Granadine Confederation to New York.
Frank	United States	The schooner was wrecked in the Yangtze after 6 July whilst going to the assistance of Swordfish (United Kingdom).
Gezina Reina	Flag unknown	The ship was wrecked before 24 July.
Hendrik	United Kingdom	The ship foundered off Lisbon, Portugal.
Hersilia	United Kingdom	The ship was wrecked on the coast of Lapland, Norway before 26 July. Her crew survived She was on a voyage from Arkhangelsk, Russia to London.
Hudson	United Kingdom	The brig was abandoned in the Atlantic Ocean. Her crew were rescued by Ensign (United Kingdom). Hudson was on a voyage from Richibucto, New Brunswick, British North America to Cork.
J. Wakefield	United States	The full-rigged ship ran aground in the Basilan Strait before 18 July. She was on a voyage from Manila, Spanish East Indies to London.
Lord Gambier	United Kingdom	The whaler was lost in Melville Bay before 5 July. Her crew were rescued.
Manelett	United Kingdom	Carrying a cargo of coal, the schooner was wrecked on Block Island, Rhode Island, United States.
Muta	United Kingdom	The brig grounded at Narva, Russia. She was on a voyage from Narva to Hartlepool, County Durham. She continued her voyage but consequently put in to Lillesand, Norway in a waterlogged condition.
Prioress	United Kingdom	The ship ran aground on the Rifleman Shoals. She was on a voyage from Shediac, New Brunswick to Liverpool, Lancashire. She was refloated and resumed her voyage, arriving at Liverpool on 31 July.
Prospect	United Kingdom	The ship foundered off Dunstanburgh Castle, Northumberland.
Regina Hellechina	Flag unknown	The ship was wrecked before 24 July.
Resolution	United Kingdom	The whaler, a steamship, was lost in the Davis Strait. Her crew survived.
Sara Hendrika	United Kingdom	The ship was driven ashore at Porto de Pedras, Brazil before 15 July. she was on a voyage from Bahia, Brazil to Falmouth.
Sœbloemerten	Denmark	The ship foundered off Aalborg.
Thames City	United Kingdom	The ship was abandoned in the Atlantic Ocean. Her crew were rescued by Rothschild (United States). Thames City was on a voyage from Mauritius to London.
Wanderer	United Kingdom	The ship was driven ashore on Islay, Inner Hebrides. She was on a voyage from Troon, Ayrshire to Londonderry. She was refloated on 26 July.
Unidentified schooner	Confederate States of America	American Civil War, Union blockade: The schooner was forced ashore near Mobile, Alabama in early July by the gunboat USS Kanawha (United States Navy). Confederate forces then burned her.
Unidentified schooner	Confederate States of America	American Civil War: Loaded with concrete, the schooner was scuttled as blockship by Confederate forces in Aransas Bay off the coast of Texas.
