= USS Hastings =

Gunboat of the United States Navy

History

United States
- Ordered: as Emma Duncan
- Laid down: date unknown
- Launched: 1860
- Acquired: March 1863
- Commissioned: April 1863
- Decommissioned: 7 July 1865
- Stricken: 1865 (est.)
- Fate: Sold, 17 August 1865

General characteristics
- Displacement: 293 tons
- Length: 173 ft (53 m)
- Beam: 34 ft 2 in (10.41 m)
- Depth of hold: 5 ft 4 in (1.63 m)
- Propulsion: steam engine; side wheel-propelled
- Speed: not known
- Complement: not known
- Armament: two 30-pounder guns; two 32-pounder guns; four 24-pounder guns

USS Hastings was a steamer purchased by the Union Navy during the American Civil War. She was used by the Union Navy as a gunboat assigned to patrol Confederate waterways.

Hastings, a small wooden gunboat, was built as Emma Duncan in 1860 at Monongahela, Pennsylvania, and operated as a river transport out of Cincinnati, Ohio. She was purchased at Cairo, Illinois, in March 1863 from J. Bachelor. Fitted out and ready for service in April; her first commanding officer was Acting Master W. N. Griswold. Rear Admiral David Dixon Porter recommended that her name be changed to Hastings 7 April 1863.

== Hastings receives battle damage in Confederate waterways ==
One of the group of lightly built steamers which bore the brunt of the war on the Mississippi River tributaries, Hastings was initially assigned to the Tennessee River. While steaming upriver to report for duty, she received her baptism of fire when attacked by Confederate guerrillas near Green Bottom Bar 24 April. Captain Griswold rounded to and engaged the Confederates for a time, after which they withdrew. The light gunboat was hulled seven times and suffered three casualties in the action.

== Assisting General Sherman’s march ==
Hastings then assumed duty as a convoy ship for Union Army transports on the Tennessee River. In May she was sent briefly for duty at the mouth of the Yazoo River, but was soon back on the Tennessee. She arrived in Eastport, Mississippi, 26 October 1863 to assist General William Tecumseh Sherman's troops in crossing the river during operations culminating in the Third Battle of Chattanooga, and steamed to Paducah, Kentucky, when that city was threatened by Confederate cavalry 8 November. In need of repairs, Hastings returned to the Naval Station at Cairo, Illinois, 16 December.

== Louisiana operations in support of General Kilby Smith ==
Hastings resumed active patrolling in April 1864, and was detailed to convoy General Thomas Kilby Smith's transports from Springfield Landing to Grand Ecore, Louisiana. Union troops had suffered defeat at the Battle of Pleasant Hill, and the land portion of the Red River Campaign was deemed a failure. Covering the withdrawal of Smith's troops, Hastings took part 12 April in an engagement with Confederate cavalry and artillery near Blair's Landing. After a fierce engagement, in which Hastings fought at the rear of the transport group, the convoy passed downriver.

== Action at Fort Pillow, Tennessee ==
As the pace of Confederate attacks in Tennessee heightened, Hastings was sent to Fort Pillow, Tennessee, to protect it from capture, but was unable to get there in time to help the surrounded city and give assistance to USS Tyler, the only gunboat present. Arriving 14 April, however, Hastings shelled the woods in the area of the city. During this period, the veteran gunboat was acting as flagship for the resourceful commander of the 7th District, Mississippi Squadron, Lt. Comdr. S. L. Phelps. Subsequently, she operated in the White River, and in June 1864 cooperated with Major General Frederick Steele in his efforts to corner and defeat Confederate cavalry in the Tennessee and White River areas. Hastings patrolled the river, gained intelligence, and convoyed troops in cooperation with the Army.

The gunboat continued her service on the tributaries of the Mississippi River until returning to Cairo, Illinois, early in 1865.

== Post-war decommissioning, sale, and civilian career ==
She decommissioned 7 July 1865 and was sold at Mound City, Illinois, 17 August 1865 to Henry H. Semmes. Hastings was subsequently redocumented Dora in October 1865 and served as a river freighter until 1872.
