= Torreby =

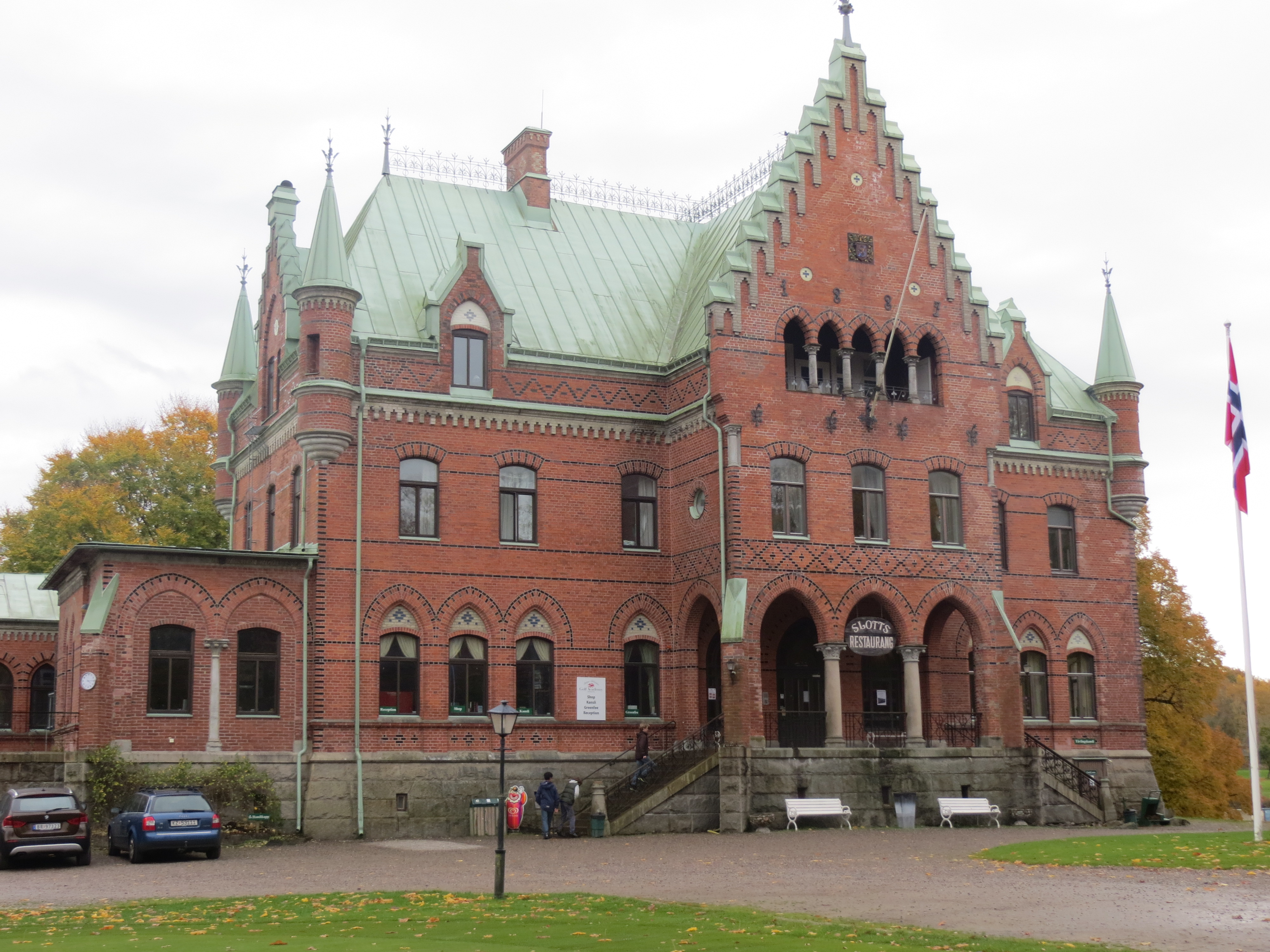
- Torreby Castle in Munkedal municipality, in Bohuslen (western Sweden)

- Location within Västra Götaland Location within Sweden
- Coordinates: 58°27′N 11°36′E
- Country: Sweden
- Province: Bohuslän
- County: Västra Götaland County
- Municipality: Munkedal Municipality

Area
  - Total: 0.31 km^{2} (0.12 sq mi)

Population (31 December 2010)
  - Total: 215
  - Density: 686/km^{2} (1,780/sq mi)
- Time zone: UTC+1 (CET)
  - Summer (DST): UTC+2 (CEST)

Torreby is a locality situated in Munkedal Municipality, Västra Götaland County, Sweden with 215 inhabitants in 2010.
