= Henry Von Phul (packet) =

19th century American sidewheel steamboat

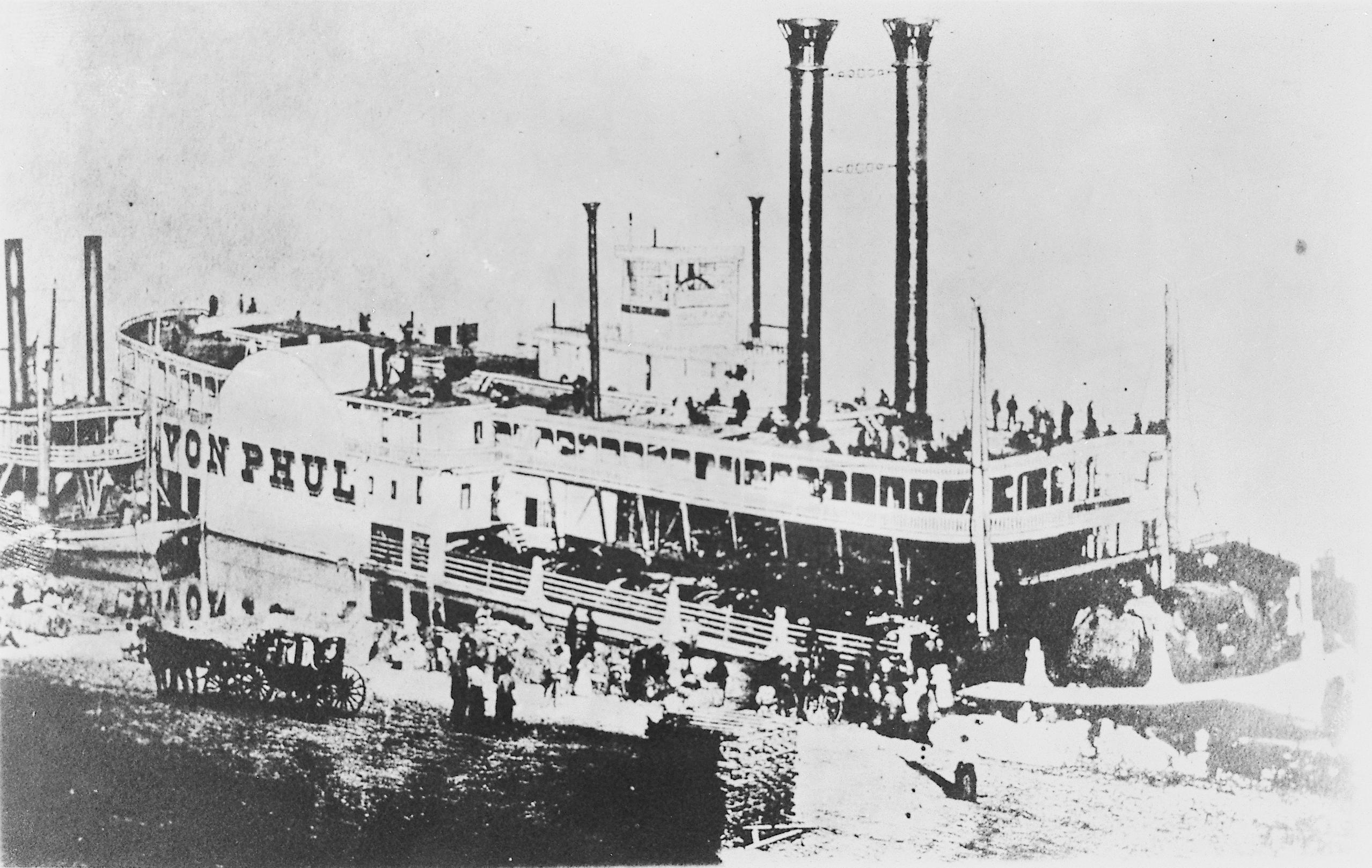
- Left side: Lady; right side: Henry Von Phul

History

United States
- Launched: 1860
- Acquired: c. 1863
- Decommissioned: before 1866
- Fate: Burned, November 29, 1866

General characteristics
- Displacement: 709 tons
- Propulsion: steam engine; side wheel-propelled

Henry Von Phul was an American 709-ton sidewheel steam packet built as a merchant and passenger vessel in Paducah, Kentucky and St. Louis, Missouri in 1860. During the Red River campaign of the Civil War she served as a Union transport on the Mississippi River and the Red River, and on December 8, 1863, she was twice heavily bombarded by Confederate guns. On November 15, 1866, she caught fire on the Mississippi with 3,800 bales of cotton and was run ashore near Donaldsonville, Louisiana.

== Military service ==
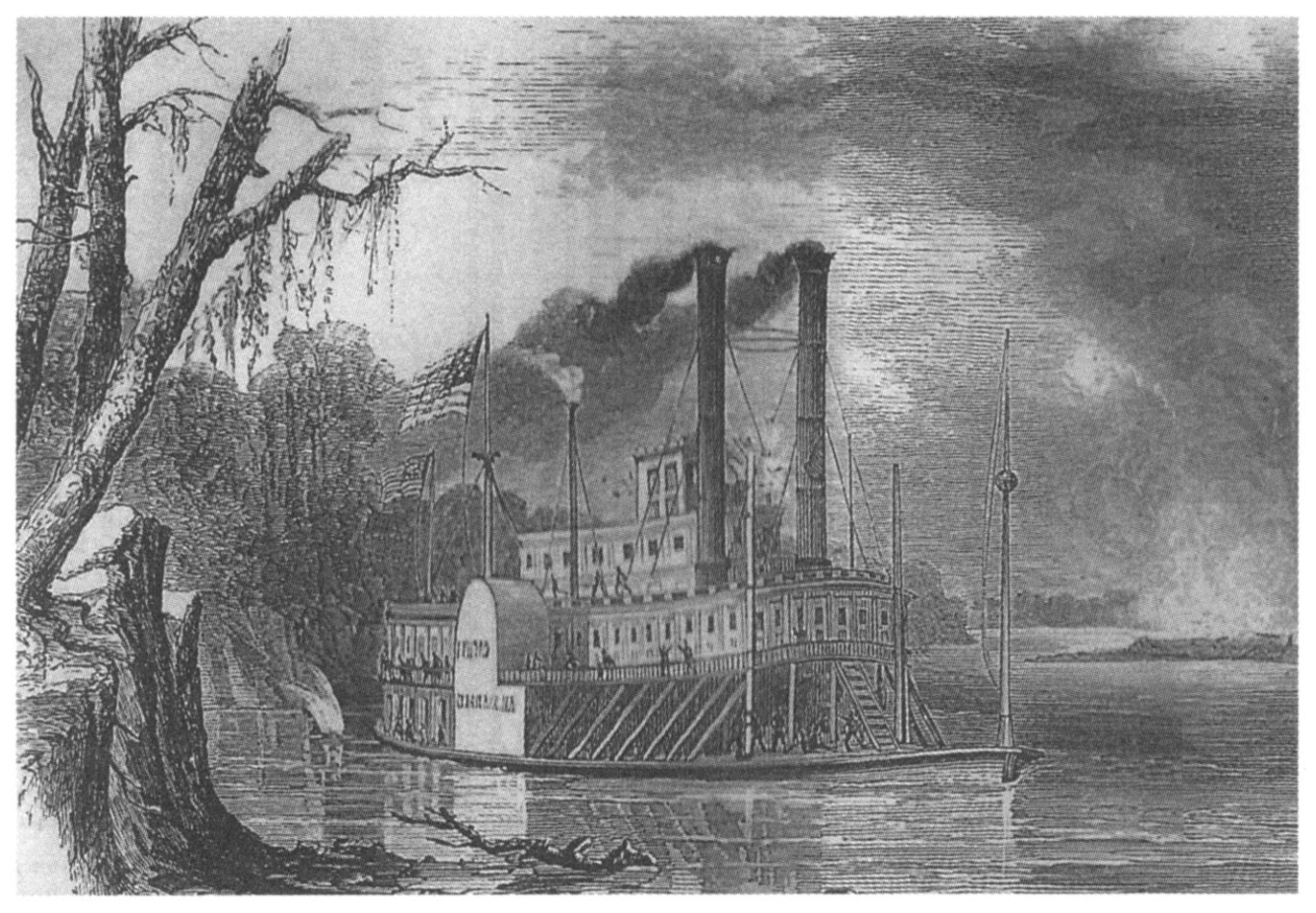
Henry Von Phul in low water.

On the morning of December 8, 1863, while en route to St. Louis from New Orleans, Von Phul was shelled by a Confederate shore battery of 6 guns about 5 miles (8 km) from Morganza. Captain Patrick Gorman, commanding, was killed by a shell which entered the pilot house, killing him instantly; a barkeeper and a deckhand were also mortally wounded. The damaged ship then made for the nearby Union anchorage off Morganza and was from there escorted by Neosho, a 523-ton river monitor. After continuing only a few miles, she was targeted again: this time by some 4 pieces of horse artillery which waited for the monitor to pass by them before firing on the transport from the levee; they struck Von Phul some twenty times, wounding nine and disabling the ship. Neosho turned to fire upon and scatter the gunners, and was supported by Signal. Meanwhile, Captain Harry McDougall's Atlantic, a 2,668-ton side-wheeler en route to New Orleans from St. Louis, came alongside the Von Phul, at considerable risk to herself, and towed the crippled transport to safety.

== Fate ==
The steamer Henry Von Phul, with 3,800 bales of cotton, burned at 3 a.m. on November 14, 1866, above Donaldsonville, Louisiana. The fire spread to the cotton from the pipe of a deck hand, and was soon under full headway. The boat was immediately run ashore. There were 101 persons aboard, including a number of women, nearly all of whom escaped ashore with the loss of all their baggage and clothes, many of them having only their night clothes. The boat was owned in Memphis, Tennessee, and was not insured.

== See also ==
- Steamboats of the Mississippi

== Bibliography ==
- Gibson, E. Kay; Gibson, Charles Dana (1995). Dictionary of Transports and Combatant Vessels, Steam and Sail, Employed by the Union Army 1861–1868. Camden, ME: Ensign Press. ISBN 0960899642.
- Marleau, Michael H. (2016). "'Cooling Our Bottom on the Sand Bars': A Chronicle of Low Water Trips on the Mississippi River, 1860". Mark Twain Journal. 54 (2): 150. JSTOR 44504982.
- Smith, Myron J. Jr. (2010). Tinclads in the Civil War: Union Light-Draught Gunboat Operations on Western Waters, 1862–1865. United States of America: McFarland & Company, Inc. pp. 154–5. ISBN 978-0-7864-5703-8.
- Civil War Naval Chronology, 1861–1865. Vol. 3–1863. Washington, D.C.: Navy Department. 1961–66. p. 163.
- "Henry Von Phul (Packet, 1860–1866)". University of Wisconsin–Madison.

=== Newspapers ===
- "From New Orleans". The Missouri Republican. November 14, 1866. p. 3.
- "The Henry Von Phul". The Daily Picayune. November 14, 1866. p. 1.
- "By Telegraph. The Noon Dispatches". Public Ledger. Memphis, TN. November 14, 1866. p. 2.
- "River Intelligence". The New Orleans Crescent. November 26, 1860. p. 3.
- "600 Bales, Bags and Loose Cotton, Saved". The Daily Picayune. November 26, 1866. p. 1.
- "New Orleans, Cairo and St. Louis". The Daily Picayune. December 7, 1860. p. 4.
- "The Daily Journal". The Evansville Daily Journal. December 19, 1863. p. 1.
