= HMS Mullett (1860) =

Gunvessel of the Royal Navy

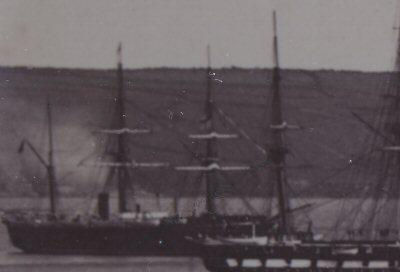
- HMS Pandora, sister ship to HMS Mullett

History

United Kingdom
- Name: HMS Mullett
- Ordered: 14 June 1859
- Builder: Charles Lungley, Rotherhithe
- Launched: 3 February 1860
- Commissioned: 30 April 1862
- Fate: Sold at Hong Kong on 25 April 1872

United Kingdom
- Name: Formosa
- Acquired: Purchased from the Royal Navy in 1872; Engines removed, converted to a sailing barque
- Fate: Purchased by the Government of Victoria in late 1880s as a blockship; Converted to a magazine in 1890

General characteristics
- Class & type: Philomel-class wooden screw gunvessel
- Displacement: 570 tons
- Length: 145 ft (44.2 m) oa; 127 ft 10.25 in (39.0 m) pp
- Beam: 25 ft 4 in (7.7 m)
- Depth of hold: 13 ft (3.96 m)
- Installed power: 355 ihp (265 kW)
- Propulsion: Single 2 cyl. horizontal single-expansion steam engine; Single screw
- Speed: 10 knots (19 km/h; 12 mph)
- Complement: 60
- Armament: One 68-pounder muzzle-loading smooth-bore gun; Two 24-pounder howitzers; Two 20-pounder breech-loading guns; Later: 68-pounder guns replaced by 7 in/110-pounder breech-loader

HMS Mullett (or Mullet) was a Royal Navy 5-gun Philomel-class wooden screw gunvessel launched in 1860. She served on the coast of West Africa and on the North America and West Indies Station before being sold in 1872 at Hong Kong for mercantile use. As the sailing ship Formosa she sailed in the Far East before being converted to a magazine in Melbourne.

== Design ==
The Philomel-class gunvessels were an enlargement of the earlier Algerine-class gunboats of 1856. The British Admiralty ordered the first pair of the class as "new style steam schooners" on 1 April 1857; a further order for three took place on 27 March 1858. A sixth was ordered on 8 April 1859. The naval dockyards constructed all six; all were re-classified as second-class gunvessels on 8 June 1859.

The Admiralty ordered a further twelve of the class on 14 June 1859 with this new classification, including the Mullett, and they received their names on 24 September. They were constructed of wood in contract yards and then fitted out at naval dockyards. A final eight were later ordered from the naval dockyards, although six of these were subsequently cancelled.

== Construction and career ==
Mullett was laid down at the Rotherhithe yard of Charles Lungley on 29 June 1859 and launched on 3 February 1860. She was fitted with a Robert Napier & Sons two-cylinder horizontal single-expansion steam engine driving a single screw and developing 355 indicated horsepower (265 kW).

She was fitted out at Deptford Dockyard, and this would have included her armament of a 68-pounder 95 cwt muzzle-loading smooth-bore gun, two 24-pounder howitzers and two 20-pounder breech-loading guns. All ships of the class later had the 68-pounder replaced by a 7-inch/110-pounder breech-loading gun. The class were fitted with a barque-rigged sail plan.

=== West Africa (1862–1866) ===
After commissioning at Sheerness on 30 April 1862, she sailed for the West Africa Squadron under the command of Commander Cortland Herbert Simpson. She stayed there for a number of years and participated in at least one punitive expedition.

On an evening in October 1862, open mutiny broke out in the Gold Coast Artillery Corps at Cape Coast. The authorities dispatched Mullett to Accra to forestall a similar outbreak. There was no loss of life. Although 80 mutineers were court martialled and two were sentenced to death, their sentences were commuted.

On 28 June 1866, Mullett, under Captain Robinson, and in company with the small colonial steamer Dover, landed a force of about 400 British troops under Colonel D'Arcy, primarily from the West India Regiment, at Bathurst in the Gambia. The force, joined by local allies, stormed a Marabout stronghold after Mullett had ineffectively shelled the stockade with her 68-pounder for four hours. The British suffered several dead in their attack.

=== North America and West Indies Station (1867–1870) ===
From 7 November 1867 Commander Edward Kelly commanded Mullett on the North America and West Indies Station. In 1869, while the ship was in Jamaica, Able Seaman William Wardell won a Royal Humane Society Bronze Medal for saving the life on 10 June of Robert Cleal, an armourer of Terror. Cleal had fallen overboard and Wardell jumped in, holding Cleal above water until a lifebuoy was thrown to him. Cleal was unconscious when brought aboard Mullett but was revived. Mullett paid off at Sheerness on 19 July 1870.

=== Mercantile service (1872–1890) ===
The Admiralty sold her in Hong Kong on 25 April 1872 for mercantile use. She had her engines removed by W Walker & Co of London, converting her to a barque-rigged sailing vessel. Under the name Formosa she made several voyages to the Antipodes.

Ultimately she was purchased at Melbourne. Then during the Russian war scare in the late 1880s, the government of Victoria bought several old vessels, including Formosa as blockships for the south and west channels. The scare passed and in 1890 the government converted Formosa to a magazine.

== Bibliography ==
- Colledge, J. J.; Warlow, Ben (2006) [1969]. Ships of the Royal Navy: The Complete Record of All Fighting Ships of the Royal Navy from the 15th Century to the Present (3rd Rev ed.). London: Chatham Publishing. ISBN 978-1-86176-281-8. OCLC 67375475.
- De Graft-Johnson, John Coleman (1986) African glory: the story of vanished Negro civilizations.(Baltimore, MD: Black Classic Press).
- "An Historic Vessel", Evening Post, Rōrahi XXXIX, Putanga 82, 9 Paengawhāwhā 1890, Page 3
- Lyon, David & Winfield, Rif (2004). The Sail and Steam Navy List: All the Ships of the Royal Navy 1815–1889. Chatham Publishing. ISBN 978-1-86176-032-6. OCLC 52620555.
