= USS Donegal =

Union Navy steamship

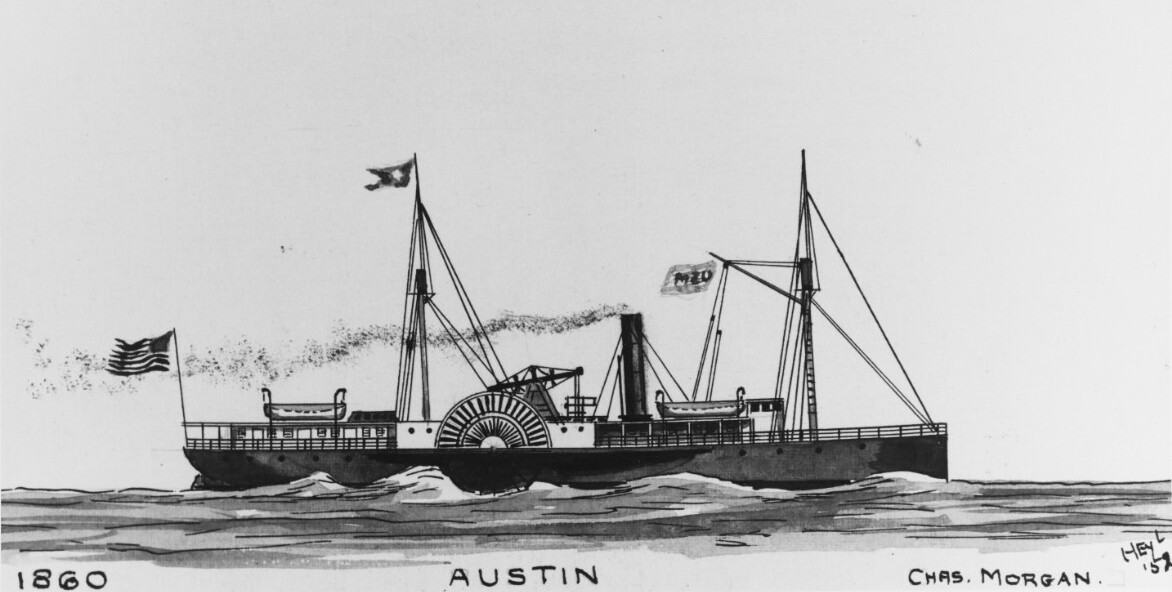
- Watercolor of the ship as the merchant Austin by Erik Heyl

History

United States
- Name: USS Donegal
- Laid down: date unknown
- Launched: 1860
- Commissioned: 3 September 1864
- Decommissioned: 8 September 1865
- Stricken: 1865 (est.)
- Captured: Captured by the Union Navy, 6 June 1864
- Fate: Sold, 27 September 1865

General characteristics
- Type: Steamer
- Displacement: 1,080 long tons (1,100 t)
- Length: 200 ft (61 m)
- Beam: 36 ft (11 m)
- Draft: 8 ft (2.4 m)
- Propulsion: Steam engine, side-wheel propelled
- Speed: 10 kn (12 mph; 19 km/h)
- Complement: 130
- Armament: 2 × 30-pounder rifles, 2 × 12-pounder smoothbore guns

USS Donegal was a captured Confederate steamship acquired by the Union Navy from the prize court during the American Civil War. She was put into service by the Union Navy to patrol navigable waterways of the Confederacy to prevent the South from trading with other countries.

== Capture of the vessel, conversion to Union Navy use ==
Donegal — a large sidewheel steamer, was built in 1860 at Wilmington, Delaware, and used as a Confederate blockade runner, occasionally carrying the name Austin. She was captured on 6 June 1864 off Mobile Bay by Metacomet; sent to Philadelphia for condemnation; purchased by the Navy and fitted for sea at Philadelphia Navy Yard; and commissioned on 3 September 1864, Acting Volunteer Lieutenant W. H. West in command.

== Assigned to carry cargo to the South Atlantic Blockade ==
Donegal stood down the Delaware River after her commissioning for Charleston, South Carolina, with supplies and a large number of officers and men for ships of the South Atlantic Blockading Squadron. She returned to Philadelphia on 16 September, and from 24 September-12 December made four similar voyages.

== Rescuing the crew of the sinking McDonough ==
Later, in 1865, she patrolled the coasts of South Carolina and Georgia until 20 August, when she sailed for New York City, arriving four days later. She rescued the crew of USS Commodore McDonough which sank on the 23rd while being towed to New York.

== End-of-war decommissioning and sale ==
Donegal was decommissioned on 8 September 1865 and sold on 27 September.
