= USS Sallie Wood =

Tugboat of the United States Navy

History

United States
- Launched: 1860
- In service: 8 February 1862
- Captured: captured by Union Navy forces; 8 February 1862
- Fate: Sunk, 21 July 1862

General characteristics
- Displacement: 256 tons
- Propulsion: steam engine; side wheel-propelled

USS Sallie Wood was a 256-ton steamer captured by the Union Navy during the early years of the American Civil War.

She assigned by the Union Navy during the blockade of ports and waterways of the Confederate States of America to a number of duties: as a tugboat, a dispatch boat, a troopship, and as an ammunition ship, mostly on the Mississippi River and its tributaries.

== Service history ==
Sallie Wood was a wooden steamer built in 1860 at Paducah, Kentucky. Early in the Civil War, she was acquired by the Confederate government and used as a troop transport on the Mississippi River and its tributaries.

After a Union naval force under Flag Officer Foote captured Fort Henry, Tennessee, on 6 February 1862, Lt. S. L. Phelps, in USS Conestoga, led gunboats, USS Tyler and USS Lexington, up the Tennessee River seeking Confederate shipping. On the 8th, they seized steamers, Sallie Wood and Muscle. The former was laden with iron intended for shipment to Richmond, Virginia. Moreover, the sweep of the Union gunboats had compelled retreating Confederate forces to burn three other Southern vessels lest they be captured.

In returning down stream, Muscle sprang a leak and sank; but Sallie Wood descended safely and was taken into the Western Flotilla for service as a transport, a tugboat, and an ammunition ship. While steaming along the navigable branches of the Mississippi River, Sallie Wood occasionally braved fire from masked riverside batteries. In July, as she ascended the Mississippi carrying sick soldiers, she was fired upon by Confederate cannon concealed ashore at Carolina Landing, at Princeton, and at other points above.

On the 21 July, attacks on the steamer were made from Argyle Landing and from Island No. 82. A shot during the latter ambush pierced her steam drum and left her dead in the water. Her pilot used the current to run her aground on the island, but the cannonade continued until all of the side wheeler's officers, crew, and passengers had been forced to leave the ship. The Confederates later removed whatever they could salvage and burned the steamer to her waterline.

== See also ==
- Anaconda Plan
