= HMS Nimble (1860) =

Wooden second-class gunvessel of the Royal Navy

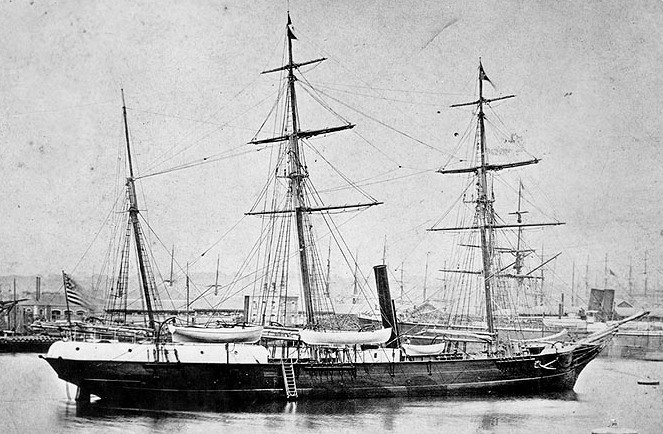
- Nimble's sister ship Jeanette (ex-HMS Pandora) at Le Havre in 1878

History

United Kingdom
- Name: HMS Nimble
- Ordered: 27 March 1858
- Builder: Pembroke Dockyard, Wales
- Laid down: 30 October 1859
- Launched: 15 September 1860
- Commissioned: 8 April 1861
- Fate: Harbour service 1879; RNR training ship at Hull 1885; Sold to W R James on 10 July 1906

General characteristics
- Displacement: 570 tons
- Length: 145 ft (44.2 m) oa; 127 ft 10.25 in (39.0 m) pp
- Beam: 25 ft 4 in (7.7 m)
- Depth of hold: 13 ft (3.96 m)
- Installed power: 334 ihp (249 kW)
- Propulsion: Single 2-cyl. horizontal single-expansion steam engine by A & J Inglis; Single screw
- Speed: 9.9 knots (18 km/h)
- Complement: 60
- Armament: One 68-pdr muzzle-loading smooth-bore gun; Two 24-pdr howitzers; Two 20-pdr breech-loading guns

HMS Nimble was a wooden Philomel-class gunvessel of the Royal Navy. She was equipped with 5 guns. She became a drill ship for the Royal Naval Reserve at Hull in 1885 and was disposed of in 1906.

== History ==
HMS Nimble was launched on 15 September 1860 from the Pembroke Dockyard. In 1861 she was commanded by Lieutenant John D'Arcy on the North America and West Indies Station as a tender to HMS Nile. On 1 October 1866, she was blown ashore in a hurricane at Nassau, The Bahamas. Commander Frederick William Lee was in command of Nimble from 19 October 1870 to 4 December 1871 and employed at Zanzibar in the suppression of the slave trade. She was placed in harbour service in 1879, and became a Royal Naval Reserve training ship at Hull in 1885.

She was sold to W. R. James on 10 July 1906.

== Bibliography ==
- Lyon, David & Winfield, Rif (2004). The Sail and Steam Navy List: All the Ships of the Royal Navy 1815–1889. Chatham Publishing. ISBN 978-1-86176-032-6. OCLC 52620555.
