= HMS Griffon (1860) =

Royal Navy Philomel-class gunvessel

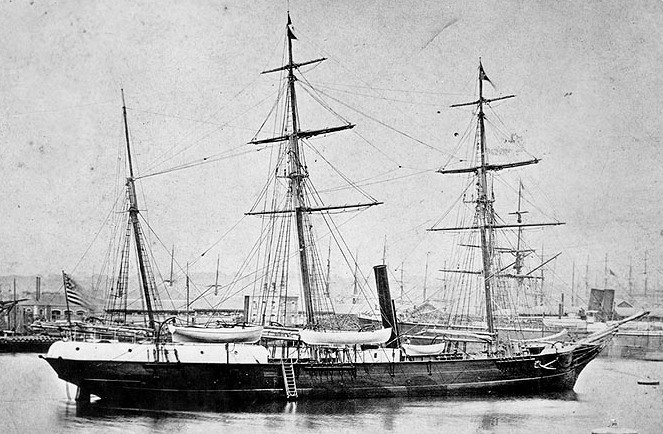
- Pandora at Le Havre; another ship of the Philomel-class

History

United Kingdom
- Name: HMS Griffon
- Builder: Northfleet
- Launched: 1860
- Fate: Accidentally rammed and sank; 2 October 1866

General characteristics
- Class & type: Philomel-class gunvessel
- Type: Wooden screw gunvessel
- Displacement: 570 long tons
- Tons burthen: 428 tons (bm)
- Length: 142 ft (43 m)
- Installed power: ~325 horsepower
- Propulsion: Single 2-cyl. horizontal single-expansion steam engine
- Sail plan: Bark-rigge
- Speed: ± 10 knots (12 mph; 19 km/h)
- Complement: 60 officers and men
- Armament: 1 × 68-pdr, 2 × 24-pdr howitzers, 2 × 20-pdr breech-loading guns

HMS Griffon was a Philomel-class gunvessel that served in the Royal Navy of the United Kingdom from 1860 to 1866. The steam-powered ship, built by Northfleet, was launched on 25 February 1860 as part of the Philomel-class; she was intended to succeed the Intrepid-class gunvessel.

The Griffon was lost on 2 October 1866 when she accidentally collided with HMS Pandora, which would later become the USS Jeannette, off the coast of Little Popo (now Aného), Togo. The crews of both vessels were rescued; the Pandora was transferred to the reserve before returning to active service the next year and later being sold to Allen Young.

An inquiry was conducted into the loss of the Griffon and Commander Stubbs of the Pandora was court martialed for his part in the incident. In 1867, the Naval and Military Gazette described the findings of the commission: "The proper signal to the Griffon was 'Tack immediately!'... but behold! there [sic] is no such signal in the night-signal book, and it cannot be made." Due to this issue, the officer on the Griffon attempted to use the daytime signal. It was misinterpreted by those aboard the Pandora, leading to the collision.

The Gazette concluded that "more than five years ago, Commander Colomb invented a system of signals fully available for all purposes...which superseded with the greatest benefit the old system. The loss of the Griffon is, in short, but another page of the old story- resistance to improvement by the Board of Admiralty." Colomb's system, which utilized burning lime and was already utilized by the Navy's Channel Fleet, was adopted by the rest of the Royal Navy the same year. Stubbs was subsequently "placed at the bottom of the list of Commanders, and...dismissed [from] his ship."
