= Philomel-class gunvessel =

1860 class of woof hulled British gunboats

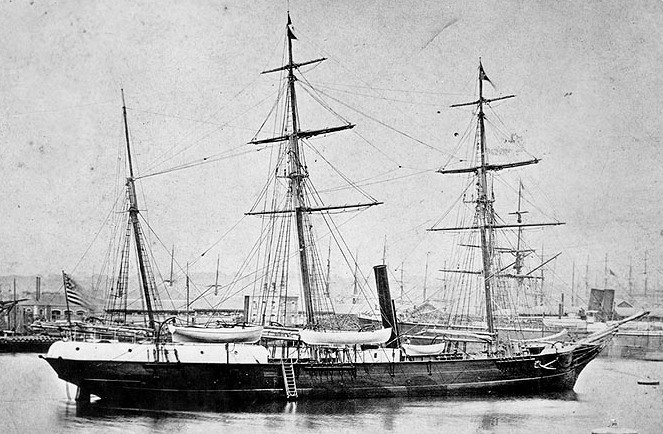
- Jeanette (the former HMS Pandora) at Le Havre in 1878

Class overview
- Operators: Royal Navy
- Preceded by: Intrepid-class gunvessel
- Succeeded by: Cormorant-class gunvessel
- Built: 1859 - 1867
- In commission: 1860 - 1906
- Completed: 20
- Canceled: 6

General characteristics
- Type: Wooden screw gunvessel
- Displacement: 570 tons
- Length: 145 ft (44.2 m) oa; 127 ft 10.25 in (39.0 m) pp
- Beam: 25 ft 4 in (7.7 m)
- Depth of hold: 13 ft (3.96 m)
- Installed power: About 325 ihp (242 kW)
- Propulsion: Single 2-cyl. horizontal single-expansion steam engine; Single screw
- Sail plan: As designed: Schooner (or "gunboat") rig; Later: Often a barquentine or barque rig
- Speed: About 9.5 knots (18 km/h)
- Complement: 60
- Armament: One 68-pdr muzzle-loading smooth-bore gun; Two 24-pdr howitzers; Two 20-pdr breech-loading guns

The Philomel-class gunvessel was a class of wooden-hulled screw-driven second-class gunvessels built for the Royal Navy between 1859 and 1867, of which 26 were ordered but only 20 completed. They had a mixed history, with some serving for as little as 5 years, and others surviving into the 1880s. Two of the class were sold and used as Arctic exploration vessels, both eventually being lost in the ice.

== Design ==
The Philomel-class gunvessels were an enlargement of the earlier Algerine-class gunboat of 1856. The first pair of the class were ordered as "new style steam schooners" on 1 April 1857, another three were ordered on 27 March 1858 and a sixth on 8 April 1859; all were built in the naval dockyards. All six were re-classified as second-class gunvessels on 8 June 1859.

With this new classification, a further twelve of the class were ordered by the Admiralty on 14 June 1859, receiving their names on 24 September the same year. They were constructed of wood in contract yards and then fitted out at naval dockyards. Another six of the class were ordered on 5 March 1860 for construction in naval dockyards, with a final pair ordered in 1861. Of these final eight, six were subsequently cancelled, and one, Newport was suspended for 4 years.

=== Propulsion ===
The Philomel class were fitted with a two-cylinder horizontal single-expansion steam engine and a single screw (Ranger had a single-trunk engine). The engine, which was produced by a range of contractors, including George Rennie & Sons and Robert Napier and Sons, was intended to produce a nominal horsepower of 80nhp, which equated to about 325 indicated horsepower (242 kW). This was sufficient for a speed under steam alone of about 9.5 knots (17.6 km/h).

=== Sailing rig ===
The class were fitted with a barque-rigged sail plan.

=== Armament ===
Ships of the class were armed with a 68-pounder 95 cwt muzzle-loading smooth-bore gun, two 24-pounder howitzers and two 20-pounder breech-loading guns. All ships of the class later had the 68-pounder replaced by a 7-inch/110-pounder breech-loading gun.

== Ships ==
Name	Ship Builder	Ordered	Launched	Fate
Ranger	Deptford Dockyard	1 April 1857	26 November 1859	Sold to Messrs. Isaacs on 3 November 1869
Espoir	Pembroke Dockyard	1 April 1857	7 January 1860	Became dredger YC19 in 1869, later to Bermuda where she was broken up in June 1881
Landrail	Deptford Dockyard	27 March 1858	27 March 1860	Sold for mercantile use in September 1869, and renamed Walrus. Wrecked in October 1876 on Black Island, Newfoundland Colony.
Nimble	Pembroke Dockyard	27 March 1858	15 September 1860	Harbour service in 1879. RNR training ship at Hull in 1885. Sold to W R James on 10 July 1906
Speedwell	Deptford Dockyard	27 March 1858	12 February 1861	Broken up at Chatham in July 1876
Pandora	Pembroke Dockyard	8 April 1859	7 February 1861	Sold for Arctic Exploration on 13 January 1875 and renamed USS Jeannette in 1881. Crushed by ice on 13 June 1881
Lee	Money Wigram & Sons, Blackwall Yard	14 June 1859	25 January 1860	Breaking completed at Sheerness on 20 March 1875
Dart	C J Mare & Company, Leamouth	14 June 1859	10 March 1860	Renamed Kangaroo on 1 April 1882. Broken up in December 1884
Snipe	J Scott Russell, Millwall	14 June 1859	5 May 1860	Broken up at Sheerness in May 1868
Sparrow	J Scott Russell, Millwall	14 June 1859	7 July 1860	Broken up by Marshall at Plymouth in 1868
Torch	R & H Green, Blackwall Yard	14 June 1859	24 December 1859	Broken up at Malta in September 1881
Plover	R & H Green, Blackwall Yard	14 June 1859	19 January 1860	Sold as a merchant vessel on 12 September 1865, renamed Hawk, and wrecked in 1876
Penguin	William Cowley Miller, Toxteth Dock, Liverpool	14 June 1859	8 February 1860	Sold to Lethbridge & Drew for breaking on 26 February 1870
Steady	William Cowley Miller, Toxteth Dock, Liverpool	14 June 1859	8 February 1860	Sold to W & T Jolliffe on 12 May 1870
Cygnet	Money Wigram & Company, Northam	14 June 1859	6 June 1860	Broken up at Portsmouth in August 1868
Griffon	William Pitcher, Northfleet	14 June 1859	25 February 1860	Collided with Pandora off Little Popo in West Africa on 2 October 1866 and stranded
Mullett	Charles Lungley, Rotherhithe	14 June 1859	3 February 1860	Sold at Hong Kong for mercantile use on 25 April 1872, renamed Formosa
Philomel	J. & R. White, Cowes	14 June 1859	10 March 1860	Sold back to White, Cowes, for breaking on 2 June 1865
Newport	Pembroke Dockyard	5 March 1860	20 July 1867	Suspended during 1862/63. Survey ship in April 1868. Sold for mercantile use in May 1881, renamed Blencathra; subsequently wrecked on 11 June 1881 but salved. Renamed Pandora in 1899 and sold in 1912 to Georgy Brusilov for his ill-fated Arctic expedition. Renamed Svyataya Anna and lost in the Arctic between sometime after 1914.
Alban	Deptford Dockyard	5 March 1860		Suspended during 1862/63 and cancelled on 12 December 1863
Jaseur	Deptford Dockyard	5 March 1860	15 May 1862	Sold to the Commissioners of Irish Lights in December 1874
Humber	Pembroke Dockyard	5 March 1860		Cancelled on 12 December 1863
Undine	Deptford Dockyard	5 March 1860		Cancelled on 12 December 1863
Rye	Pembroke Dockyard	5 March 1860		Cancelled on 12 December 1863 (never laid down)
Portia	Deptford Dockyard	1861		Cancelled on 12 December 1863 (never started)
Discovery	Deptford Dockyard	1861		Cancelled on 12 December 1863 (never started)
