= List of shipwrecks in May 1863 =

The list of shipwrecks in May 1863 includes ships sunk, foundered, grounded, or otherwise lost during May 1863.

== 1 May ==
List of shipwrecks: 1 May 1863
Ship	State	Description
Dreadnought	United Kingdom	The ship ran aground at Sligo. She was on a voyage from Dublin to Sligo.
Princess Royal	United Kingdom	The ship was abandoned in ice off the coast of British North America. Sixteen of her crew were rescued by Union (United Kingdom). Princess Royal was on a voyage from Liverpool, Lancashire to Halifax, Nova Scotia, British North America.
Rose	United Kingdom	The ship ran aground and sank at Abbeville, Somme, France. She was on a voyage from Abbeville to Sunderland, County Durham. She was refloated the next day. Following temporary repairs, she sailed on 9 May for Sunderland.
Two unidentified schooners	Confederate States of America	American Civil War, Union blockade: A boat expedition from the armed screw steamers USS Western World and USS Crusader (both United States Navy) burned the schooners, which were aground and full of water on the York River at Milford Haven, Virginia.

== 2 May ==
List of shipwrecks: 2 May 1863
Ship	State	Description
Eleemosnya	Flag unknown	The ship ran aground on the Longsand, in the North Sea off the coast of Essex, United Kingdom and was abandoned. She was on a voyage from Ghent, East Flanders, Belgium to Dublin, United Kingdom.
Escort	United Kingdom	The brigantine was holed by ice and abandoned in the Atlantic Ocean. Her seventeen crew were rescued by the barque William Fisher (United Kingdom). Escort was on a voyage from Greenock, Renfrewshire to Boston, Massachusetts, United States.

== 3 May ==
List of shipwrecks: 3 May 1863
Ship	State	Description
George Sturgess	United States	American Civil War: The 47-ton screw tug and the two barges she was towing were set afire on the Mississippi River by Confederate artillery firing from Vicksburg, Mississippi, Confederate States of America.
Jasper	United Kingdom	The schooner was abandoned in the North Sea. Her five crew were rescued by the schooner Pilin (Norway). Jasper was on a voyage from Rostock to Dundee, Forfarshire.
Minnesota	United States	American Civil War: The 142-ton sternwheel towboat was towing three barges – one carrying sutler′s stores and the other two loaded with coal – when she was captured by Confederate forces on the Mississippi River at Argyle Landing, 3 miles (4.8 km) above Greenville, Mississippi. The Confederates destroyed her and all three barges.
Sea Lark	United States	American Civil War, CSS Alabama's South Atlantic Expeditionary Raid: The 973-ton clipper, bound from Boston, Massachusetts or New York to San Francisco, California, with general cargo, was captured and burned in the Atlantic Ocean near Bahia, Brazil, (9°39′S 32°44′W) by the screw sloop-of-war CSS Alabama (Confederate States Navy).
Union Jack	United States	American Civil War, CSS Alabama's South Atlantic Expeditionary Raid: The 483-ton barque, bound from Boston, Massachusetts, for Shanghai, China, with general cargo and six passengers, was captured and burned in the Atlantic Ocean near Bahia (9°40′S 32°30′W) by the screw sloop-of-war CSS Alabama (Confederate States Navy).

== 4 May ==
List of shipwrecks: 4 May 1863
Ship	State	Description
Albertus	United Kingdom	The schooner was abandoned in the Atlantic Ocean. Her crew were rescued by the full-rigged ship Coleroon (United Kingdom). Alburtus was on a voyage from Cardiff, Glamorgan to Lisbon, Portugal.
Surprise	United States	The 456-ton sidewheel paddle steamer was destroyed by fire after colliding with Hu Quang (China) on the Yangtze River.

== 5 May ==
List of shipwrecks: 5 May 1863
Ship	State	Description
Anna Catharina	Denmark	The schooner ran aground on the Barber Sand, in the North Sea off the coast of Norfolk, United Kingdom.
Sallie List	United States	The 212-ton sternwheel paddle steamer struck a snag and sank in the Missouri River 5 nautical miles (9.3 km) above Kickapoo, Kansas. She was refloated, repaired, and returned to service.
Talisman	United States	American Civil War: The medium clipper was captured by CSS Alabama (Confederate States Navy). Talisman was set afire and sunk. She was on a voyage from New York to Shanghai, China.
Zephyr	Norway	The ship was wrecked on the Agger Sand, off the coast of Denmark. Her crew were rescued. She was on a voyage from Newcastle upon Tyne, Northumberland, United Kingdom to Dram.

== 6 May ==
List of shipwrecks: 6 May 1863
Ship	State	Description
Commodore	United Kingdom	The ship ran aground on The Platters, in the Irish Sea off the coast of Anglesey. She was on a voyage from Liverpool, Lancashire to Youghal, County Cork. She consequently put in to Holyhead, Anglesey in a leaky condition.
Emily Farnum	United Kingdom	The ship ran aground in the Hooghly River. She was on a voyage from Liverpool to Calcutta, India. She was refloated and taken in to Calcutta in a leaky condition.
Fanny Taylor	United Kingdom	The ship ran aground in the Belfast Lough. She was on a voyage from Maryport, Cumberland to Ballyshannon, County Donegal.
Mabel	United Kingdom	The brig sank at Saint Petersburg, Russia. She was refloated on 23 May and subsequently returned to service.
Majestic	United States	The 648-ton sidewheel paddle steamer burned on the Mississippi River at Island Number Eight near Hickman, Kentucky.

== 7 May ==
List of shipwrecks: 7 May 1863
Ship	State	Description
Duchess of Leinster	United Kingdom	The ship was destroyed by fire at Tobago.
Respigadera	United Kingdom	The barque was wrecked at Cape Three Points, on the coast of Patagonia, Argentina. Her fourteen crew survived; seven of them reached land, the rest were rescued by the schooner Tilton (United States). Respigadera was on a voyage from Liverpool, Lancashire to Callao, Peru.

== 8 May ==
List of shipwrecks: 8 May 1863
Ship	State	Description
Eclipse	United Kingdom	The schooner ran aground on the Cross Sand, in the North Sea off the coast of Norfolk. She was on a voyage from Shoreham-by-Sea, Sussex to the River Tyne. She was refloated and resumed her voyage.
Grace Ross	United Kingdom	The ship was driven ashore at Pegu, Burma. She was on a voyage from Rangoon, Burma to Liverpool, Lancashire. She was refloated and subsequently resumed her voyage.
Ringleader	United States	The steamship was wrecked on the Formosa Banks, in the South China Sea with the loss of two of her crew. The wreck was plundered by local fishing boats. She was on a voyage from Hong Kong to San Francisco, California.
Sophia	United States	American Civil War, Union blockade: Disabled by a storm in the North Atlantic Ocean after being captured by the schooner USS Dan Smith (United States Navy), the schooner was abandoned at 38°30′N 69°00′W by her United States Navy prize crew, which was taken aboard the barque Aurora (Italy). The abandoned wreck of Sophia was found later aground on Egg Island, Georgia.
Whitehall	United Kingdom	The ship caught fire at sea. She was on a voyage from London to Sydney, New South Wales. The fire was extinguished.

== 9 May ==
List of shipwrecks: 9 May 1863
Ship	State	Description
City of Brisbane	United Kingdom	The ship departed from Calais, France for a British port. No further trace, presumed foundered with the loss of all hands.
Portland	United Kingdom	The barque was abandoned in ice off the coast of British North America and set afire. Her crew survived. She was on a voyage from Liverpool, Lancashire to Quebec City, Province of Canada, British North America.

== 10 May ==
List of shipwrecks: 10 May 1863
Ship	State	Description
Gazelle	United Kingdom	The schooner ran aground on the North Bank, in Liverpool Bay. She was on a voyage from Liverpool, Lancashire to Donegal. She was refloated on 12 May and put back to Liverpool.
Hanover	Confederate States of America	American Civil War, Union blockade: The schooner was chased ashore and burned by boat crews from the gunboats USS Owasco and USS Katahdin (both United States Navy) near Galveston, Texas.
Svea	Norway	The schooner was wrecked on Læsø, Denmark. She was on a voyage from Newcastle upon Tyne, Northumberland, United Kingdom to Lysekil.
USS Wyoming	United States Navy	The screw sloop ran aground at Yokohama, Japan. She was refloated the next day and taken in to Yokohama.

== 11 May ==
List of shipwrecks: 11 May 1863
Ship	State	Description
Levant	United Kingdom	The brig ran aground in the Rock Channel and was abandoned by her nine crew, who were rescued by the New Brighton Lifeboat. Her pilot remained on board. She was on a voyage from Barbados to Liverpool, Lancashire. She was refloated with assistance from the tug Universe (United Kingdom) and taken in to Liverpool.
Surinam	United Kingdom	The ship departed from Trinidad for the Clyde. No further trace, presumed foundered with the loss of all hands.

== 12 May ==
List of shipwrecks: 12 May 1863
Ship	State	Description
Friedrich	Kolberg	The barque was driven ashore on Skagen, Denmark. She was on a voyage from Sunderland, County Durham, United Kingdom to Kolberg. She had been refloated by 16 May and taken in to Fredrikshavn, Denmark in a severely leaky condition.
Hesse Darstadt	United Kingdom	The barque was wrecked on the Salt Key. She was on a voyage from Havana, Cuba to South Shields, County Durham. She was later refloated.
Mantura	United Kingdom	The ship was wrecked on Skyros, Greece. .
Prins Gustav	Sweden	The ship was driven ashore and wrecked at Malmö. Her crew were rescued.
Thomas	United Kingdom	The ship was lost in ice in the Atlantic Ocean with the loss of five of her nine crew. She was on a voyage from London to Quebec City, Province of Canada, British North America.
Wentworth	United Kingdom	The barque was wrecked on Salt Key Her crew were rescued by the brig Loranna (United Kingdom). Wentworth was on a voyage from Jamaica to London.
Unidentified schooner	Flag unknown	American Civil War, Union blockade: The schooner was destroyed at Murrells Inlet, South Carolina, Confederate States of America, by the gunboat USS Conemaugh (United States Navy) and other United States Navy ships.

== 13 May ==
List of shipwrecks: 13 May 1863
Ship	State	Description
Alma	Norway	The brig was wrecked in Brixton Bay. She was refloated on 1 June and towed in to Southampton, Hampshire, United Kingdom.
Crown Point	United States	American Civil War: During a voyage from New York to San Francisco, California, with assorted cargo, the clipper was captured and burned in the Atlantic Ocean off the coast of Brazil by the screw sloop-of-war CSS Florida (Confederate States Navy).
CSS J. F. Pargoud	Confederate States Navy	American Civil War: The 338- or 522-ton sidewheel paddle steamer was scuttled by Confederate forces in the Yazoo River adjacent to Fort Pemberton, Mississippi to prevent her capture by Union forces. The Confederates burned the wreck on 14 July.
Dawn of Hope	United Kingdom	The ship was sighted whilst on a voyage from Bombay, India to Liverpool, Lancashire. No further trace, presumed foundered with the loss of all hands.

== 14 May ==
List of shipwrecks: 14 May 1863
Ship	State	Description
Albion	United Kingdom	The schooner struck the Revel Stone, in the Baltic Sea and sank. Her crew were rescued by the steamship Albion (United Kingdom). The schooner was on a voyage from Sunderland, County Durham to Kronstadt, Russia.
Agusta	United Kingdom	The brig foundered. A message in a bottle washed up at Newhaven, Sussex on 1 September gave the news.
Arica	United Kingdom	The brigantine sank off South Uist, Outer Hebrides. Her crew were rescued. She was on a voyage from Newcastle upon Tyne, Northumberland to Limerick.

== 15 May ==
List of shipwrecks: 15 May 1863
Ship	State	Description
Amelia	Confederate States of America	American Civil War, Union blockade: The schooner was abandoned and sank in the North Atlantic Ocean after colliding with another prize ship and springing a serious leak during a storm while under tow off Cape Hatteras, North Carolina. The schooner Halitia (United Kingdom) rescued her crew. The screw steamer USS Flag (United States Navy) had captured Amelia when she attempted to run the Union blockade at Charleston, South Carolina, with a cargo of cotton on 8 May.
Benediction de Dieu	France	The ship was wrecked at Bexhill-on-Sea, Sussex, United Kingdom. Her crew were rescued by the Coast Guard. She was on a voyage from Havre de Grâce, Seine-Inférieure to Dunkirk, Nord.
Eleanor Stephenson	United Kingdom	The ship departed Quebec City, Province of Canada, British North America for Liverpool, Lancashire. No further trace, presumed foundered with the loss of all hands.
Iron Crown	United Kingdom	The ship ran aground on the James and Mary Sandbank, in the Hooghly River. She was on a voyage from Calcutta, India to a port in China. She was refloated and resumed her voyage.
Leipzig	United Kingdom	The steamship ran aground on the Fahludd Reef, in the Baltic Sea. She was on a voyage from Riga, Russia to Hartlepool, County Durham. She was refloated and resumed her voyage.
Marie de Brabant	Belgium	The steamship collided with the steamship Amalia (United Kingdom) and sank in the Mediterranean Sea (37°22′N 4°47′E) with the loss of five of her 26 crew. Survivors were rescued by Amalia. Marie de Brabant was on a voyage from Gibraltar to Alicante, Spain and Malta.
Perseverant	France	The brig was wrecked on Barbuda. She was on a voyage from Macao, China to Havana, Cuba.

== 16 May ==
List of shipwrecks: 16 May 1863
Ship	State	Description
Alice Maud	United Kingdom	The ship was abandoned in the Indian Ocean. Her crew were rescued by Chanaral (United Kingdom). Alice Maud was on a voyage from Calcutta to Bombay, India.
Arthur	United Kingdom	The ship was driven ashore and wrecked at "L'Ance au Brilliant", Province of Canada, British North America. She was on a voyage from London to Quebec City, Province of Canada.

== 17 May ==
List of shipwrecks: 17 May 1863
Ship	State	Description
Cuba	Confederate States of America	American Civil War, Union blockade: The blockade runner′s crew burned her in the Gulf of Mexico to prevent her capture by the sidewheel gunboat USS De Soto (United States Navy).

== 18 May ==
List of shipwrecks: 18 May 1863
Ship	State	Description
Boomerang	(United Kingdom of Great Britain and Ireland) New South Wales	The steamship was lost off Rockhampton, Queensland.
Isabel	Confederate States of America	American Civil War, Union blockade: The schooner was captured and burned in the Gulf of Mexico near Fort Morgan, Alabama, by a boat crew from the screw steamer USS R. R. Cuyler (United States Navy).
Maine Rose	France	The schooner was driven ashore and wrecked at Penarth Head, Glamorgan, United Kingdom. Her crew were rescued by rocket apparatus.
Mischief	United Kingdom	The ship ran aground on the Longships Rocks, off the coast of Cornwall. She was on a voyage from Porthleven, Cornwall to Neath, Glamorgan. She was refloated on 20 May and put in to Penzance, Cornwall.
Newport	United Kingdom	The brig ran aground and sank at Ramsgate, Kent.
Severn	United Kingdom	The steamship was driven ashore at Clevedon, Somerset. Her passengers were landed. She was on a voyage from Bristol, Gloucestershire to Minehead, Somerset.
USS Shepherd Knapp	United States Navy	American Civil War: The armed full-rigged ship was wrecked on a coral reef in the North Atlantic Ocean off Cap-Haïtien, Haiti, and was abandoned.
Spirit of the Tyne	United Kingdom	The paddle tug was driven ashore and wrecked at Penarth Head whilst going to the assistance of Maine Rose (France). Her crew were rescued by rocket apparatus.
Vesta	Norway	The full-rigged ship was wrecked off Isle aux Morts, Newfoundland, British North America. Her crew were rescued.
Walcott	Flag unknown	The brig was lost at Bowens Landing, California.

== 19 May ==
List of shipwrecks: 19 May 1863
Ship	State	Description
Agenoria	United Kingdom	The ship was beached at Harwich, Essex. She was on a voyage from Bo'ness, Lothian to Dieppe, Seine-Inférieure, France.
Anna Elise	Netherlands	The barque was driven ashore and sank at Sadler's Point, County Durham, United Kingdom. She was on a voyage from South Shields, County Durham to Batavia, Netherlands East Indies. She was refloated in late July and beached.
Britannia	United Kingdom	The smack was driven ashore at Hastings, Sussex. Her four crew were rescued by the Hastings Lifeboat.
Brothers	United Kingdom	The schooner collided with Colleen Bawn (United Kingdom) and sank in the North Sea off the Newarp Lightship ( Trinity House). Brothers was on a voyage from Middlesbrough, Yorkshire to London.
Colima	United Kingdom	The ship ran aground in the Belfast Lough. She was on a voyage from Caernarfon to Sligo.
Eclipse	United Kingdom	The schooner was driven on to rocks at Pendennis Castle, Cornwall. She was on a voyage from Exmouth, Devon to Neath, Glamorgan. She was refloated on 21 May with assistance from the steamship Dandy (United Kingdom) and towed in to Falmouth, Cornwall.
Exchange	United Kingdom	The ship collided with the brigantine Scotia (United Kingdom) and foundered off the Runnel Stone, Cornwall. She was on a voyage from Devoran, Cornwall to Swansea, Glamorgan.
Faith	United Kingdom	The brig ran aground on the Racer Shoal, off the north Norfolk coast. She floated off and was beached at Warham, Norfolk, where she was wrecked. Her ten crew were rescued by a Blakeney yawl. She was on a voyage from Sunderland, County Durham to Bordeaux, Gironde, France.
Londonderry	United Kingdom	The brig ran aground on the Pye Sand, in the North Sea off the coast of Essex. She was refloated with assistance from the smack John and William (United Kingdom) and taken in to Handford Creek.
Margaret and Sarah	United Kingdom	The ship was wrecked in Table Bay. Her crew were rescued.
Merioneth	United Kingdom	The ship was wrecked in Table Bay. Her crew were rescued.
Norseman	United Kingdom	American Civil War, Union blockade: Attempting to run the Union blockade with a cargo of cotton and possibly gold, the 49- or 197-ton screw steamer struck the wreck of the steamship Georgiana (Confederate States of America) and sank in Maffitt's Channel near Isle of Palms, South Carolina, Confederate States of America.
Parkfield	United Kingdom	The ship was wrecked near "Great Manoce", New Brunswick, British North America. Her crew were rescued.
Sisters	United Kingdom	The sloop was wrecked at Montrose, Forfarshire. Her crew were rescued by the Montrose Lifeboat. She was on a voyage from Bo'ness, Lothian to Banff, Aberdeenshire.
Speedy	United Kingdom	The smack struck a rock and sank off Morte Point, Devon. Her crew were rescued. She was on a voyage from Bideford, Devon to Cardiff, Glamorgan.
Vulcan	United Kingdom	The schooner was driven onto rocks at Lyme Regis, Dorset. She was refloated with the assistance of the Lyme Regis Lifeboat and assisted in to that port.

== 20 May ==
List of shipwrecks: 20 May 1863
Ship	State	Description
Anna Wilhelmina	Sweden	The schooner was abandoned in the North Sea. Her crew survived. She was subsequently beached north of Fredrikshald, Norway before being refloated and assisted in to that port.
Appoline	United Kingdom	The brigantine was wrecked at Indian Point, Cuba. Her crew were rescued. She was on a voyage from Baltimore, Maryland, United States to Trinidad de Cuba, Cuba.
Baltimore	United States	The ship was wrecked at Indian Point.
Eastern Queen	United Kingdom	The ship was sighted in the Atlantic Ocean whilst on a voyage from Sunderland, County Durham to Shanghai, China. No further trace, presumed foundered with the loss of all hands.
Exchange	United Kingdom	The brigantine foundered. Her crew were rescued by the steamship Montagu (United Kingdom). Exchange was on a voyage from Truro, Cornwall to Swansea, Glamorgan.
Fairy	United Kingdom	The barque foundered in the Indian Ocean. Her crew were rescued by Arundel (United Kingdom). Fairy was on a voyage from Colombo, Ceylon to London.
Fidelity	United Kingdom	The ship was abandoned off the Blasket Islands, County Kerry. Her crew were rescued by Vesper (United Kingdom). Fidelity was on a voyage from Cardiff, Glamorgan to Galway.
Grace	United Kingdom	The barque was driven into the yachts Echo, Fantasy, Mirage and William and Margaret and the cutter Wellington (all United Kingdom and was then ashore at Kingstown, County Dublin. Grace was on a voyage from Saint John's, Newfoundland, British North America to Dublin. She was later refloated with the assistance of two tugs.
John Merrick	United States	The full-rigged ship was driven ashore at Cape de Gatt, Spain. Her crew were rescued.
Lydia Jane	United Kingdom	The ship put in to Harwich, Essex in a leaky condition and was beached.
Maria	United Kingdom	The schooner spang a leak and was abandoned off the Longships Lighthouse, Cornwall. Her crew were rescued by a pilot cutter. She was on a voyage from Pentewan, Cornwall to Newport, Monmouthshire.
Niobe	United Kingdom	The ship was driven ashore and sank in the Narva River. She was on a voyage from Hartlepool, County Durham to Narva, Russia.
Onward	United States	The ship was wrecked on the Jardanillos. She was on a voyage from Cienfuegos, Cuba to Boston, Massachusetts.
Queen of the East	United States	The ship was driven ashore at Manasquan, New Jersey. She was on a voyage from Antwerp, Belgium to New York. She was refloated on 22 May and completed her journey.
Rose	United Kingdom	The schooner collided with Cheshire Witch (United Kingdom) and was abandoned off the Isles of Scilly. Her crew were rescued by Cheshire Witch. Rose was on a voyage from Llanelly, Glamorgan to London.
Royal William	United Kingdom	The ship was driven ashore at Courtown, County Wexford.
Susannah	United Kingdom	The schooner sank off Great Yarmouth, Norfolk. Her crew survived.
Walker	United Kingdom	The brig was driven ashore in the Saint Lawrence River. Her crew were rescued. She was on a voyage from Barcelona, Spain to Quebec City, Province of Canada, British North America.
Unnamed	United Kingdom	The Humber Keel sank 5 nautical miles (9.3 km) off Wells-next-the-Sea, Norfolk. Her crew survived.

== 21 May ==
List of shipwrecks: 21 May 1863
Ship	State	Description
Bombay Castle	China	The steamship capsized at Bombay, India. She had been righted by 8 June and placed under repair.
Breakwater	United Kingdom	The ship ran aground on the Falls, off the north Norfolk coast and sank. Her crew survived.
Commodore	United Kingdom	The ship ran aground on the Pladders, in the Irish Sea off the coast of Anglesey. She was refloated and put in to Youghal, County Cork in a leaky condition.
Galveston	Flag unknown	The brig was stranded at Kents Point, Mendocino, California United States.
Guajra	Brazil	The steamship was destroyed at Acarahú by a boiler explosion with the loss of nine lives.
John Mowlem	United Kingdom	The ship ran aground at Bridport, Dorset. She was on a voyage from South Shields, County Durham to Bridport. She was refloated.
CSS Mobile	Confederate States Navy	American Civil War: The screw steamer was burned – possibly while laid up and undergoing conversion into a gunboat – at Yazoo City, Mississippi, to prevent her capture by Union forces.
CSS Republic	Confederate States Navy	American Civil War: Union forces found the charred remains of the sidewheel paddle steamer, under conversion to an ironclad ram when Confederate forces burned her to prevent her capture by Union forces, in the navy yard at Yazoo City, Mississippi.

== 22 May ==
List of shipwrecks: 22 May 1863
Ship	State	Description
Golden Age	Confederate States of America	American Civil War: Confederate forces scuttled the sidewheel paddle steamer as a blockship in the Yazoo River about 15 nautical miles (28 km) below Fort Pemberton, Mississippi. Union forces later burned the wreck to the waterline.
John Walsh	Confederate States of America	American Civil War: Confederate forces scuttled the 809-ton sidewheel paddle steamer as a blockship in the Yazoo River 15 nautical miles (28 km) below Greenwood, Mississippi. Later in the month, the armed sternwheel paddle steamer USS Forest Rose, armed sternwheel paddle steamer USS Linden, and tinclad steamer USS Petrel (all United States Navy burned the wreck to the waterline.
Magenta	United States	The 424-ton sidewheel paddle steamer struck a snag and sank without loss of life in a bend of the Missouri River below De Witt, Missouri. The vessel and her cargo both were a total loss.
Medway	United Kingdom	The full-rigged ship caught fire at Sydney, New South Wales and was scuttled. Subsequently refloated and repaired.
R. J. Lackland, or R. J. Lockland	Confederate States of America	American Civil War: As United States Navy gunboats approached, the 710-ton sidewheel paddle steamer was burned to the waterline and scuttled by Confederate forces in the Yazoo River 15 nautical miles (28 km) below Greenwood to block the channel and prevent her capture by Union forces.
Scotia	United Kingdom	The ship foundered off the Isles of Scilly. Her crew were rescued by Adrianus Johannes (Flag unknown).
Scotland	Confederate States of America	American Civil War: The 567-ton sidewheel paddle steamer was scuttled by Confederate forces in the Yazoo River 15 nautical miles (28 km) below Greenwood, to block the channel and prevent her capture by Union forces. Union forces later burned her wreck to the waterline.
Sea Bird	United States	American Civil War: The schooner, loaded with a cargo of United States Navy coal, was captured and set afire by Confederate guerrillas on the Neuse River in North Carolina, Confederate States of America. The steamer Allison (United States Army) found the burning schooner and completed her destruction after Allison′s crew had removed her cargo.

== 23 May ==
List of shipwrecks: 23 May 1863
Ship	State	Description
Caroline Anderson	United States	American Civil War: The schooner burned in the waters of Virginia. The armed sidewheel paddle steamer USS Coeur de Lion (United States Navy) rescued her crew and fired sixteen shells into her to scuttle her.
Johanna Hinett	Hamburg	The ship was driven ashore at Burnham Overy Staithe, Norfolk, United Kingdom. She was refloated and towed in to Wells-next-the-Sea, Norfolk.
Vifredea	Spain	The steamship was wrecked on the Burrells, off the coast of County Waterford, United Kingdom. She was on a voyage from a Spanish port to Liverpool, Lancashire, United Kingdom.

== 24 May ==
List of shipwrecks: 24 May 1863
Ship	State	Description
Keseda	Spain	The steamship was wrecked in the Saltee Islands, County Wexford, United Kingdom.

== 25 May ==
List of shipwrecks: 25 May 1863
Ship	State	Description
Camana	United Kingdom	The ship was struck by a whale in the Atlantic Ocean and was consequently abandoned. Her crew were rescued by Commerce (United Kingdom). Camana was on a voyage from Antigua to Liverpool, Lancashire.
Kasen Dorothera	Prussia	The ship ran aground on the Caldren Rocks, in the Truro River. She was on a voyage from Königsberg to Truro, Cornwall, United Kingdom. She was refloated and towed in to Malpas, Cornwall.
S. Gildersleeve	United States	American Civil War, CSS Alabama's South Atlantic Expeditionary Raid: The 848-ton full-rigged ship, bound for Calcutta, India, from London, United Kingdom, with a cargo of coal, was captured and burned in the South Atlantic Ocean off Bahia, Brazil, (12°04′00″S 35°10′45″W) by the screw sloop-of-war CSS Alabama (Confederate States Navy).
Soler	Spain	The 605-bulk-ton sidewheel paddle steamer was wrecked in the Gulf of Mexico. She was on a voyage from Havana, Cuba to Mobile, Alabama, Confederate States of America.

== 27 May ==
List of shipwrecks: 27 May 1863
Ship	State	Description
Bella Donna	United Kingdom	The barque was destroyed by fire at Port of Spain, Trinidad. She was on a voyage from Swansea, Glamorgan to the Port of Spain.
Charity	Confederate States of America	American Civil War, Union blockade: The schooner was captured and burned at Piney Point on the Yeocomico River in Virginia by boats from the armed sidewheel paddle steamer USS Coeur de Lion and the gunboat USS Eureka (both United States Navy).
CSS Chattahoochee	Confederate States Navy	The gunboat was sunk at her anchorage in the Chattahoochee River at Blountstown, Florida, by a boiler explosion, with the loss of 18 lives. She was refloated but never fully repaired.
USS Cincinnati	United States Navy	American Civil War: The sternwheel casemate ironclad was sunk in the Mississippi River by gunfire from Confederate artillery at Vicksburg, Confederate States of America, suffering five killed and 14 wounded by Confederate gunfire and another 15 drowned or missing. She later was refloated, repaired, and returned to service.
Flight	Confederate States of America	American Civil War, Union blockade: The schooner was burned on the Yeocomico River by boats from the armed sidewheel paddle steamer USS Coeur de Lion and the gunboat USS Eureka (both United States Navy).
Gazelle	Confederate States of America	American Civil War, Union blockade: The schooner was burned in the Yeocomico River by boats from the armed sidewheel paddle steamer USS Coeur de Lion and the gunboat USS Eureka (both United States Navy).

== 28 May ==
List of shipwrecks: 28 May 1863
Ship	State	Description
Arctic	Confederate States of America	American Civil War, Union blockade: After being captured in the eastern branch of the Yeocomico River or Wicomico Creek in Virginia by the armed tug USS Satellite (United States Navy), the schooner was burned by the armed tug USS Thomas Freeborn (United States Navy).
USS Brockenborough	United States Navy	American Civil War, Union blockade: The sloop-of-war was wrecked on St. Vincent Island in St. George's Sound on the coast of Florida during a hurricane.
USS Lily	United States Navy	American Civil War: The tugboat sank in the Yazoo River near Chickasaw Bayou in Warren County, Mississippi, after colliding with the ironclad ram USS Choctaw (United States Navy).
Speed	United Kingdom	The ship was driven ashore on "St. Bernard Island". She was on a voyage from the Rio de la Hacha to a British port.

== 29 May ==
List of shipwrecks: 29 May 1863
Ship	State	Description
USS Amanda	United States Navy	American Civil War: The 368-ton barque, driven aground by a storm in St. George Sound near Dog Island, Florida, on 27 May, was burned by her crew to prevent her capture by Confederate forces.
Andrew Manderson	United States	American Civil War, Union blockade: The 368-ton collier, a barque, was driven aground in a gale and wrecked on Sand Island, in St. George's Sound, Florida, or on 28 May.
Jabez Snow	United States	American Civil War, CSS Alabama's South Atlantic Expeditionary Raid: The 1,074-ton ship, bound from Cardiff, Glamorgan, United Kingdom, to Montevideo, Uruguay, and Calcutta, India, with a cargo of coal, was captured and burned in the South Atlantic Ocean (13°25′11″S 35°38′00″W) by the screw sloop-of-war CSS Alabama (Confederate States Navy).
Oasis	United Kingdom	The ship ran aground in the Yangtze. She was refloated and taken in to Shanghai, China.
Relief	United States	American Civil War: The schooner was burned by Confederate forces at Point Isabel, Texas, Confederate States of America.
Violet	United Kingdom	The brig collided with the steamship Pluto ( Austrian Empire) and sank near Gallipoli, Ottoman Empire with the loss of three of the eleven people on board. Survivors were rescued by Pluto. Violet was on a voyage from Brăila, Ottoman Empire to an English port.

== 30 May ==
List of shipwrecks: 30 May 1863
Ship	State	Description
Albatross	United Kingdom	The barque was wrecked "off the North Foreland". A message in a bottle washed up at Southerness, Dumfriesshire on 8 August stating the fact.
Eager	Confederate States of America	American Civil War, Union blockade: Loaded with a cargo of assorted merchandise, the schooner was burned by the Confederates at a wharf near the custom house at Point Isabel, Texas Confederate States of America, to prevent her capture when launches from the sloop-of-war USS Brooklyn (United States Navy) approached.
East Lothian	United Kingdom	The barque ran aground in the Yangtze. She was on a voyage from Shanghai, China to London.
Emma Bett	Confederate States of America	American Civil War: The 79-ton sternwheel paddle steamer was captured and burned in the Quiver River in Mississippi by a boat expedition from the armed sternwheel paddle steamer USS Forest Rose and the armed sidewheel paddle steamer USS Linden (both United States Navy).
Margaret and Jessie	Confederate States of America	American Civil War: Damaged by gunfire from the sidewheel paddle steamer USS Rhode Island (United States Navy) while trying to run the Union blockade with a large cargo of cotton and 16 passengers on board, the steamer was run aground on Eleuthera in the Bahamas by her crew to prevent her from sinking. Gunfire from Rhode Island killed one person aboard Margaret and Jessie. Subsequently salvaged and commissioned into the United States Navy as USS Gettysburg.
Star	Confederate States of America	American Civil War, Union blockade: The schooner was captured, run aground, and burned at Point Isabel, Texas, by a shore party from the sloop-of-war USS Brooklyn (United States Navy).
Victoria	Confederate States of America	American Civil War, Union blockade: The 100-ton sloop was captured at Point Isabel, Texas, by a four-boat expedition from the sloop-of-war USS Brooklyn (United States Navy). The boat crews burned her after she ran aground as they attempted to get her into the Gulf of Mexico.

== 31 May ==
List of shipwrecks: 31 May 1863
Ship	State	Description
USS Alert	United States Navy	The armed tug burned and sank while moored at a wharf at Gosport Navy Yard in Portsmouth, Virginia. She was refloated, repaired, and returned to service.
Antias	United Kingdom	The ship ran aground at Sandsend, Yorkshire. She was refloated and taken in to Whitby, Yorkshire.
Isabella Robertson	United Kingdom	The ship ran aground on the Kentish Knock. She was on a voyage from North Shields, Northumberland to Galle, Ceylon. She was refloated and taken in to London for repairs.
Rata	Norway	The brig was lost near Lemvig, Denmark. Her crew were rescued. She was on a voyage from Grimsby, Lincolnshire, United Kingdom to Sandefjord.
Thomas	United Kingdom	The ship was driven ashore at Skipsea, Yorkshire. She was refloated and taken in to Bridlington, Yorkshire to.

== Unknown date ==
List of shipwrecks: Unknown date in May 1863
Ship	State	Description
Active	United Kingdom	The ship was driven ashore at Dover, Kent. She was refloated on 20 May and taken in to Dover.
Alonzo Child	Confederate States of America	American Civil War: The 493-ton sidewheel paddle steamer was shot to pieces at Snyder's Bluff on the Yazoo River in Mississippi by the ironclad gunboat USS Baron DeKalb (United States Navy). Union forces scuttled her wreck as a blockship in the Yazoo River at Haynes' Bluff in Mississippi.
Anna and Elise	Netherlands	The ship ran aground at North Shields, Northumberland, United Kingdom and was wrecked.
Annie Wark	United Kingdom	The ship was driven ashore at Maceió, Brazil. She was consequently condemned.
Archimede	France	The ship was run down and sunk off "Melazzo" by the steamship Etna (Italy).
Briard	United Kingdom	The ship was lost in ice off the coast of British North America. She was on a voyage from Jersey, Channel Islands to Arichat, Nova Scotia, British North America.
Camden	United Kingdom	The ship was wrecked on the Table Reefs. She was on a voyage from Jacmel, Haiti to Bordeaux, Gironde, France.
Canada	United Kingdom	The ship was abandoned in ice off the coast of British North America before 3 May.
Clara	United Kingdom	The ship ran aground on the Hveen Reef, in the Baltic Sea. She was on a voyage from Runcorn, Cheshire to Riga, Russia. She was refloated.
Delgany	United Kingdom	The ship was driven ashore at Gaspé, Province of Canada, British North America before 30 May. She was on a voyage from Liverpool, Lancashire to Quebec City, Province of Canada.
CSS Dew Drop	Confederate States Navy	American Civil War: Carrying a cargo of commissary stores, the 184-ton sidewheel paddle steamer was burned to the waterline and sunk as a blockship by Confederate forces in the Quiver River 15 miles (24 km) below Greenwood, Mississippi on 25 or 30 May. A boat expedition from the armed sternwheel paddle steamer USS Forest Rose and the armed sidewheel paddle steamer USS Linden (both United States Navy) boarded her wreck on 30 May and set it afire, completing her destruction.
Everton	United Kingdom	The ship was wrecked on the coast of Queensland. Her crew survived.
Flying Cloud	Confederate States of America	American Civil War: The sloop was sunk in Tabb's Creek in Virginia.
Goliah	United Kingdom	The ship was driven ashore at Gaspé before 28 May. She was on a voyage from Liverpool to Quebec City.
Industry	Denmark	The schooner was driven ashore near Hellevoetsluis, Zeeland, Netherlands.
Irene	United Kingdom	The ship ran aground on the Blacktail Sand, in the Thames Estuary. She was on a voyage from Danzig to London.
Iskandah Shah	India	The ship was destroyed by fire in the Hooghly River. She was on a voyage from Calcutta to a port in China.
CSS Ivy	Confederate States of America	American Civil War: The sidewheel paddle steamer was burned on the Yazoo River to prevent her capture by Union forces.
Joshua Lange	Bremen	The ship was driven ashore near Bremen.
Little Henry	United Kingdom	The ship was driven ahshore at Staithes, Yorkshire before 22 May.
Lord Lyndhurst	United Kingdom	The ship struck the Ariadne Rock. She was on a voyage from Shanghai to Hong Kong. She put back to Shanghai and was beached.
CSS Magenta	Confederate States Navy	American Civil War: The 782-ton sidewheel paddle steamer was burned by Confederate forces in the Yazoo River about 5 nautical miles (9.3 km) above Yazoo City, Mississippi sometime between 24 and 31 May to prevent her capture by approaching United States Navy gunboats.
Mary Jane	United Kingdom	The ship was driven ashore at Staithes before 22 May.
Miranda	United Kingdom	The barque was wrecked near Paranaguá, Brazil.
Oberon	United Kingdom	The ship was lost off Cape Horn, Chile. She was on a voyage form London to Callao, Peru.
Olive Branch	United Kingdom	The ship was driven ashore 4 nautical miles (7.4 km) west of "Cape Rosier". She was on a voyage from Liverpool to Quebec City.
Osprey	United Kingdom	The barque was lost.
Parsee	United Kingdom	The ship was lost in ice off the coast of British North America. She was on a voyage from Galway to Quebec City.
Princesza	(United Kingdom of Great Britain and Ireland) Tasmania	The ship was wrecked at Brisbane, Queensland. She was on a voyage from Tasmania to Brisbane.
Rebecca	(United Kingdom of Great Britain and Ireland) Victoria	The ship was wrecked on Clarke Island, Tasmania. She was on a voyage from Port Albert to Otago, New Zealand.
Seabird	United States	American Civil War: The schooner ran aground at the mouth of the Neuse River before 30 May. Her crew were captured and she was burnt by Confederate forces.
Spirit of the Times	United Kingdom	The barque foundered in ice off Petty Harbour, Newfoundland, British North America before 29 May. She was on a voyage from Liverpool to Harbour Grace, Newfoundland.
Thomas F. Secor	United States	American Civil War: The 210-ton full-rigged ship burned at Seabrook's Landing at Hilton Head, South Carolina, Confederate States of America.
Ville de Paris	France	The ship was lost off Singapore, Straits Settlements.
Walker	United Kingdom	The ship was driven ashore at Gaspé before 28 May.
William Eyre	United Kingdom	The ship was driven ashore near Otago, New Zealand. She was on a voyage from Glasgow, Renfrewshire to Otago.
Two unidentified barges	United States	American Civil War: The coal barges were scuttled in the lower part of the Alexandria Falls on the Red River of the South in Louisiana, Confederate States of America to raise the water level so that Rear Admiral David Dixon Porter′s fleet (United States Navy) could escape downstream.
