= Yazoo Pass expedition =

1863 battle of the American Civil War

- Part of the American Civil War
- Operations against Vicksburg and Grant's Bayou Operations. Confederate Union
Date	February 3 – April 12, 1863
Location	Northwestern Mississippi
Result	Confederate victory

Belligerents
United States (Union)	(Confederate States of America) CSA (Confederacy)

Commanders and leaders
(United States Navy) Watson Smith, USN; Leonard F. Ross, USA	William W. Loring, CSA

Units involved
	Fort Pemberton garrison

Strength
8 gunboats 2 rams 1 mortar raft	2,000; 8 guns

The Yazoo Pass expedition was a joint operation of Major General Ulysses S. Grant's Army of the Tennessee and Rear Admiral David D. Porter's Mississippi River Squadron in the Vicksburg campaign of the American Civil War. Grant's objective was to get his troops into a flanking position against the Rebel defenders of the heavily armed Confederate citadel Vicksburg, Mississippi. The expedition was an effort to bypass the Confederate defenses on the bluffs near the city by using the backwaters of the Mississippi Delta as a route from the Mississippi River to the Yazoo River. Once on the Yazoo, the Army would be able to cross the river unopposed and thus achieve their goal.

The operation would require a deep penetration into enemy territory that was dominated by water, so cooperation between the two services was necessary. The Union Army forces were commanded by Brigadier General Leonard F. Ross, while the Union Navy flotilla was led by Lieutenant Commander Watson Smith, whose extremely poor health was an important factor in the ultimate failure of the expedition.

The expedition began on February 3, 1863, with the breaching of a levee on the Mississippi River, allowing water to flow from the river into a former channel that connected with the Yazoo River through a series of other waterways. The attacking fleet passed through the cut into Moon Lake, through the Yazoo Pass to the Coldwater River, and then into the Tallahatchie, which combines with the Yalobusha to form the Yazoo River, which met the Mississippi a short distance above Vicksburg. From the start, the expedition was delayed by natural obstacles that were more serious than the perfunctory Confederate resistance, so forward motion was as little as ten miles (16 km) a day. Because progress was so slow, the Confederate Army under Lieutenant General John C. Pemberton was able to set up a fort and block passage of the Federal fleet near the town of Greenwood, Mississippi. The Federal fleet did not approach the fort until March 11; then, the ironclad gunboats of the fleet were repulsed in a series of gunfire exchanges on three separate days. Because of the nature of the ground, much of which was under water, the Army troops present could not contribute significantly to the battle.

Following the third repulse on March 16, Lieutenant Commander Smith's health failed him completely, and he turned command over to Lieutenant Commander James P. Foster. Foster and Ross decided to withdraw to the Mississippi. They were temporarily persuaded to try again when they met reinforcements for the Army, but they resumed their retreat when the new army commander, Brigadier General Isaac F. Quinby, saw the futility of further attacks. The entire force had returned by April 12, and the expedition was over.

== Background ==
The Vicksburg campaign was bogged down in early 1863, following the repulse of the Union forces under Brigadier General William T. Sherman at Walnut Hills (or Chickasaw Bayou) late the previous year. Major General Ulysses S. Grant wanted to keep his troops busy until he could begin active campaigning later in the spring, so he ordered them to undertake several moves that would give the appearance of activity but would not bring on a major battle. Grant, writing in his memoirs long after the event, stated that he did not have great confidence that any of them would prove successful, although he was prepared to take advantage of them if they did. One of the operations he put in motion became known as the Yazoo Pass expedition because it used a waterway of that name.

=== Geography ===
The western part of the state of Mississippi, from the Tennessee state line to the north and Vicksburg at the south, is a part of the flood plain of the Mississippi River. As such, it is quite low; in many places, it is in fact lower than the level of the river. The region is therefore occupied by numerous marshes, brakes, sloughs, bayous, lakes, creeks, and rivers that in the geologic past were parts of the river bed. Until the middle of the nineteenth century, overflow from the Mississippi continued to pass into these waters, and they could be used as alternatives to the main river for water transportation. One such route left the Mississippi at a point a little south of Helena, Arkansas, passed through Moon Lake (an oxbow lake, i.e. a former loop of the river that had been cut off when it changed course), and followed the Yazoo Pass to the Coldwater River. The Coldwater is a tributary of the Tallahatchie River, which combines with the Yalobusha to form the Yazoo River at Greenwood, Mississippi. The Yazoo then flows 188 miles (303 km), to reenter the Mississippi a short distance above Vicksburg. This changed in 1856, however, when the coming of the railroad induced the state to drain some of the land for agricultural uses. To that end, they built artificial levees to confine the river to its main course. Deprived of its principal source, the water level behind the levee dropped as much as eight feet (approximately 2.5 m).

=== Preliminaries ===
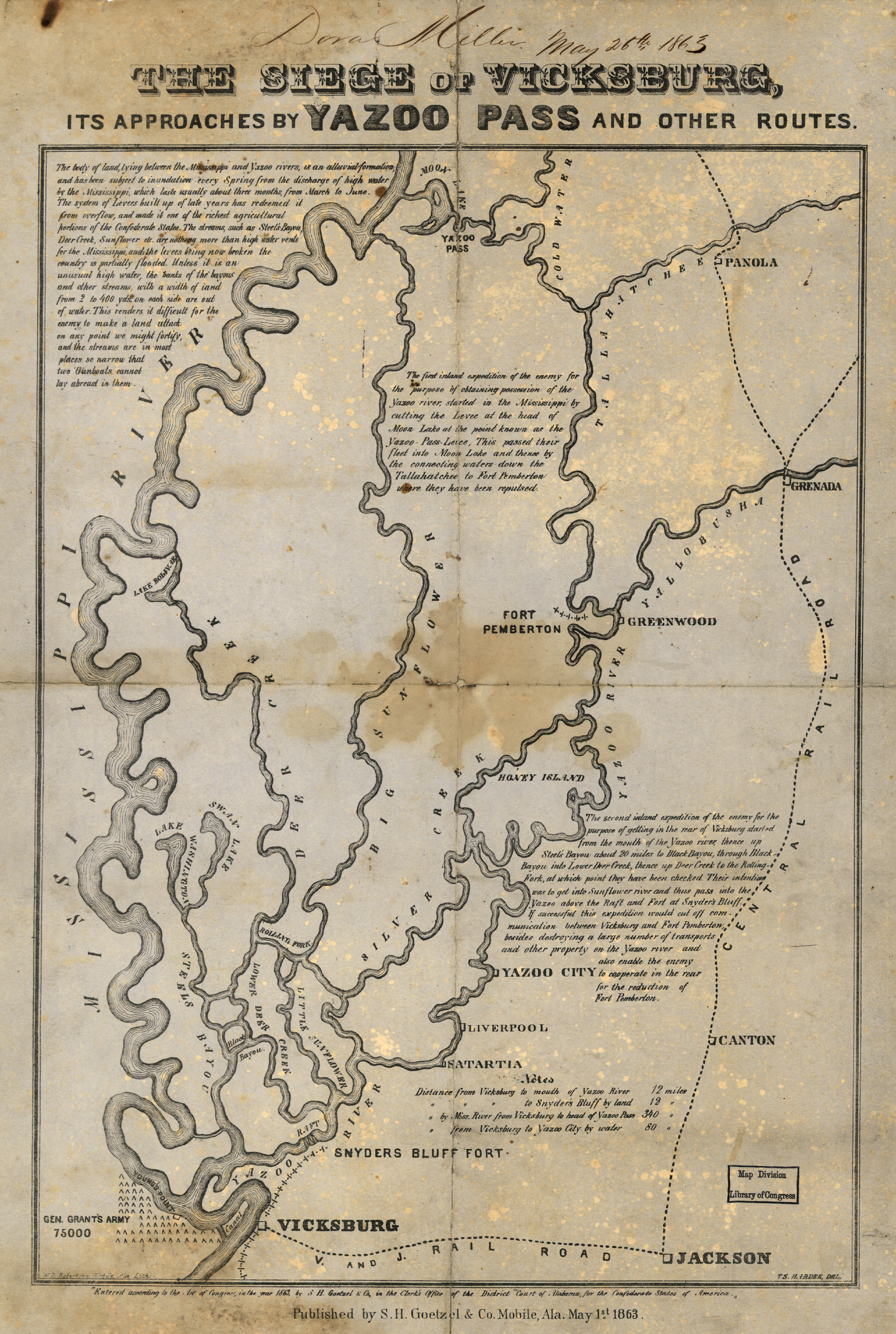
1865 descriptive map

The Army and Navy had distinct but not incompatible reasons to get their forces to the east of Vicksburg. Grant wanted to get his soldiers onto dry ground with no rivers between him and the Confederate defense. Once that was done, he believed that he could flank Pemberton's Confederate army. At the same time, he could divert a part of the expedition up the Yalobusha River to destroy a railroad bridge that was enabling the enemy to threaten his own line of communications. Porter's purpose was to use his armored gunboats to destroy Rebel shipping at Yazoo City. He emphasized that any enemy ironclads must be destroyed, if possible on the stocks. Although the two services had divergent goals, this did not affect the expedition adversely; its ultimate failure is ascribed to other causes.

A preliminary survey by Acting Master George W. Brown in the steamboat USS Forest Rose confirmed the feasibility of the operation, and on February 3, 1863, a group of some 400 pioneers under Lieutenant Colonel James H. Wilson dug two gaps in the levee at the site where the Old Yazoo Pass had formerly met the Mississippi. At this time, the difference in water level between the river and the former stream bed was eight feet (2.4 m), so the water rushed through the openings with great vigor, enlarging the gap and carrying away everything in its path. By the next day, the gap had increased in size to 80 yards (73 m). The flow was so great that the vessels assigned to the expedition could not safely enter for several days. The flotilla of gunboats and army transports passed through the gap on February 24 and immediately proceeded into Moon Lake.

== Advance and Confederate response ==
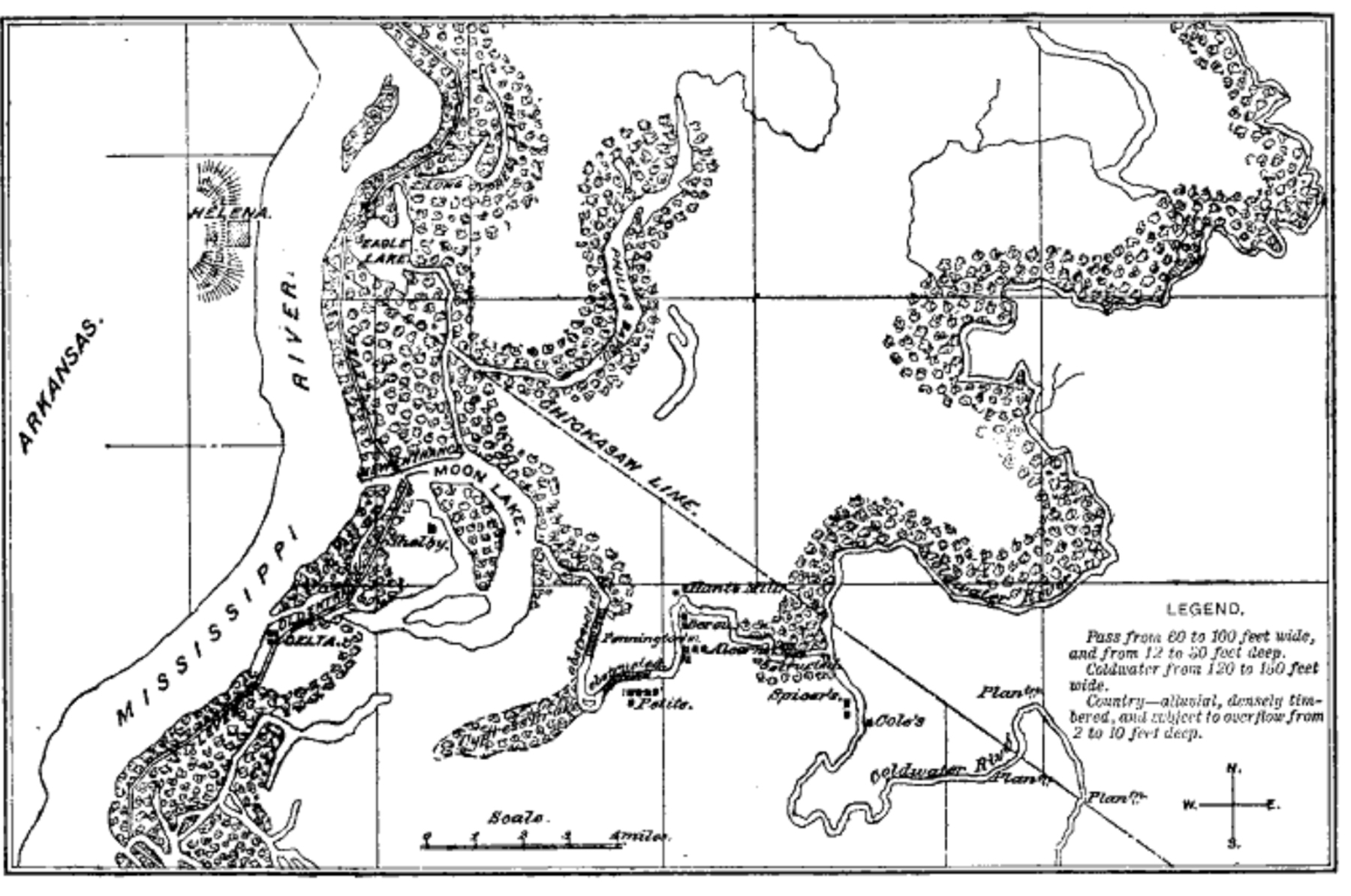
Map of the path of the Yazoo Pass expedition from the Mississippi River to the Coldwater River, prepared by Lt. Col. James H. Wilson (Corps of Engineers).

The naval contingent consisted of seven gunboats and a tug. Five of the gunboats were of a type known colloquially as "tinclads," vessels of light draft carrying thin armor capable of protection only against infantry weapons: USS Rattler, Marmora, Signal, Romeo, and Forest Rose. The other two were the larger and heavier Baron De Kalb, one of the original City class ironclads, and Chillicothe, an inferior second-generation copy. Later, another gunboat, Petrel, and two rams, USS Lioness and USS Dick Fulton, would join the expedition. Lieutenant Commander Watson Smith led the flotilla from his flagship Rattler.

The Army contributed nine infantry regiments that were carried in 13 transports. An additional 600 or so soldiers were sent aboard the tinclads to defend them, if necessary, from Rebel boarding parties that could be expected in an operation so deep in enemy territory. Grant would have sent more troops, but a shortage of available transports prevented him from doing so. The troops were a part of the XIII Corps, under the command of Brigadier General Leonard F. Ross. Later, they would be reinforced by a column led by Brigadier General Isaac F. Quinby, who ranked Ross.

The Confederates in the meantime were not idle. Lieutenant General John C. Pemberton was aware of his opponents' intent as soon as the levee had been breached, if not before, and he gave orders to Major General William W. Loring to stop them. He immediately organized some work details to block the Yazoo Pass and Coldwater River by felling trees across the streams, but they were largely ineffective. The obstructions were quickly removed by Union army engineers under the leadership of Lieutenant Colonel Wilson. More serious, however, was a fort that Loring ordered to be built a few miles upstream from the point where the Tallahatchie and Yalobusha Rivers combine to form the Yazoo. A peculiarity of the courses of the Tallahatchie and the Yazoo is that they flow past each other on opposite sides of a neck of land that is only a couple of hundred yards (or meters) wide. Here, Loring's men made a barricade of cotton bales, covered them with layers of dirt, and mounted a pair of heavy guns. This hastily constructed earthwork was named "Fort Pemberton," or sometimes "Fort Greenwood." He had other batteries lining the bank of the Tallahatchie almost all the way to the Yalobusha, and still others on the Yazoo. In addition, he had built a boom or raft that could be swung out to block the stream, and in the channel just downstream of this he scuttled a ship, the former Star of the West.

Loring had time to set up the defense because the progress of the Union flotilla was painfully slow. Instead of pushing ahead with his ironclads, Lieutenant Commander Smith insisted that the entire force, gunboats and transports alike, should move together. They could move only in daylight hours, but Smith continued to recoal his vessels during the day. Furthermore, they would waste hours in the early mornings and would stop at midday for lunch. Moving faster than the current, according to Smith, "brings us foul." Ross protested strongly against the lack of urgency, as did Smith's second in command, Lieutenant Commander James P. Foster. Their pleas were disregarded. Smith's torpor may have been a result of his declining health; he had been sick when the expedition started, but he had stayed on, hoping that he would improve when his fleet was in motion. Instead, he only got worse, and he eventually had to relinquish command to Foster. By then, however, it was too late.

== Clash at Fort Pemberton ==
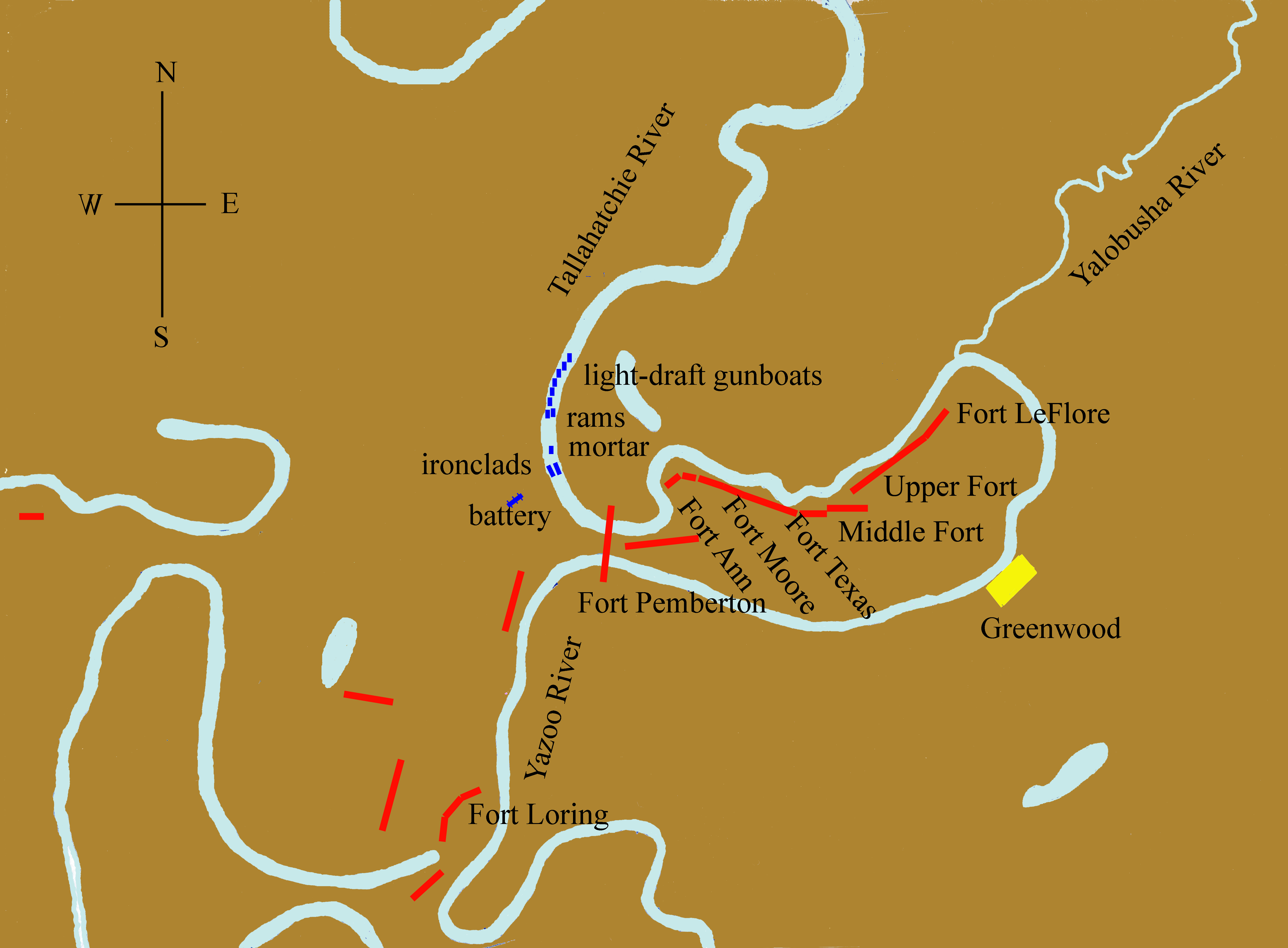
Opposing forces near Fort Pemberton. The Union fleet and battery are shown in blue, the Confederate forces in red.

The Union flotilla finally arrived in the vicinity of Fort Pemberton on March 11, more than five weeks after the levee at Yazoo Cut had been breached. A probe sent out by the Army, accompanied by Chillicothe, found that the terrain near the fort was too marshy to support an attack by infantry. The attack would have to be carried out by the gunboats, aided by whatever artillery could be brought ashore and brought to bear. Not even all of the gunboats could participate; because the river was rather narrow, only two boats could engage at a time, and these only bows on to the enemy. The initial probe was followed by a more determined bombardment by Chillicothe and Baron De Kalb. In this action, Chillicothe sustained the most serious injury of the operation. A shell from Fort Pemberton passed through one of her gun ports while the 11-inch (280 mm) gun was being loaded, striking the shell and causing both to explode. The gun itself was not harmed, but 14 members of the gun crew were killed or wounded. Another man was killed by a later hit. Baron De Kalb did not suffer any significant damage, because of her superior construction and because the Confederate gun crews concentrated their fire on the more vulnerable Chillicothe.

The next day (March 12) was given over to repairing the damage suffered by the gunboats, and giving them additional protection by placing cotton bales on the foredecks. Smith also landed a pair of 30-pounder Parrott guns, one from his flagship Rattler and the other from Forest Rose. He also sent ashore a 12-pounder howitzer. They were sited some 800 yards (730 m) from the fort, and were, like the guns in the fort, shielded by cotton bales covered with dirt.

The two ironclads returned to action on March 13, this time assisted by the shore battery and the mortar boat. The Confederate gunners again concentrated their fire on Chillicothe. Although she lost only three wounded among her crew, the pounding she took from the enemy artillery loosened many of her armor plates and generally revealed the inadequacy of her construction. Baron De Kalb, although not punished so severely, lost three of her officers and men killed and three others wounded. The Rebels lost some of their men also, when a shell entered a magazine. Although it did not explode, its fuze set fire to the ammunition stored there, and the fire killed one man and burned 15 others. Another shell killed a man and wounded two others. At the end of the day, Fort Pemberton was basically unscathed; the gunboats, however, particularly Chillicothe, had been badly battered. Smith failed to note that the Confederate fire was slackening at the end of the day, their ammunition supply being depleted.

Smith spent the next two days repairing his vessels and landing a broadside 8-inch (200 mm) gun taken from Baron De Kalb. He and Ross decided to make a determined assault on Monday, March 16. The ironclads would be pushed closer to Fort Pemberton than before in order to be better able to silence its guns. They would advance side by side with the mortar boat lashed between them. Infantry would follow in tinclads behind them, ready to go ashore as soon as the guns in the fort were knocked out and a suitable landing place could be found. The planned attack collapsed almost immediately when a series of shot or shell hit Chillicothe's casemate. The impact buckled the armor plates in such a manner that the gun port stoppers could not be raised. Chillicothe was forced to retire, and Smith decided to pull the relatively undamaged Baron De Kalb out of action also. That was essentially the end of the Union effort. Smith finally realized that his health was impeding the expedition, so he turned command over to his second-in-command, Lieutenant Commander James P. Foster.

Foster and Ross decided together that further effort would be futile, so the flotilla began to withdraw the next day. They had not gone far when they encountered a group of Union transports bringing in reinforcements under the command of Brigadier General Isaac F. Quinby, whose appointment predated that of Ross and who therefore ranked him. Quinby ordered Ross to go back down the river to renew the attack, and he persuaded Foster (whom he could not order) to accompany him. A few desultory probes were launched in the next several days, but Quinby found what Ross already knew, that the land was unsuitable for an infantry assault. Quinby received orders from Grant to return to the Mississippi, where he and Ross were needed for the next assault on Vicksburg. The flotilla withdrew from Fort Pemberton for the last time, and by April 14 all had returned.

== Site coordinates ==
- Yazoo Cut34°24.7′N 90°33.9′W
- Fort Pemberton33°31.7′N 90°14.1′W

== See also ==
- Yazoo City expedition
