= USS Kendrick =

Benson-class destroyer

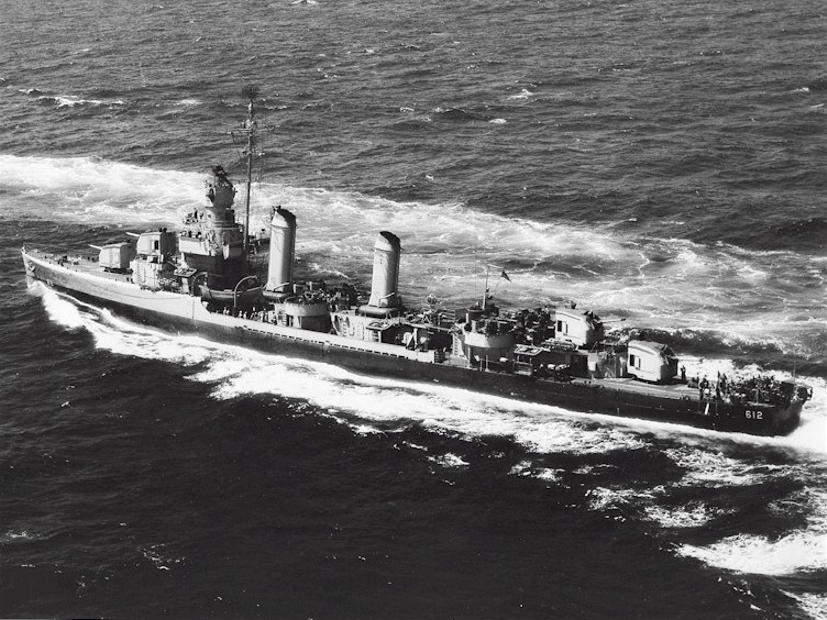
- USS Kendrick (DD-612) underway at sea on 27 June 1945

History

United States
- Name: USS Kendrick (DD-612)
- Namesake: Charles S. Kendrick
- Builder: Bethlehem Shipbuilding, San Pedro, California
- Launched: 2 April 1942
- Commissioned: 12 September 1942
- Decommissioned: 31 March 1947
- Stricken: 1 May 1966
- Fate: Destroyed in tests

General characteristics
- Class & type: Benson-class destroyer
- Displacement: 1,620 tons
- Length: 348 ft 4 in (106.17 m)
- Beam: 36 ft 1 in (11.00 m)
- Draught: 11 ft 9 in (3.58 m)
- Speed: 37.5 kn (69.5 km/h)
- Complement: 256
- Armament: 4 x 5 in (130 mm)/38 guns, 4 x 40 mm., 6 dcp., 2 dct., 5 x 21 inch (533 mm) tt.

USS Kendrick (DD-612) was a Benson-class destroyer in the United States Navy during World War II.

== Namesake ==
Charles S. Kendrick was born on 23 January 1817 in Kentucky. Early in the American Civil War, as Third Master in Army gunboat St. Louis of the Western Flotilla, he took part in the captures of Fort Henry, Fort Donelson, Island No. 10, Memphis, and Fort St. Charles. On 1 October 1862, when the Western Flotilla was transferred to the Navy, he was commissioned Acting Master in the U.S. Navy. On 30 April 1863, while commanding a landing party which drove Confederate sharpshooters from the river banks at Haines Bluff, he personally captured a Southern officer in hand-to-hand combat. In July he commanded USS Petrel when it and USS Forest Rose ascended the Tensas River and captured Confederate steamers Louisville and Elmira. The following month Acting Master Kendrick was stricken with fever and died at the Naval Hospital, Memphis, Tennessee on 13 August 1863.

== Construction and commissioning ==
Kendrick was launched 2 April 1942 by Bethlehem Shipbuilding, San Pedro, California; sponsored by Mrs. J. Hanson Delvac, a great-granddaughter of Acting Master Charles S. Kendrick; and commissioned 12 September 1942.

== Operation Torch ==
After shakedown exercises along the West Coast, Kendrick cleared San Diego, California on 11 December 1942 and arrived Casco Bay, Maine on 28 December for ASW exercises. The destroyer then sailed to New York to join Convoy UG-S-4 and sailed 13 January 1943 for Casablanca. She returned to New York 13 February with another convoy, and commenced patrol, escort, and training from Norfolk, Virginia to Newfoundland. Kendrick departed New York 28 April for a round trip escort mission to Oran, Algeria, and returned New York on 8 June.

After 3 days, the destroyer once again steamed toward the Mediterranean Sea, escorting Rear Admiral Alan G. Kirk's Task Force 85, which carried Major General Troy Middleton's 45th Infantry Division. She arrived Oran, staging area for the invasion of Sicily, on 22 June. Kendrick sailed 5 July and arrived off the beaches of Scoglitti 4 days later. She guarded transports and landing craft until 12 July, then steamed as escort for troop ships via Oran to New York, arriving there 4 August.

She returned to Oran 2 September. That night, a German torpedo bomber (Heinkel He 111) made a surprise attack on Kendrick's starboard quarter. The plane roared in 50 feet above the water and launched two torpedoes before it was shot down by the destroyer's gunners. One of the torpedoes struck Kendrick's stern, damaging her rudder, steering compartment, and fantail, and killed one crew member. As she turned back to Oran, the destroyer stopped to throw life rings to the crew of the enemy plane and reported their position.

== Mediterranean Operations ==
After temporary repairs at Oran, Kendrick was towed to Norfolk, arriving 26 October. Upon completion of repairs she made a round-trip escort cruise to the United Kingdom before sailing 18 February 1944 as a convoy escort. Arriving Oran 5 March, she prepared for patrol and screening operations, and joined the screen of Philadelphia. For nearly 3 months, the destroyer repeatedly provided effective gunfire in support of ground troops advancing up the Italian boot. After Rome was liberated, she stood by to support the Allied drive in northern Italy.

She cleared Palermo 12 August for the invasion of southern France. As a unit of Rear Admiral Morton Deyo's American-French bombardment group, Kendrick gave direct fire support to the 36th Infantry Division storming the beaches on 15 August. She helped silence German 88 mm guns from 15 to 16 August, and bombarded gun emplacements and ammunition dumps at St. Madrier, France from 25 to 26 August. Upon completion of her mission, the destroyer steamed toward the United States, arriving at Boston, Massachusetts on 19 September.

Kendrick escorted a convoy to the Mediterranean Sea in mid-November, before returning New York 15 December. She joined a convoy and once again departed Norfolk 6 January 1945, reporting for duty with the 8th Fleet 18 January. For the next 4 months she performed air-sea rescue, escort duty, fire support missions, and patrol duty in the Mediterranean as the war in Europe came to an end. Kendrick cleared Oran 15 May with a convoy and put into New York 8 days later. Following repairs at New York and refresher training in Cuba, the destroyer transited the Panama Canal, arriving Pearl Harbor on 28 August via San Diego, California. She engaged in training exercises out of Hawaii before returning Charleston, South Carolina on 16 October.

== Fate ==
Kendrick remained at Charleston until she decommissioned and joined the Atlantic Reserve Fleet at Orange, Texas, 31 March 1947. On 1 May 1966, her name was struck from the Navy List, and Kendrick was used in destruction tests at sea by the David Taylor Model Basin.

The wreck lies at: 24°27.608′N 81°36.064′W

== Awards ==
Kendrick received three battle stars for World War II service.

As of 2009, no other ship in the United States Navy has been named Kendrick.
