= USS Lancaster (1855) =

Ship

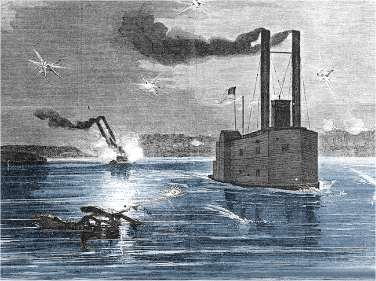
- USS Lancaster follows her sister ship USS Switzerland past the Vicksburg batteries, 25 March 1863

History

United States
- Laid down: 1855 at Cincinnati, Ohio
- Acquired: 1862
- Fate: Sunk 25 March 1863

General characteristics
- Displacement: 257 tons
- Length: 176 ft (54 m)
- Armament: none

USS Lancaster was a sidewheel civilian steamer tow boat built in 1855 at Cincinnati. It was originally named Lancaster Number 3 then Kosciusko. In March through May 1862, she was purchased and converted to a ram by Colonel Charles Ellet Jr. to serve during the American Civil War as part of the United States Ram Fleet and the Mississippi Marine Brigade.

== First Battle of Memphis ==
After fitting out, she steamed down the Ohio river to join the United States Ram Fleet being organizing to counter Confederate rams in the Mississippi River.

On 10 May the Confederate ram flotilla, known as the River Defense Fleet, attacked Union gunboats and mortar schooners at Plum Point Bend, Tennessee, sinking USS Cincinnati and forcing USS Mound City aground. A fortnight later all but one of the rams had joined the Union flotilla above Fort Pillow ready for action. As the ram fleet and western flotilla prepared to attack, General Henry Wager Halleck's capture of Corinth, Mississippi on 30 May, cut the railway lines which supported the Confederate positions at Forts Pillow and Randolph forcing the South to abandon these river strongholds.

The Confederacy charged its River Defense Fleet with the task of stemming the Union advance down the Mississippi. The South's strategy called for a naval stand at Memphis, Tennessee.

On the evening of 6 June, Flag Officer Charles Henry Davis arrived above the city with his ironclads. Before dawn the next morning the Union ships raised their anchors and dropped downstream by their sterns. Half an hour later the Confederate rams got underway from the Memphis levee and opened fire, beginning the First Battle of Memphis.

At this point Colonel Ellet ordered his rams to steam through the line of Flag Officer Davis' slower ironclads and run down the Confederate steamers. His flagship USS Queen of the West headed straight for CSS Colonel Lovell, the leading southern ram. A moment before the two ships crashed, one of Colonel Lovell's engines failed causing her to veer. The Union ram's reinforced prow smashed into Colonel Lovell's side ripping a fatal hole in her side. When Queen of the West pulled free from Lovell she ran aground on the Arkansas shore. Meanwhile, Union ram USS Monarch crashed into foundering Colonel Lovell with a second blow which sent her to the river bottom with all but five of her crew. By then Davis' ironclads had steamed within easy range of the southern ships and began to score with the effective fire. In the ensuing close action, the Confederate River Defense Fleet was destroyed; all of its ships, except CSS General Earl Van Dorn, were either captured, sunk, or grounded to avoid capture. Memphis surrendered to Flag Officer Davis.

== Battle of Vicksburg ==
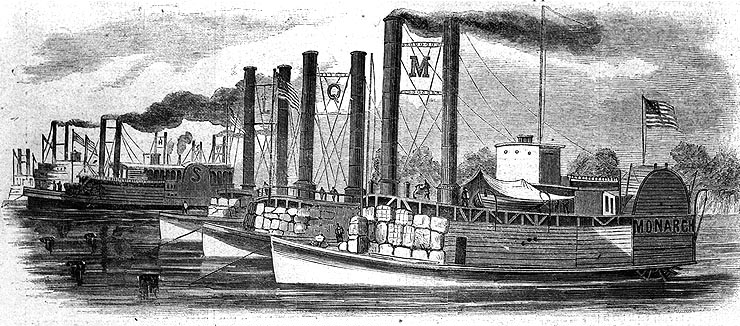
Ellet's rams on the Mississippi, Lancaster on the far left, circa 1860

On 19 June Lancaster and four sister rams got underway downstream from Memphis. Two days later she captured and sank a ferryboat used to transport Confederate troops from the West across the Mississippi. A week later, after the rams had moved down the river to a point just above Vicksburg, Mississippi, Ellet sent a party across the peninsula, formed by a bend in the river opposite the hillside town, to tell David Farragut, just below the fortress, that the Union had won control of the upper Mississippi. Farragut ran the gauntlet past Vicksburg's guns 28 June, and Flag Officer Davis joined him above the city with the western flotilla 1 July.

During the coming months, Lancaster and her sisters of the ram fleet worked tirelessly to take Vicksburg. On 15 July Confederate ironclad ram Arkansas raced down the Yazoo River and fought through the combined Union squadrons to shelter under the guns at Vicksburg. At the first sight of Arkansas, Lancaster cut her line; dropped down with the current; and strained to build up sufficient steam pressure to ram the southern ship. As her speed increased, Lancaster headed straight for Arkansas; but when she was a mere 100 yards from her quarry, a broadside from the ironclad opened up her steam lines and made her unmanageable. As Lancaster drifted downstream, Queen of the West caught her and towed her to safety. The following day ram USS Mingo came alongside and took Lancaster to Memphis for repairs.

== The sinking of Lancaster ==
After she was back in fighting shape, the ram resumed operations on the Mississippi towing other ships against the swift current, performing reconnaissance work, and escorting Union supply ships and transports up and down the river. This vital task of protecting General Ulysses S. Grant's logistic lines was necessitated by stepped-up southern guerrilla activity and cavalry raids along the river banks.

In mid-March 1863, Farragut returned to the river and managed to run two of his ships upstream past southern batteries at Port Hudson to blockade the mouth of the Red River which the Confederacy had used to funnel supplies and men from the West to Jefferson Davis’ armies east of the Mississippi. He then requested Rear Admiral David Dixon Porter to send him reinforcements from the Western Flotilla to help with the task.

In the wee hours of 25 March, two of Ellet's rams, USS Switzerland and Lancaster, prepared to answer the call. They came within range of the hostile hillside guns just as the still hidden sun began to lighten the sky's midnight blue. Bright flashes burst along the hilltops as Confederate cannon lashed out at the rams. A shell exploded in Lancaster's steam drum and then a solid shot plunged into her stern and tore a great hole in her bottom. As the muddy Mississippi poured into her hull, Lancaster's commander, Lieutenant Colonel John A. Ellet, ordered her crew to abandon the ship, and the ram sank hard by the bow.
