= Fort Pemberton Site =

Fort Pemberton Site may refer to:

- Fort Pemberton Site (Greenwood, Mississippi), listed on the National Register of Historic Places in Leflore County, Mississippi
- Fort Pemberton Site (Charleston, South Carolina), listed on the National Register of Historic Places in Charleston County, South Carolina
