= Fort Pemberton =

Fort Pemberton may refer to:

- Fort Pemberton (Mississippi), a Confederate fort near Greenwood, Mississippi
- Fort Pemberton (South Carolina), a Confederate fort on James Island South Carolina
