= USS Mingo (1862) =

Coordinates: 37.315°N 89.509°W

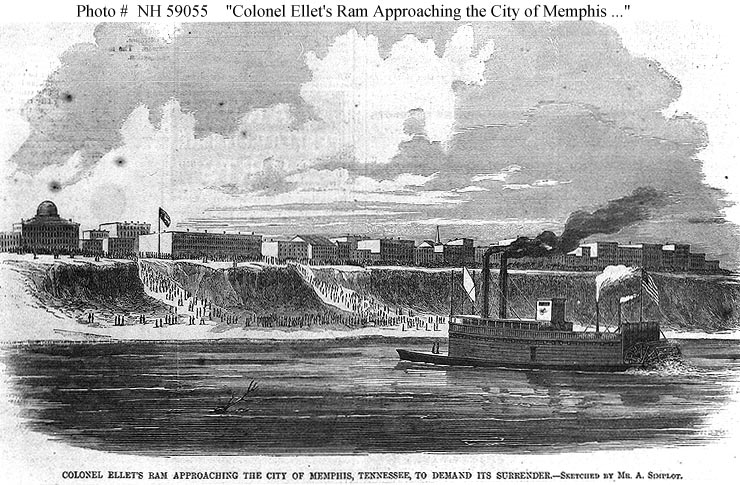

History
- Laid down: 1859 at California, Pennsylvania
- Out of service: November 1862
- Fate: Sank November 1862 accidentally at Cape Girardeau, Missouri

General characteristics
- Displacement: 228 tons
- Propulsion: Stern-wheel ram
- Speed: 12 knots

The first USS Mingo, a stern-wheel steamer built at California, Pennsylvania, in 1859 and used to tow coal barges, was purchased at Pittsburgh by Colonel Charles Ellet Jr. in April 1862 for usage in the U.S. Ram Fleet during the American Civil War.

== Ellet Ram Fleet ==
She was fitted out as a ram at Pittsburgh and headed down the Ohio River 29 April to join a fleet of rams which Ellet was organizing to counter the Confederate River Defense Fleet. This group of southern rams had been fitted out in the lower Mississippi and threatened to emulate the dreaded southern ironclad ram Virginia in routing wooden hulled Union ships. On 10 May the Confederate flotilla made a spirited attack on Union gunboats and mortar schooners at Plum Point Bend, Tennessee, sinking Cincinnati and forcing the Mound City aground. A fortnight later all but one of the rams had joined the Union flotilla above Fort Pillow ready for action. As the ram fleet and Western Flotilla prepared to attack, General Halleck's capture of Corinth, Mississippi, on 30 May cut the railway lines which supported the Confederate positions at Forts Pillow and Randolph, forcing the South to abandon these river strongholds.

== First Battle of Memphis ==
The Confederacy charged its River Defense Fleet, the only remaining operational group of southern warships worthy of the name fleet, with the task of stemming the Union advance down the Mississippi. The South's strategy called for a naval stand at Memphis, Tennessee.

On the evening of 6 June, Flag Officer Davis arrived above the city with his ironclads. Before dawn the next morning the Union ships raised their anchors and dropped downstream by their sterns. Half an hour later the Confederate rams got underway from the Memphis levee and opened fire.

At this point Colonel Ellet ordered his rams to steam through the line of Flag Officer Davis' slower ironclads and to run down the Confederate steamers. His flagship Queen of the West headed straight for Colonel Lovell, the leading southern ram. A moment before the two ships crashed, one of Colonel Lovell's engines failed causing her to veer. The Union ram's reinforced prow smashed into Colonel Lovell's side, ripping a fatal hole in her hull. When Queen of the West pulled free from Lovell, she ran aground on the Arkansas shore. Meanwhile, Union ram Monarch crashed into foundering Lovell with a second blow which sent her to the river bottom with all but five of her crew. By then Davis' ironclads had steamed within easy range of the southern ships and began to score with the effective fire. In the ensuing close action, the Confederate River Defense Fleet was destroyed; all of its ships, except the Van Dorn, were either captured, sunk, or grounded. Mingo and Lioness, ordered to protect the rear of Ellet's column, reached the scene of battle after the rout was over. Memphis surrendered to Flag Officer Davis, and the pressure of relentless naval power placed another important segment of the Mississippi firmly under Union control, an open wound in the Confederate heartland. During the next few days, the rams took on cannon to prepare to fight Confederate ships which they could not reach with their deadly prows.

== Battle of Vicksburg ==
On 19 June, Mingo and four sister rams got underway downstream from Memphis. A week later, after the rams had moved down the river to a point just above Vicksburg, Ellet sent a party across the peninsula, formed by a bend in the river opposite the hillside town, to tell Farragut, just below the fortress, that the Union had won control of the upper Mississippi. Farragut ran the gauntlet past Vicksburg's guns 28 June, and Flag Officer Davis joined him above the city with the Western Flotilla 1 July.

The meeting of the fresh water and salt water squadrons helped buoy morale throughout the North, but control of the river which it implied could not be realized until the South lost its Gibraltar-like fortress at Vicksburg. A year of seemingly endless labor and bitter fighting awaited the champions of the Union cause before President Lincoln could write: "The Father of Waters again goes unvexed to the sea..."

On 15 July, the Confederate ironclad ram Arkansas, built at Memphis and completed at Yazoo, Mississippi, raced down the Yazoo River and fought through the combined Union squadrons to shelter under the guns at Vicksburg. At the first sight of Arkansas, Lancaster tried to ram the southern ship; but when she was a mere 100 yards from her quarry, a broadside from the ironclad opened up her lines and made her unmanageable. As Lancaster drifted downstream, Queen of the West caught her and towed her to safety. The following day ram Mingo came alongside and took Lancaster to Memphis for repairs.

In the coming months Mingo and her sister rams worked tirelessly to control the river and to help capture Vicksburg. In November she sank accidentally at Cape Girardeau, Missouri.

== See also ==
- Mississippi Marine Brigade
