= Switzerland (steam ram) =

US Army Civil War steam ship

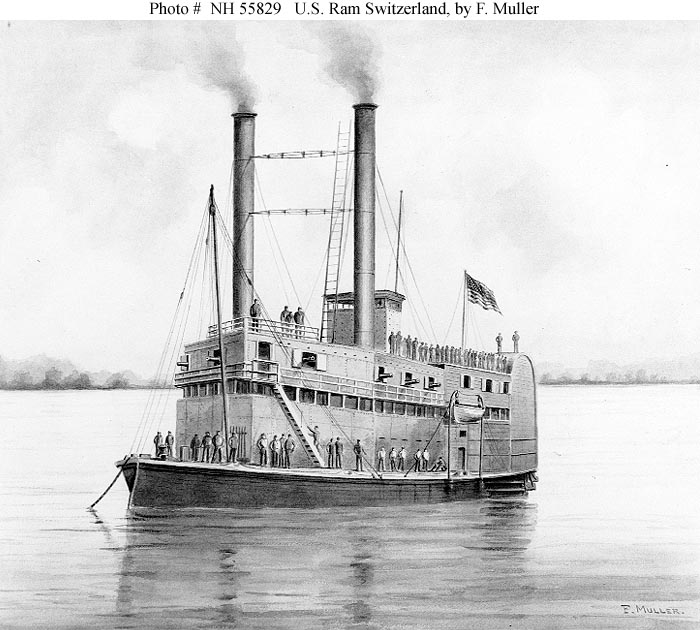
- US Ram Switzerland was operated by the US Army on the Mississippi river

History

United States
- Launched: 1854
- Out of service: 1865

General characteristics
- Displacement: 413 tons
- Propulsion: Side-wheel steamer

US Ram Switzerland was a paddle steamer ram operated by the US Army during the American Civil War as part of the U.S. Ram Fleet and the Mississippi Marine Brigade.

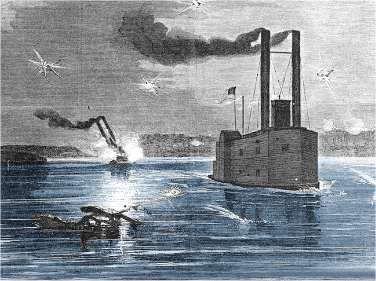
US Ram Switzerland and USS Lancaster.

== Service ==
A 413-ton side-wheel towboat, she was built at Cincinnati, Ohio, in 1854 and converted to a ram in March–May 1862 for Colonel Charles Ellet, Jr.'s U.S. Ram Fleet. She played a distant role in the June 1862 naval action off Memphis, Tennessee, and subsequently took part in operations in the Yazoo River and in the Vicksburg Campaign.

On 25 March 1863, while commanded by Colonel Charles Rivers Ellet, Switzerland joined the ram Lancaster in an attempt to pass the Vicksburg fortress. Both ships were heavily hit by Confederate gunfire, with Lancaster being sunk. Despite her damage, Switzerland survived the trip and made a subsequent successful passage of the fortifications at Grand Gulf, Mississippi, on 31 March. She took part in operations on the Red and Atchafalaya rivers in May and June 1863. Later in the war, Switzerland was part of the Mississippi Marine Brigade.

She was sold in October 1865 and was employed as a merchant steamer under the same name until about 1870.

Switzerland was never commissioned as a Navy vessel.
