= USS Linden =

Union Navy (US) sidewheel steamship

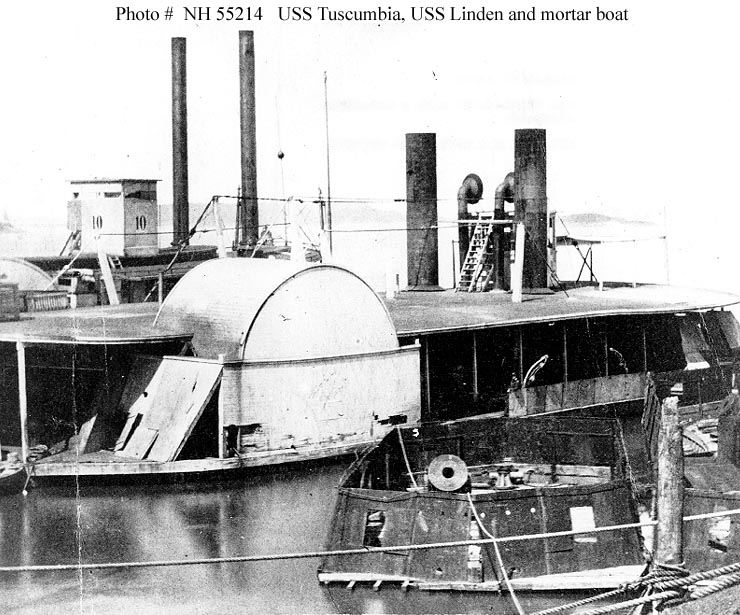
- USS Tuscumbia (1863–1865) tied up with other ships on the Western rivers, circa 1863. USS Linden (1863–1864, "Tinclad" #10) is moored outboard of Tuscumbia.

History

United States
- Launched: 1860
- Acquired: 20 November 1862
- Commissioned: 3 January 1863
- Fate: Sank, 22 February 1864

General characteristics
- Displacement: 177 tons
- Length: 154 ft (47 m)
- Beam: 31 ft (9.4 m)
- Draft: 4 ft (1.2 m)
- Propulsion: steam engine; side wheel-propelled
- Armament: six 24-pounder howitzers

USS Linden was a steamer acquired by the Union Navy during the American Civil War. She was used by the Navy to patrol navigable waterways of the Confederacy to prevent the South from trading with other countries.

== Service history ==
Linden, a wooden sidewheel steamer, was built in 1860 at Belle Vernon, Pennsylvania; purchased by the Navy at Cincinnati, Ohio, 20 November 1862; and commissioned at Cairo, Illinois, 3 January 1863, acting Master Thomas E. Smith in command. Linden departed Cairo 9 January escorting charter steamer Home and five coal barges to Memphis, Tennessee. After convoy duty up and down the Mississippi River, Linden was ordered to cooperate with General Ulysses S. Grant in cutting a canal between the Red and Black Rivers through Tensas Bayou. The project was pressed vigorously but as Porter later noted "...there were miles of forest to work through and trees to be cut down. The swift current drove the steamers (Army transports) against the trees and injured them so much that this plan had to be abandoned."

Throughout the winter and spring of 1863, Linden continued to support operations against the Confederate river stronghold at Vicksburg. She remained above the fortress when Admiral David Dixon Porter and his gunboats dashed under Vickburg's guns to support Grant's campaign from below. On 29 April with seven other Union Navy ships, three mortar boats and 10 large Army transports, Linden began a feigned attack on the Confederate batteries at Haynes Bluff on the Yazoo River above Vicksburg. The movement was designed to prevent southern reinforcement of Grand Gulf where Grant was about to land his troops after crossing the Mississippi River. That day the expedition proceeded as far as Chickasaw Bayou. On the 30th the task force moved up the Yazoo River, and landed troops who marched up " ... the levee, making quite a display, and a threatening one also." Naval gunfire supported the demonstration until Grant had safely ferried his men across the river and landed at Bruinsburg, Mississippi. Then the diversionary troops withdrew from Haynes Bluff, reembarked, and the expedition returned to the mouth of the Yazoo River.

Grant then daringly abandoned his supply lines, drove deep into Mississippi, and defeated converging Confederate forces in detail in several spectacular victories before turning back toward the river to threaten Vicksburg in reverse. At mid-May, Admiral Porter ordered Linden back up the Yazoo to assist the Army in encircling the southern river stronghold and to supply the Union Army. When Confederate troops were cut off at Snyder's Bluff, the Union ships pushed on to Haynes Bluff which the South was evacuating. When these heavy works fell, the gunboat again advanced and began to shell the hill batteries at Vicksburg. On 18 May Linden while escorting five Army transports on the Mississippi silenced a masked battery at Island No. 82; then covered troops who landed and destroyed buildings in the area. On 21 May, Linden, Baron De Kalb, Choctaw, Forest Rose, and Petrel ascended the Yazoo River to Yazoo City, Mississippi, and forced the Confederate Navy to destroy three "powerful steamers, rams, and a fine Navy Yard" to prevent their capture. On 20 May Linden and Forest Rose reconnoitered Quiver River, Mississippi, and a boat expedition from the ships captured and burned Dew Drop and Emma Bett.

The tireless efforts of both Navy and Army bore fruit when Vicksburg's dogged defenders finally hauled down the Confederate flag 4 July giving the United States one of its greatest birthday presents, freedom to navigate the Mississippi River from source to the Gulf of Mexico. In the coming months Linden performed valuable but unspectacular service on reconnaissance and convoy missions on the Mississippi River and its tributaries. On 22 February 1864, while attempting to aid transport Ad. Hines, Linden struck a snag 15 miles up the Arkansas River and sank.
