= Milano Hotel =

- U.S. National Register of Historic Places
- Location within California
- Location: 38300 California State Route 1, South, Gualala, California
- Coordinates: 38°46′40″N 123°32′27″W
- Area: 2 acres (0.81 ha)
- Built: 1905
- Built by: Batiste Luchinetti
- Architectural style: Italianate
- NRHP reference No.: 78000720
- Added to NRHP: June 23, 1978

The Milano Hotel, at 38300 California Highway 1, South, about a mile north of Gualala, California, was built in 1905. It was listed on the National Register of Historic Places in 1978.

Construction was supervised by, and it was run as a hotel, saloon, and dining room, by Italian immigrant Batiste Luchinetti. It was built on cliffs facing the Pacific Ocean between Gualala and Bowens Landing, California. (Bowen's Landing was a lumber port / doghole port about 86 miles north of San Francisco.)

It survived the 1906 San Francisco earthquake with bottles being broken at its bar.

It is "flat front Italianate" in style.

A carriage shed and a small barn are two additional contributing buildings in the listing.
