= Isaac Ferdinand Quinby =

American soldier and Union general

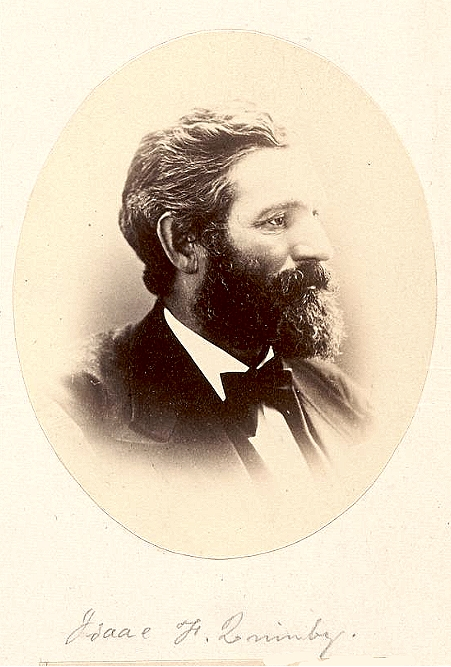
- Born: January 29, 1821; Morristown, New Jersey
- Died: September 18, 1891 (aged 70); Rochester, New York
- Burial place: Mount Hope Cemetery, Rochester, New York
- Military career
- Allegiance: United States of America; Union
- Branch: United States Army; Union Army
- Service years: 1843–1852, 1861–1863
- Rank: Brigadier General of Volunteers
- Commands: 13th New York Volunteer Infantry; 7th Division, XVII Corps
- Conflicts: Mexican–American War; American Civil War: First Battle of Bull Run; Yazoo Pass Expedition; Siege of Vicksburg
- Other work: professor, U.S. Marshal, author

Isaac Ferdinand Quinby (January 29, 1821 – September 18, 1891) was a U.S. soldier and Union general during the American Civil War.

== Biography ==
He was born near Morristown, New Jersey in 1821. He attended the United States Military Academy at West Point and graduated in 1843, ranking 6 out of 39 classmates. His early service in the army was with the 2nd U.S. Artillery and later during the Mexican War he served in the 3rd U.S. Artillery. In 1852 he resigned from the army and moved to New York where he became a professor of math and philosophy at the University of Rochester.

When the Civil War began in 1861, Quinby was appointed colonel of the 13th New York Volunteer Infantry. He led his regiment into action at the First Battle of Bull Run in 1861. In August of that year he resigned from the army but on March 17, 1862, was appointed brigadier general of volunteers and sent to the Western Theater to command the Sub-district of Columbus. Shortly after he arrived in the West, he was placed in command of the District of Mississippi where forces under his command captured Fort Pillow on May 22, 1862. After commanding various other districts, Quinby was placed in command of the 7th Division, XIII Corps. This division eventually became the 7th Division of James B. McPherson’s XVII Corps.

In March 1863 Admiral David D. Porter and General Leonard F. Ross led the Yazoo Pass Expedition against Confederate-held Fort Pemberton. After the expedition had departed, Quinby’s division was sent out as reinforcements. Quinby met Ross and Porter on March 20 and learned the expedition had failed but convinced them to return and try again. The continuation resulted in two more unsuccessful artillery duels and the expedition ended for good on April 5. During the expedition Quinby became ill and took a leave of absence and General Marcellus M. Crocker assumed command of the 7th Division. Having recovered, Quinby returned to duty on the morning of May 16 but it was deemed necessary for General Crocker to retain command of the division as they were deploying for Battle at Champion Hill. Quinby agreed, concluding he was still in a feeble condition from the journey to rejoin the army. He did however remain on the field until the battle was decided only then did he officially assume command of the division. Quinby led his division during the May 22 assaults on Vicksburg. During the siege, on June 3, Quinby’s health began to fail him again, and went on another sick leave, only this time he would not return to field command. He returned to New York where he commanded a Draft Depot at Elmira, New York before he resigned from the army on December 31, 1863.

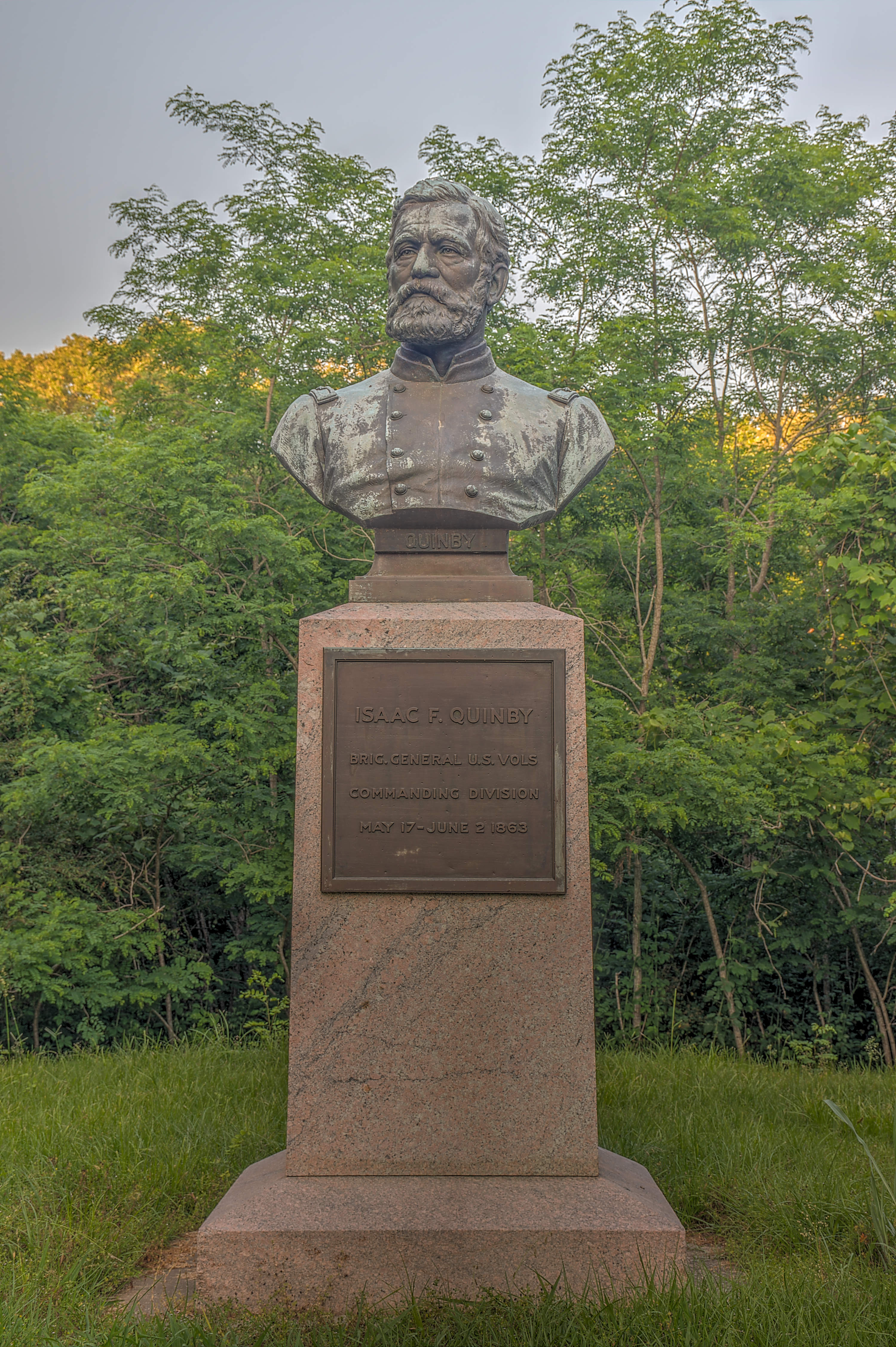
bust of Quinby by William Couper at Vicksburg National Military Park

Quinby returned to his position as a professor at the University of Rochester in 1863 and taught there until 1884. Later in life, he served as a U.S. Marshal and author. He died in Rochester, New York in 1891.

== See also ==
- List of American Civil War generals (Union)
