= Flood Control Act of 1937 =

Act of the United States Congress

The Flood Control Act of 1937 (FCA 1937) was an Act of the United States Congress signed into law by President Franklin D. Roosevelt on August 28, 1937, as Public Law 406. The act was a response to major flooding throughout the United States in the 1930s, culminating with the "Super Flood" of January 1937, the greatest flood recorded on the lower Ohio River. FCA 1937 provided nearly $25 million for initial construction of projects selected by the Chief of Engineers from those listed in the Ohio Valley Flood Control Program (published as Flood Document No. 1, 75th congress, 1st Session). Among the numerous projects authorized, the act provided for construction of floodwalls, levees, and revetments along Wolf River and Nonconnah Creek for protection of Memphis, TN and modified the Yazoo River project to substitute a combined reservoir floodway and levee plan.

Section 2 authorized small clearing and snagging projects for flood control, limited in Federal cost per project (50 Stat. 877, 33 U.S.C. 7Olg).

FCA 1937 was subsequently amended on. Many of the provisions of FCA 1937 are administered by the United States Army Corps of Engineers.

- 24 July 1946 by Section 13, Pub. L. 79–526
- 24 September 1954 by Section 208, Pub. L. 83–780 (these projects are customarily referred to as "Section 208 Projects")
- 7 March 1974 by Section 26, Pub. L. 93–251
- 17 November 1986 by Section 915(b), Water Resources Development Act of 1986, Pub. L. 99–662. The latter amended the Federal limit per project to $500,000.

== See also ==
- Water Resources Development Act
- Rivers and Harbors Act - for related legislation which sometimes also implements flood control provisions.
