= USS Lioness =

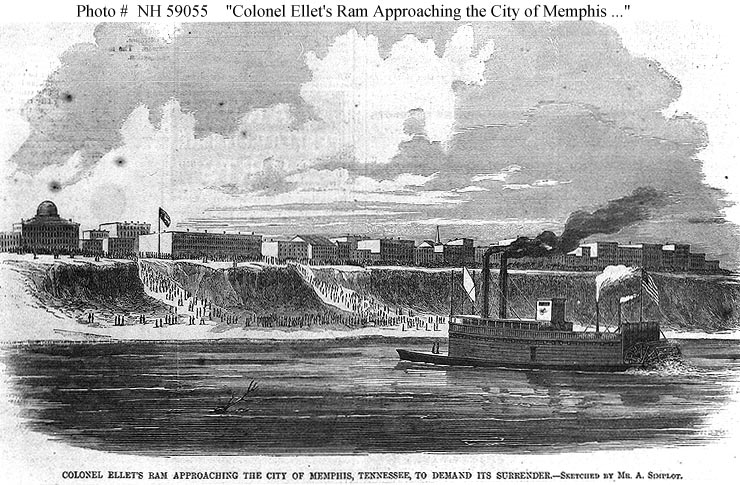
- The USS Lioness invading Memphis, Tennessee

History
- Laid down: 1859 at Brownsville, Pennsylvania
- Commissioned: 1862
- Decommissioned: 1865
- In service: 1862-1863
- Stricken: sold, September 1865
- Fate: civilian use until 1869

General characteristics
- Displacement: 198 tons
- Propulsion: stern-wheel steamer

Built in Brownsville, Pennsylvania, in 1857, the steam ship Lioness was purchased by the War Department and converted to a ram ship for Colonel Charles Ellet, Jr.'s United States Ram Fleet. Commissioned in 1862, Lieutenant Warren D. Crandall in command, she joined the Union Mississippi River Squadron on the western rivers.

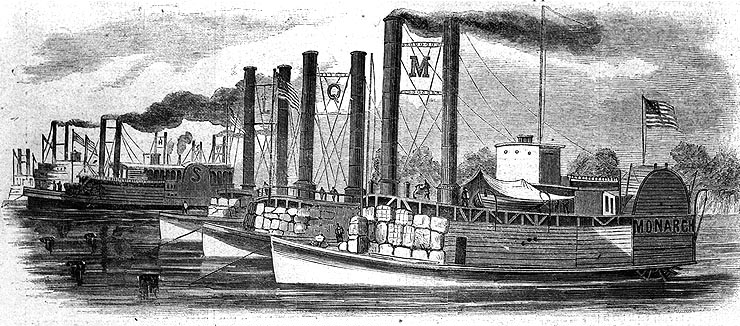
The United States Ram Fleet, the USS Lioness is the ship with the letter "L".

== Service ==
After fitting out at Pittsburgh in April 1862, Lioness departed New Albany for Cairo, Illinois 12 May. Scouting Fort Pillow with other rams on 1 June, she participated on 6 June in the First Battle of Memphis, a one-sided, Union victory. Lioness then joined other rams and three gunboats, convoying and covering army troops under Colonel Woods in a joint expedition from Helena to the Yazoo River, capturing the USS Fairplay, and destroying newly constructed Confederate batteries 20 miles up the Yazoo. The expedition also dispersed Confederate troops at Greenville, Mississippi, before retiring 27 August.

In December, Lioness was at Mound City, Illinois, preparing for further efforts against Vicksburg. On 6 February, she formed part of the expedition to Yazoo Pass and Greenville, operating there until 12 April. Then she and three other rams supported Colonel Charles R. Ellet's marine brigade in the Tennessee.

After Southern naval power on the rivers had been wiped out, Lioness was laid up at Mound City until sold in 1865. She served American commerce until sold abroad in 1873.

== See also ==
- Mississippi Marine Brigade
