= USS Eureka =

Gunboat of the United States Navy

History

United States
- Acquired: 22 August 1862
- In service: c. August 1862
- Out of service: March 1865
- Captured: by Union Navy forces; 20 April 1862
- Fate: Sold, 15 September 1865

General characteristics
- Displacement: 50 tons
- Length: 85 ft (26 m)
- Beam: 12 ft 8 in (3.86 m)
- Depth of hold: 3 ft 6 in (1.07 m)
- Propulsion: steam engine; screw-propelled
- Complement: 19
- Armament: two guns

USS Eureka was a steamer captured by the Union Navy during the American Civil War. She was used by the Union Navy as a gunboat in support of the Union Navy blockade of Confederate waterways.

== Service history ==
Eureka, a screw steamer, was captured 20 April 1862 in the Rappahannock River, Virginia, by USS Anacostia; purchased by the Navy 22 August 1862; and assigned to duty in the Potomac Flotilla, Acting Ensign J. J. Brice in command. For the next 2½ years, Eureka patrolled the Potomac and Rappahannock rivers and their tributaries, to prevent the passage of people and commerce between the Confederates in Virginia and their sympathizers in Maryland. Her shallow draft made her ideal for this duty, essential to controlling the flow of intelligence and supplies to the South. Inactive after March 1865, Eureka was sold at Washington, D.C., 15 September 1865.
