= Fort Pemberton (South Carolina) =

- Fort Pemberton Site
- U.S. National Register of Historic Places
- Location within South Carolina Location within the United States
- Nearest city: Charleston, South Carolina
- Coordinates: 32°45′35″N 80°0′3″W
- Area: 15.8 acres (6.4 ha)
- Built: 1862
- NRHP reference No.: 78002498
- Added to NRHP: November 21, 1978

Fort Pemberton was one of the larger confederate forts was constructed in the defense of Charleston, South Carolina during the American Civil War. At the war's outset in 1861, it became evident that control of the western regions of James Island and the Stono River was to be an important element in the defense of the city. Confederate military authorities of the time believed that Union occupation of James Island would leave Charleston subject to attack from the southeast. From this position, the city would assuredly fall to the Union. Although there were many gun batteries in place along the south and east side of James Island, Fort Pemberton was the only fortress in defense of this region.

== Construction ==
The construction of Fort Pemberton employed largely slave labor drawn from the neighboring plantations. The fort was of earthen construction, except for the framing over the earth-covered shot furnace and powder magazines, which were suspected to be of being wood. The fort's original section was constructed in 1862 by order of Confederate Brig. General John C. Pemberton, who was at the time commander of the Charleston defenses and had the distinction of having the fort named for him. The fort was a heavily fortified structure. It represented an evolved example of Confederate military engineering.

The building's shape was pentagonal, with bastions along the perimeter. The fort measured approximately 400 feet by 350 feet with walls 10 to 12 feet high and 20 feet thick at the base. An additional 700-foot-long rampart was constructed the following year which directly flanked the original section on the southeast.

== Defenses ==
The fort was designed to function as both a land and water battery. By October 1862, the fort's armament included 20 guns of various calibers. The fort's position was to deny Federal gun boat attack from the Stono River which ran along the western shores of James Island. Union gunboats continued to have dominance of portions of the Stono river out of range of Fort Pemberton's guns. In addition, the fort had complete control of the critical Wappoo Creek that meandered eastward into the Ashley River which borders Charleston to the west.

In addition to guarding against water access, the fort was also designed as a land battery. As an enclosed structure, many of Fort Pemberton's guns faced inland in the event of a land attack. Fort Pemberton served as the western anchor of James Island's shore defense.

== Condition ==
The fort has remained essentially intact since its completion in 1863 and is presently covered with a substantial growth of live oak and other indigenous trees. Its setting gives the fort a park-like appearance. Intrusions on the property are several residences which do not significantly alter the integrity of the fort. It was listed on the National Register of Historic Places in 1978.

== Fort Pemberton Park ==
In 2019, the City of Charleston purchased the fort site and surrounding property in the Riverland Terrace neighborhood, which included a private residence built on the earthworks, for $5.78 million with the intention of converting it into a public park. Planning stalled during the COVID-19 pandemic and resumed after the city was awarded a $261,000 grant from the Land and Water Conservation Fund in October 2022. In January 2025, the city council considered a $1.2 million contract for public access improvements at the site. Fort Pemberton Park opened in July 2026 as an 8.7-acre waterfront park on the Stono River, with a fishing dock, kayak launch, walking paths, a picnic shelter, and accessible entrances to the upper fort and the waterfront.
