= Fort Pemberton (Mississippi) =

- U.S. National Register of Historic Places
- Location within Mississippi Location within the United States
- Location: Leflore County, Greenwood, Mississippi
- Coordinates: 33°31′45″N 90°14′07″W
- Area: 1 acre (0.40 ha)
- Built: 1863
- MPS: Fort Pemberton Site
- NRHP reference No.: 73001020
- Added to NRHP: June 19, 1973

Fort Pemberton is a historic artillery battery located at Leflore County, Greenwood, Mississippi. It was built in early 1863 during the Vicksburg Campaign of the American Civil War. The fort was located on the route of the Yazoo Pass, near the confluence of the Tallahatchie and Yalobusha Rivers (which merge there to form the Yazoo River). Fort Pemberton was listed on the National Register of Historic Places on June 19, 1973.

== Background ==
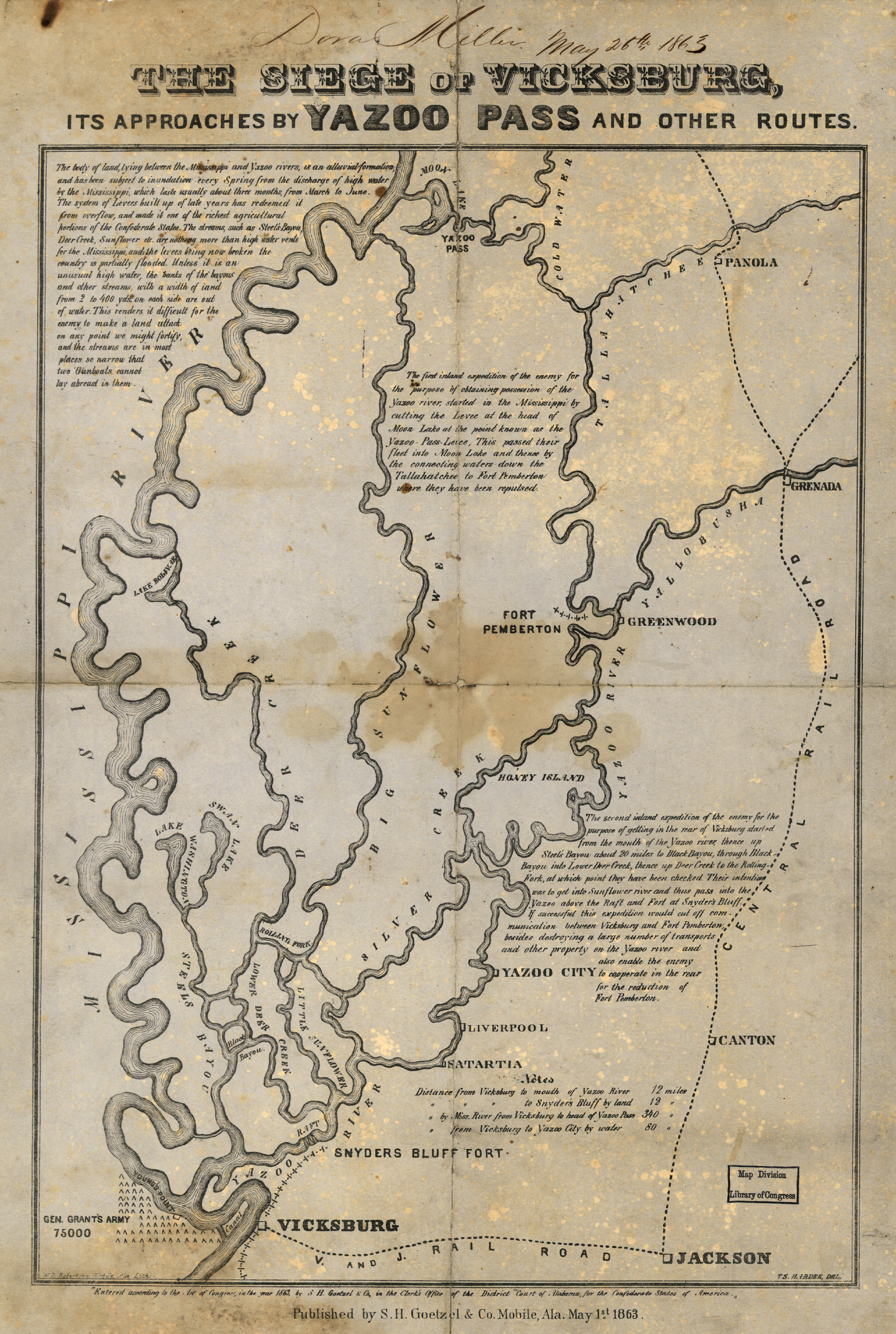
1865 map showing the river system of the Mississippi Delta used in the Yazoo Pass Expedition

In the winter of 1862–1863, Major General Ulysses S. Grant commanding the Army of the Tennessee conducted a series of operations to approach and capture the fortified city of Vicksburg, Mississippi, known as "The Gibraltar of the Confederacy". Since the city's fortifications on bluffs overlooking the Mississippi River were formidable, Grant tried other alternatives that wouldn't require a direct approach under the Confederate guns.

In the opening engagement of the Vicksburg Campaign, an advance on Vicksburg from the north by troops under the command of Union Maj. Gen. William T. Sherman was repulsed by Confederate forces under Lt. Gen. John C. Pemberton at the December 26–29, 1862 Battle of Chickasaw Bayou. There the Union troops also encountered formidable bluff top fortifications. Following this setback, Grant tried several waterborne alternatives. Termed "Grant's bayou operations", the idea was to find or construct alternative water routes so that troops could be brought within striking distance of Vicksburg. One of these operations was the Yazoo Pass expedition, a joint operation with Rear Admiral David D. Porter's Mississippi River Squadron.

The Yazoo Pass was an old water route from Memphis to Yazoo City, which had been closed off by Mississippi River levee construction in 1856 that sealed the Pass. Winding through a series of backwaters of the Mississippi Delta, the Pass had run from the Mississippi River into Moon Lake, to the Coldwater River, then to the Tallahatchie River, and finally into the Yazoo River at Greenwood, Mississippi. From there the Yazoo River continued south to Yazoo City and Vicksburg. Once on the Yazoo north of the defenses of Vicksburg, the Navy could disrupt Confederate shipping at Yazoo City, and the Army would be able to cross the river with scant opposition and secure a bridgehead and supply line.

== Fort Pemberton ==
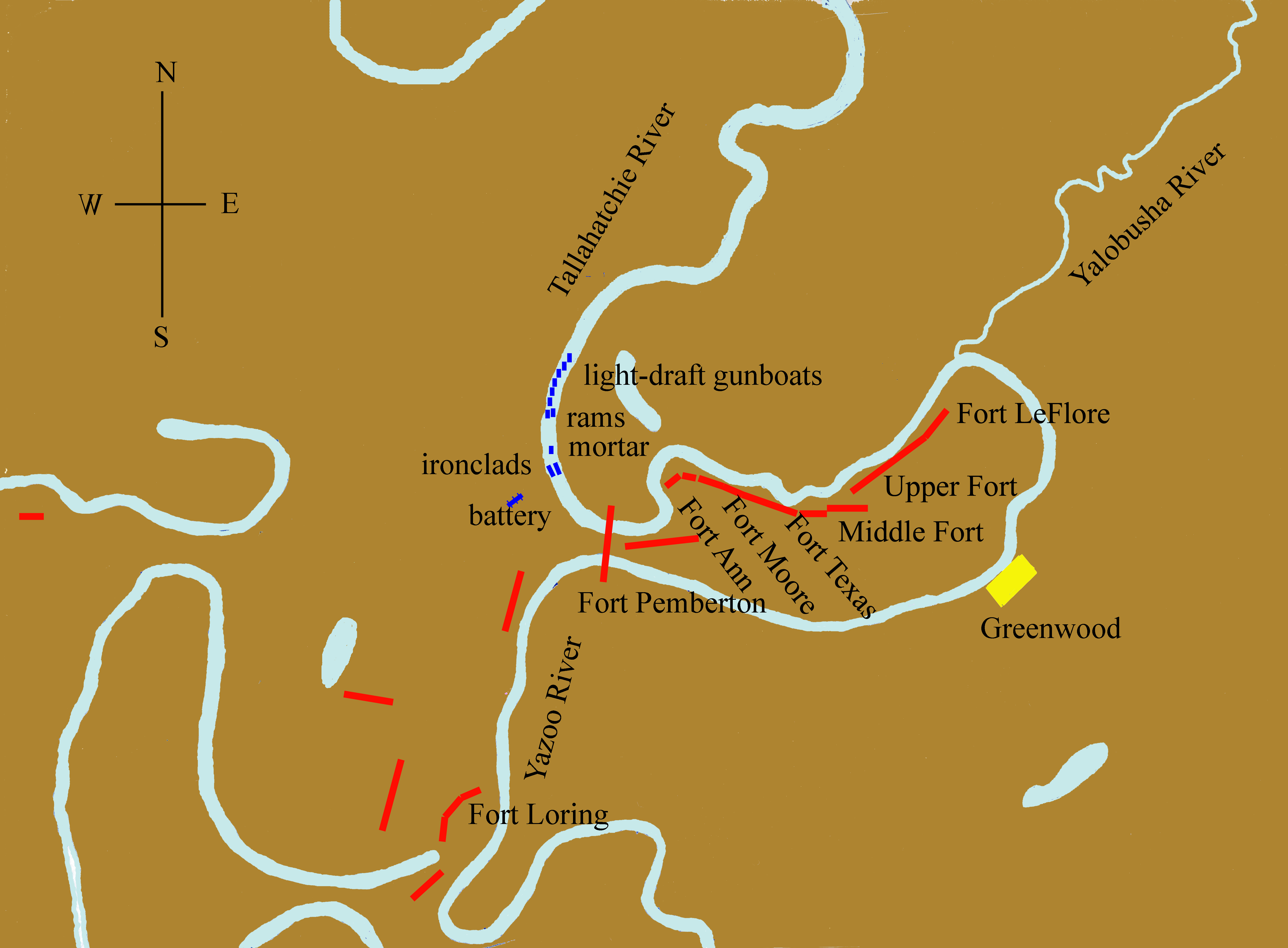
Opposing forces in the vicinity of Fort Pemberton. The Union fleet and battery are shown in blue, the Confederate forces in red.

The Union force began moving through the Yazoo Pass on February 7. But lack of urgency by the Union Navy, coupled with low-hanging tree branches and trees felled by Confederates impeded their progress, allowing the Confederates time to prepare defenses. Pemberton had given orders to Major General William W. Loring to stop the Union advance. At Greenwood, Mississippi there existed a narrow neck of land bordered by the Tallahatchie and the Yazoo Rivers. There, Loring's men hastily built fortifications at an approximate 45-degree angle from northeast to southwest, made of cotton bales and logs covered by layers of dirt, with parapets ten feet high. There they mounted a pair of heavy guns and named the earthworks "Fort Pemberton". The Confederate troops at the fort repulsed the attempts by the Union force on March 11, March 14, March 16, and March 23, halting the Union advance, and ending the Yazoo pass expedition.

== Today ==
Fort Pemberton is now part of Fort Pemberton Memorial Park, in Greenwood, Mississippi.
