= Bowens Landing, California =

Coordinates: 38.785°N 123.562°W

Bowen's Landing, California was a lumber port / "doghole port" about 86 miles (138 km) north of San Francisco.

It seems to be the same place as Bourn's Landing, or Bourne's Landing.
