= USS Forest Rose =

Gunboat of the United States Navy

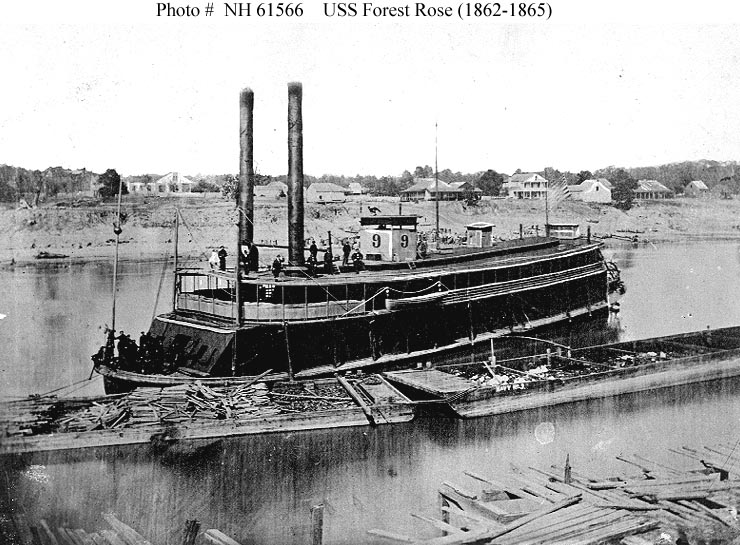
- InsertAltTextHere

History

United States
- Launched: 1862
- Acquired: 15 November 1862
- Commissioned: 3 December 1862
- Decommissioned: 7 August 1865
- Fate: Sold 17 August 1865

General characteristics
- Length: 155 ft 0 in (47.24 m)
- Beam: 32 ft 3 in (9.83 m)
- Draught: 5 ft (1.5 m)
- Speed: 6 kts
- Armament: 2 30-pdr. r., 4 24-pdr. how.

USS Forest Rose was a stern wheel steamer in the United States Navy.

Forest Rose was built in 1862 in Pittsburgh; purchased 15 November 1862; and commissioned 3 December 1862.

Assigned to patrol duty in the Mississippi Squadron, Forest Rose sailed in active cooperation with the Army of the Mississippi throughout her war-time career. She convoyed transports, carried messages, fired on Confederate shore positions and troop detachments, and captured or destroyed a number of small steamers. Her first operations, from 4 to 11 January 1863, were against Fort Hindman in the Arkansas River, and the next month she sailed in the Yazoo Pass Expedition, destroying storehouses and a shipyard at Yazoo City. From 1 June she cruised above Vicksburg, Mississippi, aiding in communications with General U. S. Grant during the last month of the siege on the city, which fell 4 July. From that time, her operations were between Vicksburg and Natchez on the Mississippi, and in the many rivers which flow into it.

From 5 to 15 May 1864 Forest Rose took part in the Red River Expedition, and during the remaining months of the war, several times fired on small parties of Confederates ashore.

== Post war ==
Following the war, she carried ordnance and surplus stores from New Orleans, Louisiana to Jefferson, Missouri, until decommissioned at Mound City, Illinois, 7 August 1865. She was sold 17 August 1865.
