= USS Petrel (1862) =

Gunboat of the United States Navy

History

United States
- Acquired: 22 December 1862
- Fate: Burned, 22 April 1864

General characteristics
- Length: 226 tons
- Armament: eight 24-pounder howitzers

The second USS Petrel was a tinclad wooden steamer in the United States Navy. Petrel was purchased as Duchess at Cincinnati, Ohio, 22 December 1862, renamed Petrel, and commissioned.

Assigned to the Mississippi Squadron, she participated in the Yazoo River expedition against Haynes Bluff, 30 April – 1 May 1863, then went after Confederate shipping on the Yazoo and Sunflower rivers. In July she cruised the Red, Black, Tensas and Ouachita rivers, capturing four rebel vessels and military stores.

On 3 February 1864 she helped silence Confederate batteries at Liverpool, Mississippi, on the Yazoo, to initiate naval operations to prevent Southern harassment of Sherman's expedition to Meridian, Mississippi. For the next two weeks the ships pushed up the Yazoo, engaging Confederate troops as far up the river as Greenwood. A month and a half later, Petrel commenced attacks on Yazoo City.

On 22 April 1864, however, she was disabled, captured, and after the removal of her guns and most valuable stores, was burned.

== See also ==
- Union Navy
- Anaconda Plan
