= Yazoo River =

River in Mississippi, U.S.

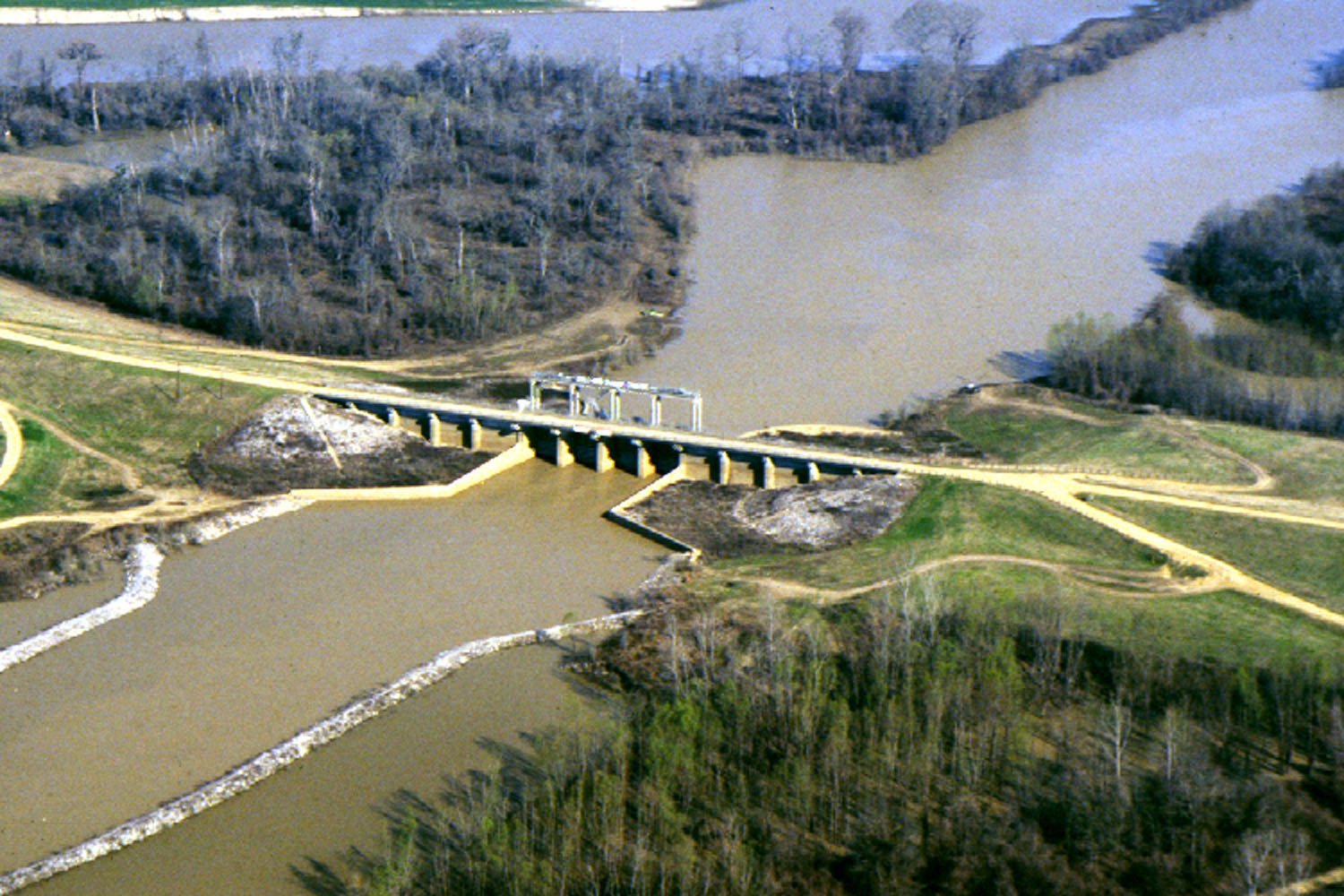
- A control structure on the Yazoo River
- Yazoo River

Location
- Country: United States
- States: Mississippi; Louisiana
- Counties: Leflore; Holmes; Humphreys; Yazoo; Sharkey; Issaquena; Warren
- Parish: Madison

Physical characteristics
- Source: Confluence of Tallahatchie and Yalobusha rivers
  - location: Greenwood, Mississippi
  - coordinates: 33°33′23″N 90°11′01″W
- Mouth: Mississippi River
  - location: Vicksburg, Mississippi
  - coordinates: 32°20′02″N 90°54′10″W
- Length: 188 miles (303 km)

Basin features
- River system: Mississippi River
- Cities: Greenwood; Belzoni; Yazoo City; Vicksburg

The Yazoo River is a river primarily in the U.S. state of Mississippi. It marks the eastern boundary of the Mississippi Delta, a broad floodplain that was cultivated for cotton plantations before the American Civil War. It continues to be devoted to large-scale agriculture.

== History ==
The Yazoo River was named by French explorer La Salle in 1682 as "Rivière des Yazous" in reference to the Yazoo tribe living near the river's mouth at its confluence with the Mississippi. The exact meaning of the term is unclear. One long-held belief is that it means "river of death".

The river is 188 miles (303 km) long and is formed by the confluence of the Tallahatchie and the Yalobusha Rivers, where modern Greenwood developed. The river parallels the Mississippi River in the latter's floodplain for some distance before joining it north of Vicksburg, Mississippi. Natural levees, which flank the Mississippi, prevent the Yazoo from joining it before Vicksburg. A "yazoo stream" is a hydrologic term that was coined to describe any river or major stream with similar characteristics. Potamologists believe the Yazoo River had its origins as the lower Ohio River.

The French (and later the Anglo-American settlers) historically called the surrounding area of Mississippi and Alabama the Yazoo lands, after the river. This became the basis for naming the Yazoo land scandal of the late 18th and early 19th centuries.

The river was of major importance during the American Civil War. The Confederates used the first electrically detonated underwater mine in the river in 1862 near Vicksburg to sink the Union ironclad USS Cairo. The last section of the Cairo was raised on December 12, 1964. It has been restored and is on permanent display to the public at the Vicksburg National Military Park. Twenty-nine sunken ships from the Civil War rest beneath the waters of the river. The steamer Dew Drop was reportedly sunk near Roebuck Lake as an obstruction to the United States Navy, but Union sources claim the vessel was captured and burned.

Variant names of the Yazoo River include Zasu River, Yazous River, Yahshoo River, Rivière des Yasoux, and Fiume del Yasous.

In 1876, the Mississippi River changed its course, shifting west several miles and leaving Vicksburg without a river front. In 1902, the U.S. Army Corps of Engineers diverted the Yazoo River into the old riverbed, forming the Yazoo Diversion Canal. The modern-day port of Vicksburg is still located on this canal. Commercial navigation of the Yazoo River has declined considerably since the 1990s, and is mainly concentrated on the section from Vicksburg to Yazoo City.

At Long Lake, Mississippi, the river flows 18,486 cubic feet per second (31,408 m^{3}/min).

== Gallery ==
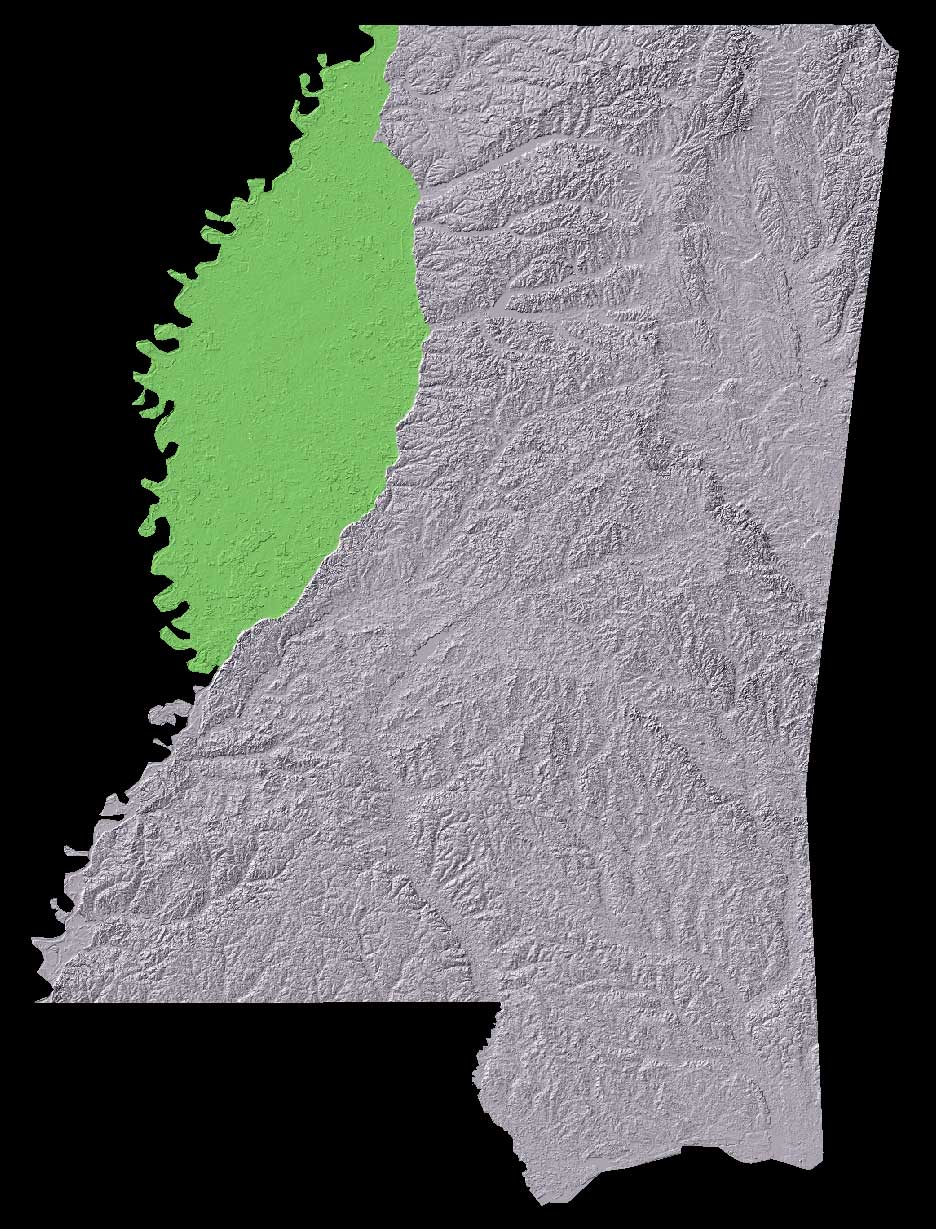
Outline of the Mississippi Delta region, through which the Yazoo River runs

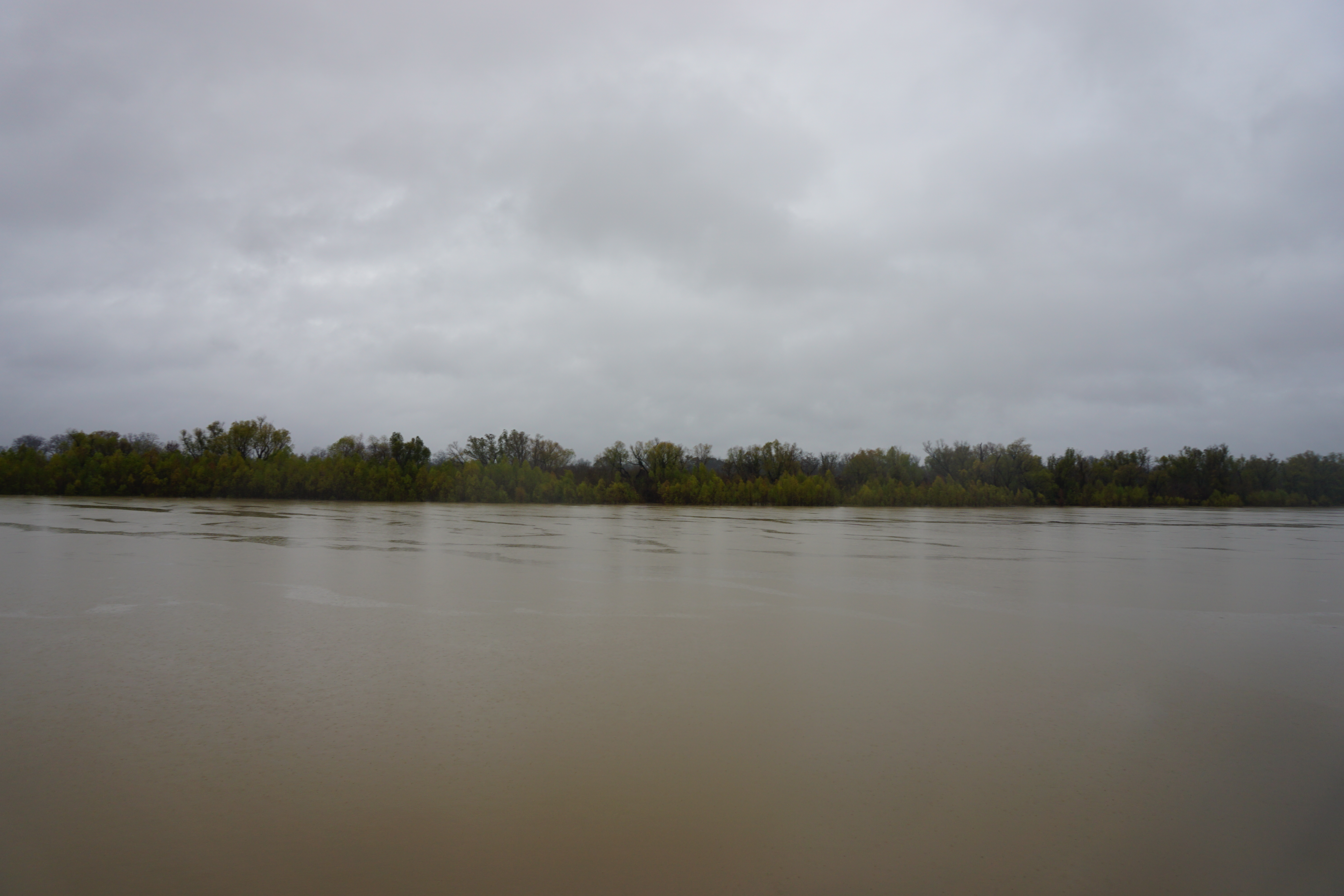
Yazoo River in Vicksburg, Mississippi

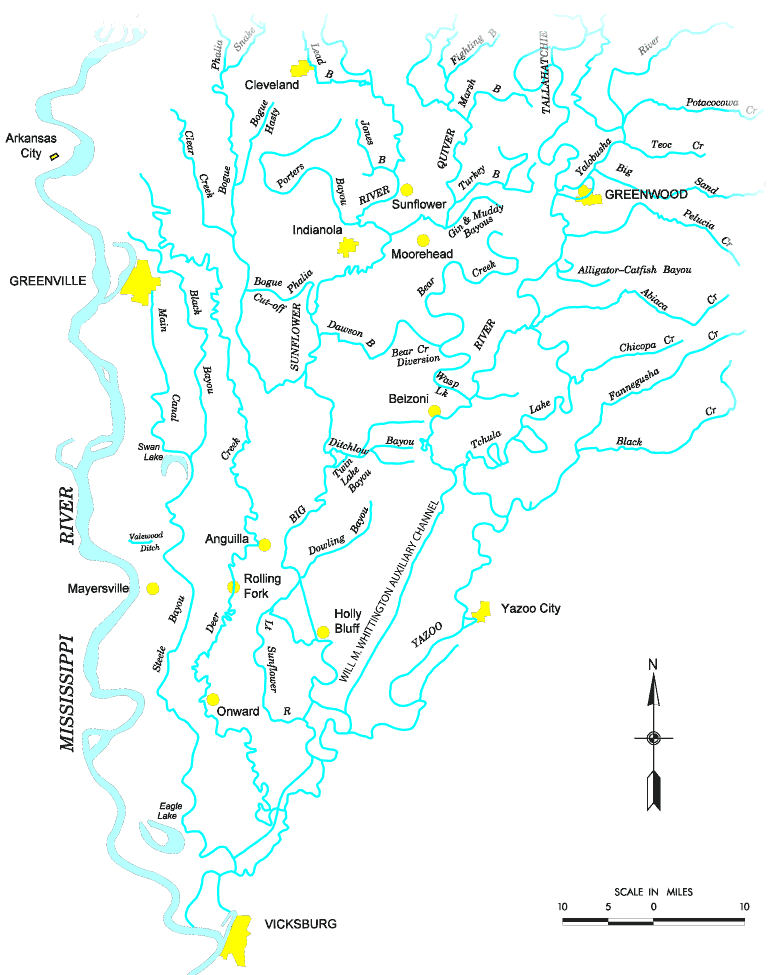
Yazoo River flows from Greenwood to Vicksburg. Not all tributaries are shown.

== See also ==
- Flood Control Act of 1937
- List of rivers of Mississippi
