= List of steam gunboats of the United States Navy =

Ships of the United States Navy

Ships in current service
- Current ships

Ships grouped alphabetically
- A–B; C; D–F; G–H; I–K; L; M; N–O; P; Q–R; S; T–V; W–Z

Ships grouped by type
- Aircraft carriers; Airships; Amphibious warfare ships; Auxiliaries; Battlecruisers; Battleships; Cruisers; Destroyers; Destroyer escorts; Destroyer leaders; Escort carriers; Frigates; Hospital ships; Littoral combat ships; Mine warfare vessels; Monitors; Oilers; Patrol vessels; Registered civilian vessels; Sailing frigates; Steam frigates; Steam gunboats; Ships of the line; Sloops of war; Submarines; Torpedo boats; Torpedo retrievers; Unclassified miscellaneous; Yard and district craft

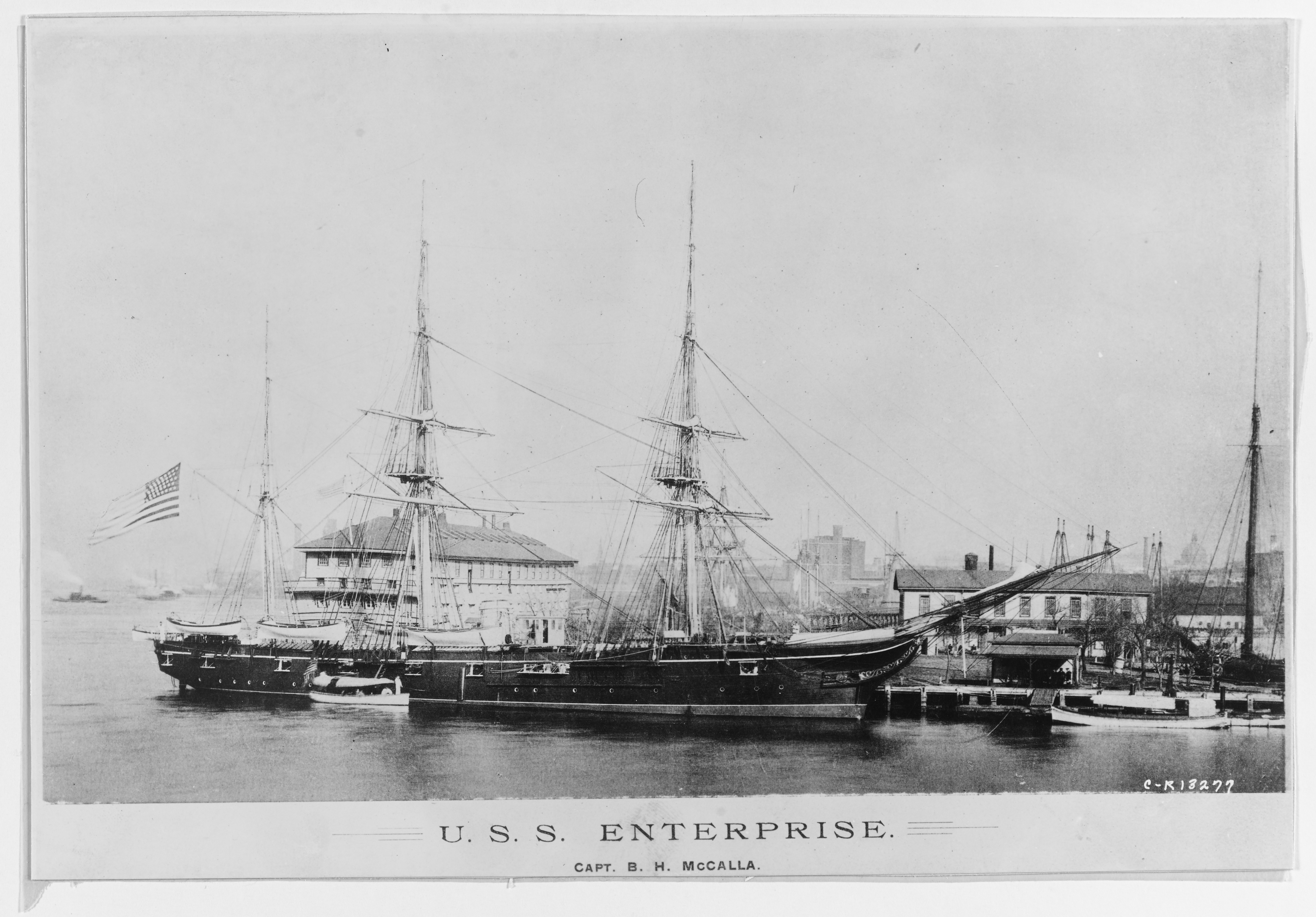
USS Enterprise circa 1890

== Unadilla class ==
- USS Aroostook (1861)
- USS Cayuga (1861)
- USS Chippewa (1861)
- USS Chocura (1861)
- USS Huron (1861)
- USS Itasca (1861)
- USS Kanawha (1861)
- USS Katahdin (1861)
- USS Kennebec (1861)
- USS Kineo (1862)
- USS Marblehead (1861)
- USS Ottawa (1861)
- USS Owasco (1861)
- USS Pembina (1861)
- USS Penobscot (1861)
- USS Pinola (1861)
- USS Sagamore (1861)
- USS Saginaw (1860)
- USS Sciota (1861)
- USS Seneca (1861)
- USS Tahoma (1861)
- USS Unadilla (1861)
- USS Winona (1861)
- USS Wissahickon (1861)

== Octorara class ==
- USS Cimarron (1862)
- USS Conemaugh (1862)
- USS Genesee (1862)
- USS Mahaska (1861)
- USS Maratanza (1862)
- USS Miami (1861)
- USS Octorara (1861)
- USS Paul Jones (1862)
- USS Port Royal (1862)
- USS Sebago (1861)
- USS Sonoma (1862)
- USS Tioga (1862)

== Kansas class ==
- USS Kansas (1863)
- USS Maumee (1864)
- USS Nipsic (1863)
- USS Nyack (1863)
- USS Pequot (1863)
- USS Saco (1863)
- USS Shawmut (1863)
- USS Yantic (IX-32)

== Sassacus class ==
- USS Agawam (1863)
- USS Algonquin (1863)
- USS Ascutney (1862)
- USS Chenango (1863)
- USS Chicopee (1863)
- USS Eutaw (1863)
- USS Iosco (1864)
- USS Lenapee (1863)
- USS Mackinaw (1863)
- USS Massasoit (1863)
- USS Mattabesett (1864)
- USS Mendota (1863)
- USS Metacomet (1863)
- USS Mingoe (1863)
- USS Osceola (1863)
- USS Otsego (1863)
- USS Pawtuxet (1864)
- USS Peoria (1863)
- USS Pontiac (1864)
- USS Pontoosuc (1864)
- USS Sassacus (1862)
- USS Shamrock (1863)
- USS Tacony (1863)
- USS Tallahoma (1862)
- USS Tallapoosa (1863)
- USS Wateree (1863)
- USS Winooski (1863)
- USS Wyalusing (1863)

== Mohongo class ==
- USS Ashuelot (1865)
- USS Mohongo (1864)
- USS Monocacy (1864)
- USS Muscoota (1864)
- USS Shamokin (1864)
- USS Suwanee (1864)
- USS Winnipec (1864)

== Enterprise class ==
- USS Adams (1874)
- USS Alliance (1877)
- USS Enterprise (1874)
- USS Essex (1874)
- USS Nipsic (1863)

== Alert class ==
- USS Alert (AS-4)
- USS Huron (1875)
- USS Ranger (1876)

== Other ==
- USS Albany (1864)
- USS Worcester (1866)
- USS Severn (1867)
- USS Congress (1868)
- USS Algoma (1868)
- USS Alaska (1868)
- USS Omaha (1869)
- USS Plymouth (1867)
- USS Galena (1880)
- USS Mohican (1883)
- USS Nantasket (1867)
- USS Peoria (1898)
- USS Quinnebaug (1866)
- USS Resaca (1865)
- USS Swatara (1865)
- USS Quinnebaug (1875)
- USS Swatara (1872)
- USS Vandalia (1876)
- USS East Boston

== Bibliography ==
- Silverstone, Paul H. (2006). Civil War Navies 1855–1883. The U.S. Navy Warship Series. New York: Routledge. ISBN 978-0-415-97870-5.
