= Peirce Crosby =

United States Navy admiral

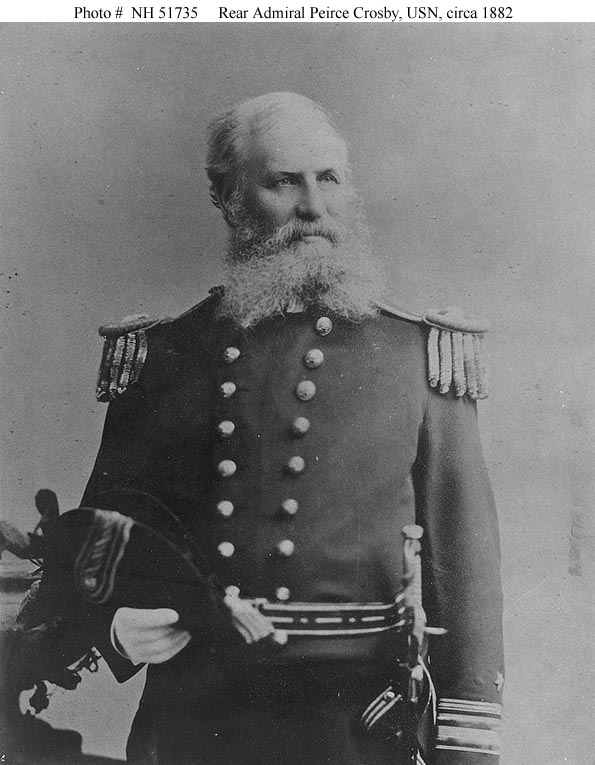
- Rear Admiral Peirce Crosby, c.1882
- Born: January 16, 1824; Upper Chichester Township, Pennsylvania, US
- Died: June 15, 1899 (aged 75); Washington, D.C., US
- Burial place: Arlington National Cemetery
- Military career
- Allegiance: United States of America
- Branch: United States Navy
- Service years: 1838–1883
- Rank: Rear admiral
- Commands: Pembina; Pinola; Sangamon; Florida; Keystone State; Metacomet; Shamokin; Powhatan; South Atlantic Squadron; Asiatic Squadron
- Conflicts: Mexican–American War; American Civil War

Peirce Crosby (January 16, 1824 – June 15, 1899) was a rear admiral in the United States Navy, whose active duty career included service in the Mexican–American War and the Civil War.

== Early life and career ==
Born in Upper Chichester Township, Delaware County, Pennsylvania, Crosby is a descendant of John Morton, signer of the U.S. Declaration of Independence. Crosby was appointed midshipman in June 1838. He reached the rank of Lieutenant in September 1853 after a decade and a half in ships of the Home and Mediterranean Squadrons, plus coast survey duty. He served in the sloop-of-war Decatur and the schooner Petrel in the Mexican–American War, and had shore assignments in and around Philadelphia, Pennsylvania.

From late 1853 until the outbreak of the Civil War in the spring of 1861, Lieutenant Crosby served in the sloops of war Germantown, of the Brazil Squadron, and Saratoga, and on board the receiving ship Princeton at Philadelphia.

== Civil War ==
During April–October 1861, as the Civil War ran through its first half year, Crosby served in the sloop of war Cumberland and briefly commanded the new gunboat Pembina. He went to the Gulf of Mexico as Commanding Officer of the gunboat Pinola at the beginning of 1862. In Pinola, assisted by Itasca, he broke the chain barrier across the Mississippi to make possible the passage upriver of Flag Officer David Farragut's squadron, and the capture of New Orleans.

For two years beginning in November 1862, Crosby helped enforce the blockade of the Confederacy's East Coast as Commanding Officer of the steamers Sangamon, Florida and Keystone State, and as Fleet Captain of the North Atlantic Blockading Squadron.

He finished the war in the Gulf, commanding the gunboat Metacomet, and took part in clearing mines from Mobile Bay.

== Post-Civil War activities ==
Commander Crosby spent the first three years of the post-Civil War era in the south Atlantic as Commanding Officer of the gunboat Shamokin. Following promotion to Captain in May 1868, he had a variety of shore assignments and, in 1872–1873, commanded the steamer Powhatan. In 1877–1881, in the rank of Commodore, Crosby was commandant of the League Island (Philadelphia) Navy Yard.

== Flag assignments and retirement ==
He finished his active career as a Rear Admiral, commanding the South Atlantic Squadron in 1882–1883 and the Asiatic Squadron later in 1883. In October of the latter year he was placed on the Retired List.

Late in his life, Admiral Crosby served as the Assistant Secretary of State in Washington, D.C.

Admiral Crosby was an early member of the Military Order of Foreign Wars and one of a very few members who were veterans of the Mexican War.

Admiral Peirce Crosby died at Washington, D.C., on June 15, 1899, and is buried in Arlington National Cemetery.

== Namesake ==
The destroyer USS Crosby (DD-164) was named after him.

Military offices
Preceded by John M. B. Clitz	Commander, Asiatic Squadron; 21 April 1883–30 October 1883	Succeeded by Joseph S. Skerrett
