= John B. Frisbee =

- Born: January 7, 1825; Phippsburg, Maine
- Died: September 9, 1903 (aged 78)
- Burial place: Winnegance, Maine
- Military career
- Allegiance: United States
- Branch: United States Navy
- Service years: 1861 - 1863
- Rank: Gunner's Mate
- Unit: (United States Navy) USS Pinola
- Conflicts: American Civil War • Battle of Forts Jackson and St. Philip
- Awards: Medal of Honor

John B. Frisbee (January 7, 1825 – September 9, 1903) was a Union Navy sailor in the American Civil War and a recipient of the U.S. military's highest decoration, the Medal of Honor, for his actions at the Battle of Forts Jackson and St. Philip.

== Biography ==
Frisbee was born on January 7, 1825, in Phippsburg, Maine. He joined the Navy from Brookline, Massachusetts, in August 1861, and served during the Civil War as a gunner's mate on the USS Pinola. At the Battle of Forts Jackson and St. Philip near New Orleans on April 24, 1862, Pinola's berth deck was struck by shellfire and set aflame. Frisbee prevented the fire from spreading to the ship's stored gunpowder by shutting himself into the magazine. For this action, he was awarded the Medal of Honor a year later on April 3, 1863. He was discharged in October 1863.

Frisbee's official Medal of Honor citation reads:

The President of the United States of America, in the name of Congress, takes pleasure in presenting the Medal of Honor to Gunner's Mate John B. Frisbee, United States Navy, for extraordinary heroism in action while serving on board the U.S. Steam Gunboat Pinola during action against Forts Jackson and St. Philip, Louisiana, and during the taking of New Orleans, 24 April 1862. While engaged in the bombardment of Fort St. Philip, Gunner's Mate Frisbee, acting courageously and without personal regard, closed the powder magazine which had been set afire by enemy shelling and shut off his avenue of escape, thereby setting a high example of bravery. He served courageously throughout these engagements which resulted in the taking of the Forts Jackson and St. Philip and in the surrender of New Orleans.

Frisbee died on September 9, 1903, at age 78 and was buried in Winnegance, Maine.

== See also ==
- List of American Civil War Medal of Honor recipients: A–F
