= USS Katahdin (1861) =

Gunboat of the United States Navy

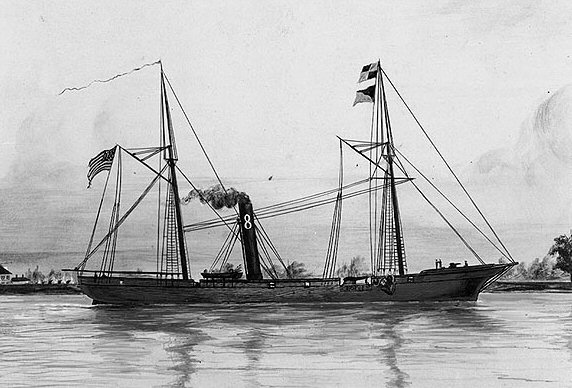
- Contemporary sketch of USS Katahdin operating on the Mississippi River

History
- Launched: 12 October 1861 at Bath, Maine
- Commissioned: 17 February 1862 at the Boston Navy Yard
- Decommissioned: 14 July 1865 at New York City
- Fate: sold, 30 November 1865

General characteristics
- Class & type: Unadilla-class gunboat
- Displacement: 691 tons
- Tons burthen: 507
- Length: 158 ft (48 m) (waterline)
- Beam: 28 ft (8.5 m)
- Draft: 9 ft 6 in (2.90 m) (max.)
- Depth of hold: 12 ft (3.7 m)
- Propulsion: 2 × 200 IHP 30-in bore by 18 in stroke horizontal back-acting engines; single screw
- Sail plan: Two-masted schooner
- Speed: 10 kn (11.5 mph)
- Complement: 114
- Armament: Original: 1 × 11-in Dahlgren smoothbore; 2 × 24-pdr smoothbore; 2 × 20-pdr Parrott rifle

USS Katahdin was a Unadilla-class gunboat built for the U.S. Navy during the American Civil War.

Katahdin was outfitted as a gunboat with cannon and rifled gun for blockade duty and two howitzers for shore bombardment.

== Built in Bath, Maine, in 1861 ==
The "90-day gunboat" was launched by Larrabee & Allen of Bath, Maine, on 12 October 1861, and commissioned at Boston Navy Yard on 17 February 1862, with Lieutenant George Henry Preble in command.

== Civil War service ==
=== Assigned to the West Gulf blockade ===
Katahdin was assigned to the West Gulf Blockading Squadron to bolster its strength as Flag Officer David Farragut prepared for his epochal attack on New Orleans. After entering the Mississippi River early in April, Katahdin assisted Farragut in his unprecedented effort to work the squadron's deep-draft, salt-water ships across the bar into the river.

On 16 April she moved up the river with the fleet to a position below Fort Jackson and Fort St. Philip guarding the approaches to New Orleans with over 100 guns. The next morning a Confederate steamer came down and fired at the fleet; but, when Katahdin's guns answered briskly the Southern ship retired out of range. The following day the mortar flotilla opened an intensive bombardment of the forts which continued intermittently for the next six days until it reached a mighty crescendo in the small hours of 24 April as the Union fleet got underway and headed up the river toward the forts.

=== Racing past Forts Jackson and St. Philip ===
Half an hour later, when the Confederate guns opened fire, Katahdin steamed steadily ahead, replying with all her guns. Only two rounds struck the gunboat during the dash, one damaging the foremast and the other the smokestack.

After passing the forts and sailing beyond the range of their artillery, the Union ships anchored opposite Quarantine abreast a Confederate encampment which raised a white flag. During the morning she collected ordnance surrendered by Confederate troops ashore. The next day she proceeded up the river firing on and silencing Southern batteries on both banks. The afternoon, upon arriving New Orleans, Louisiana, with the fleet, she captured schooner John Gilpin with a cargo of cotton.

=== Lower Mississippi River operations ===
Katahdin operated in the vicinity of New Orleans until 16 May when she got underway up river to join the squadron, which had proceeded her to Vicksburg, Mississippi. While moving up stream, she gathered valuable information about conditions in the Mississippi valley; and, throughout Farragut's operations above Vicksburg, she continued to perform reconnaissance missions as she convoyed vessels which supplied the force at Vicksburg from New Orleans.

In July, when Farragut withdrew from the Mississippi River to attend to his blockaders in the gulf, he left Katahdin in the river with Essex, Sumter, and Kineo to protect Army units in the area and to police the river. During much of this time Katahdin was stationed at Baton Rouge.

On 5 August Confederates attacked the Union encampment at Baton Rouge in force. The gunboats supported the badly outnumbered Northern soldiers enabling them to repulse the attack. Then they fired over the town into the Confederate camp, forcing them to withdraw out of range. The next morning Kineo and Katahdin guarded the right flank of the Union Army while Essex and Cayuga got underway to engage ironclad ram CSS Arkansas. However, as the Union warships were closing on Arkansas, the ram's engines failed leaving her unable to flee or fight; she was set afire by her officers and abandoned before she blew up.

For the next fortnight the threat of an attack kept the ships constantly on the alert to protect the troops which depended upon naval fire support. Finally, upon orders from General Butler, the Union Army evacuated Baton Rouge 21 August. Just before embarking the troops, the gunboats beat off an attack on the Union pickets with rapid and heavy fire. Katahdin brought up the rear as the ships steamed to New Orleans, where they arrived the following morning.

=== Supporting Union troops at Donaldsonville ===
After repairs at New Orleans, the gunboat stood up the river 5 September with Kineo and Scioto scouring the banks for information. With Itasca she covered the landing of Army troops 22 September at Donaldsonville, Louisiana. While the expedition was ashore, the gunboats protected them; and, shortly before the soldiers reembarked, naval gunfire beat back a Southern attack which threatened to cut off the landing party. This support prevented annihilation of the landing party by vastly superior forces and enabled it to retreat to Laurel Hill for passage to safety in New Orleans.

=== Capturing a large herd of cattle ===
In the months that followed, the gunboats constantly patrolled the river to protect Union communications, to gather information on Confederate activity, and to cut the flow across the Mississippi River of food and men to Confederate armies in the East. With 3 other gunboats Katahdin intercepted a drove of some 1,500 cattle from Texas and loaded them on transports for passage to New Orleans. The value of this beef to the South can be attested by the fact that, four miles below Donaldsonville, about 3,000 infantrymen supported by nine field pieces struck back at the ships in a desperate attempt to recapture the cattle. The gunboats opened promptly and in about 20 minute drove the Confederates from their position.

The months that followed were a period of constant stress and peril for the gunboats. "We are constantly under fire ... as we pass up and down the river," Lt. Roe, the commanding officer of Katahdin, reported.

Our fighting is a savage Indian warfare. The troops and guns are concealed, and watch for us as we pass along and fire and flee.

=== Blockading the Texas coast ===
In January 1863 Katahdin was ordered to reinforce the blockade off Galveston, Texas after that port had been recaptured by the Confederacy on New Year's Day. While serving in the Gulf off the Texas coast, Katahdin and Owasco' chased, captured, and burned blockade running schooner Hanover 10 May 1863. She captured schooner Excelsior 13 July off San Luis Pass, Texas.

Thereafter Katahdin continued to serve in the blockade of the Texas coast, cutting off supplies sorely needed by the Confederates. On 30 April 1864 she chased the former revenue cutter Harriet Lane and steamer Alice as they escaped from Galveston; but, after a brisk and lengthy race, Katahdin was finally outdistanced. She was more successful 31 October when the gunboat overtook Albert Edward as the British schooner tried to slip out of the same port with a cargo of cotton.

== Post-war decommissioning ==
After the Confederate collapse in April 1865, the veteran gunboat returned north and decommissioned 14 July 1865. Katahdin was sold at New York City 30 November and documented as Juno 20 October 1866.
