= Unadilla-class gunboat =

Class of US gunboats

- USS Chippewa, a Unadilla-class gunboat, 1861

Class overview
- Name: Unadilla or "90-day" class
- Builders: See table
- Operators: U.S. Navy
- Cost: $90,000–$103,500
- Built: 1861–62
- In service: 1861–1885?
- In commission: 30 Sep 1861–18 Sep 1869
- Completed: 23
- Active: None

General characteristics
- Class & type: Unadilla-class gunboat
- Displacement: 691 tons
- Tons burthen: 507
- Length: 158 ft (48 m) (waterline)
- Beam: 28 ft (8.5 m)
- Draft: 9 ft 6 in (2.90 m) (max.)
- Depth of hold: 12 ft (3.7 m)
- Propulsion: 2 × 200 IHP 30-in bore by 18 in stroke horizontal back-acting engines; single screw
- Sail plan: Two-masted schooner
- Speed: 10 kn (11.5 mph)
- Complement: 114
- Armament: Original: 1 × 11-in Dahlgren smoothbore; 2 × 24-pounder long gun; 2 × 20-pdr Parrott rifle

The Unadilla class was a class of gunboat built for the Union Navy at the outbreak of the American Civil War. Ships of the class were also known as "90-day gunboats" due to their rapid construction. The class was designed to be fully oceangoing while having a light enough draft to be able to operate close inshore, for blockade duty or other operations in shallow waters.

Unadilla-class gunboats took part in many coastal and river operations, most notably as the bulk of the fleet which captured the vital Confederate port of New Orleans in April 1862. As blockade ships, the 23 vessels of the class captured or destroyed no fewer than 146 enemy blockade runners during the war— about 10 percent of the total number of Confederate blockade runners so neutralized.

The Unadilla class was sold off quickly by the Navy at the end of the war, most of them going into merchant service. Little is known about their subsequent careers.

== Construction and design ==
=== Development ===
With the outbreak of the American Civil War in April 1861, the U.S. Navy was faced with an urgent need for light-draft gunboats able to operate both at sea and close inshore to help enforce the Union blockade of Confederate ports. Since the Navy's Chief Engineer, Benjamin F. Isherwood, had recently designed and overseen construction at the Novelty Iron Works in New York City of the engines for two similar gunboats, built for the Imperial Russian Navy, he had to hand a ready-made design suitable for the new U.S. Navy gunboats, which was accepted by Secretary of the Navy Gideon Welles.

The two men agreed, as a time-saving measure, to award the first four engine contracts directly to the Novelty Works, dispensing with the usual tendering process; in the event, the contracts for all 23 vessels of the class would be signed between 29 June and 10 July without Congressional approval. As a result, the first four vessels of the new Unadilla class were completed in the remarkably short time of about three months, earning the class as a whole the popular name "90-day gunboats".

=== Contract distribution and cost ===
All ships of the class were built in privately owned shipyards along the Eastern seaboard. Six contracts went to New York shipbuilders, five to the State of Maine, four to Massachusetts, three each to Connecticut and Philadelphia, Pennsylvania, and one each to Delaware and Maryland. No individual shipyard built more than one ship. By contrast, reflecting the relative strength of the States' industrial bases, more than half the machinery contracts went to New York-based companies—seven to the Novelty Works, three to the Morgan Iron Works and two to the Allaire Works—while Pennsylvania companies accounted for another four, Massachusetts for three, Connecticut two and Delaware and Maryland one each.

Overall cost of the individual ships varied between $90,000 and $103,500, with cost of the hulls varying between $52,000 and $58,500. The largest price differential was for the machinery contracts, the first four of which, with the Novelty Works, were for only $31,500, as opposed to the $42,000 to $46,500 for the later ships. The difference is probably due primarily to the fact that the later vessels had 60% more boiler power than the original four. Total cost of all 23 vessels was $2,170,000.

=== Hulls ===
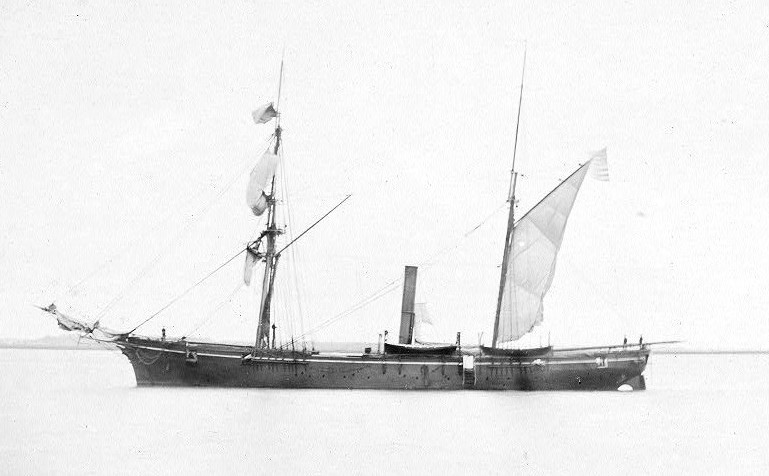
The hulls of the Unadilla-class gunboats may have been modelled on the 1860 rebuild of USS Pocahontas

The hulls of the Unadilla-class gunboats were designed by Samuel H. Pook, under the direction of the Navy's Chief of the Bureau of Construction, Equipment and Repairs, John Lenthall. The design was possibly based on the 1860 rebuild of USS Pocahontas, designed by Pook's father Samuel M. Pook. The hulls were 158 feet (48 m) in length on the waterline, with a beam of 28 feet (8.5 m), hold depth of 12 feet (3.7 m) and draft of 9 feet 6 inches (2.90 m).

Some details of the six New York-built vessels are available. These ships had frames, keels and keelsons of white oak "of the best quality", with port stanchions of locust and live oak. The keels and keelsons were fastened with corrosion-resistant copper bolts. The hulls were strengthened with diagonal iron braces, secured amidships "at the turn of the bilge" and running upward at a 45° angle to the outer frames. The ship stems were also strengthened with iron strapping. According to some sources, ships of the class were built with unseasoned timber and would therefore have been expected to have short working lives.

=== Machinery ===
The ships of the Unadilla class were each powered by a pair of 30-inch (76 cm) bore, 18-inch (46 cm) stroke horizontal back-acting engines, driving a single screw propeller.

As with the hulls, additional details for the machinery of the six New York-built ships are available; the machinery of the others was similar if not identical. The New York-built ships had two boilers each, of the Martin's vertical tubular type, placed side by side and spaced six inches apart. The boilers, "made of the best quality American charcoal iron", were 12 ft 3 in long, 8 ft 3 in wide and 9 ft 3 in high, with two furnaces each. The boilers were safety tested to a pressure of 60 psi before installation. The engines were fitted with Sewell's patent surface condensers. The ships' propellers were four-bladed, and nine feet in diameter with a mean blade pitch of 12 feet 6 inches.

Sources vary as to the speed of the ships. Some give a speed of 10 knots, but 8 to 9 knots seems to have been the typical speed during the war. Recorded speeds vary all the way from 6 knots to 11.5 knots. In all likelihood, the performance of the vessels was less than ideal in wartime conditions due to infrequency of maintenance, particularly for the boilers.

=== Launch and commission ===
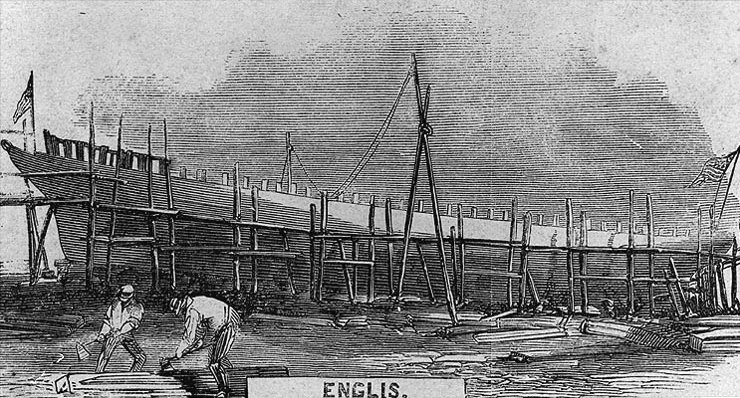
USS Unadilla under construction at the yard of John Englis, New York

The first vessel of the class, Unadilla, was launched on 17 August 1861, barely two months after the signing of the contract. The rest rapidly followed, with another three being launched in August, four in September, fourteen in October and the last one, Penobscot, in November. Unadilla was again first to be commissioned, on 30 September, just 93 days after the laying of her keel. A total of eleven were commissioned before the end of the year, and another eleven by February 1862. Marblehead was the last ship of the class to enter commission, on 8 March.

Though popularly known as the "90-day gunboats" then, only the first four vessels of the class were commissioned in anything like 90 days. The rest took an average of about three months just to launch. Overall, the ships averaged a little under six months from signing of the contract to commission.

=== Armament and complement ===
Vessels of the class were initially armed with one Dahlgren 11 in (28 cm) smoothbore cannon; two 24-pounder smoothbores and a single 20-pounder Parrott rifle. As the war continued, most of them were upgunned on an ad hoc basis, so that they ended up with a variety of different armaments.

The crew complement is listed in some recent sources as 114 officers and men; however, DANFS and other sources give varying figures for the individual ships, ranging from a complement of 65 (Sciota) to 94 (Aroostook), with an average per ship of 80. The reason for these apparent discrepancies is unknown.

=== Performance ===
Sources vary as to the performance of the Unadilla class. According to Bauer and Roberts, the ships "sailed well in a strong wind and handled easily but rolled badly." Gardiner is less generous, describing the vessels as "poor sailors; their machinery frequently broke down; the steering mechanism was inefficient; and they were slow; maximum speed being 8–9 knots."

Thomas Main, a well-known contemporaneous engineer, criticized the engines of the class as "unusually heavy in all their parts", a common criticism of Isherwood's engines by private contractors. According to Main, the engines were fully 2.78 times heavier than required, leading to reduced efficiency and performance. Main notes that with a speed of only around 9 knots, the vessels were incapable of catching the faster blockade runners with speeds of 12 to 14 knots. Whatever their shortcomings, gunboats of the class were nonetheless to accumulate an "impressive" record of service during the war.

== Service history ==
Though the main task of the Unadilla class was simply to enforce the blockade of Confederate ports in line with the Anaconda Plan, many ships of the class also participated in related operations against Confederate forts and population centers along the Southern coastline and its rivers. These operations included shore raids and invasions, bombardments, and engagements with enemy land or naval forces.

=== Battle of Port Royal ===
The first major such operation involving ships of the class occurred after the U.S. Navy determined that a supply port deep in Confederate territory would be required in order to effectively enforce the blockade of the Confederate coastline. In late October 1861, a large fleet of 77 ships, including 19 warships—the largest fleet then assembled by the Navy—departed New York with the capture of Port Royal, South Carolina as its objective.

On 4 November, four gunboats of the fleet, including the Unadilla-class vessels Ottawa, Seneca and Pembina, provided protection for the survey vessel USS Vixen as the latter made soundings in Port Royal harbor. The following morning, the same three Unadilla-class ships and two other gunboats returned to the harbor to engage the Confederate forts and gauge their strength. On 7 November, the entire Naval battle fleet, including the three previously mentioned Unadilla-class vessels along with a fourth, USS Unadilla, engaged and defeated the two enemy forts, thus capturing the harbor. Port Royal would subsequently become a key supply port for the Union cause.

=== Capture of New Orleans ===
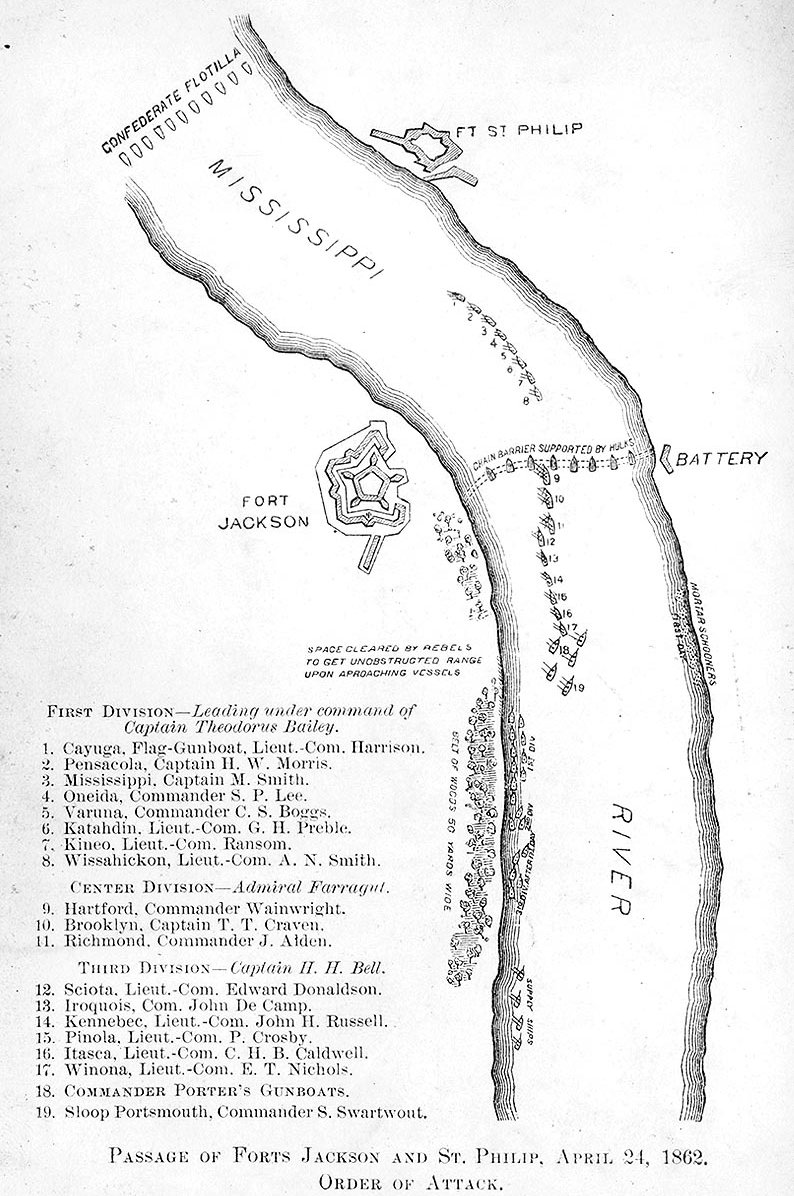
Battle of Forts Jackson and St. Philip—map and order of battle

The largest and most important contribution made by ships of the Unadilla class to a single operation was to the capture of New Orleans, the Confederacy's largest and most economically powerful city, in April 1862. For the operation, Captain David Farragut, Commander of the West Gulf Blockading Squadron, assembled a fleet of 17 warships including nine Unadilla-class gunboats: Cayuga, Itasca, Katahdin, Kennebec, Kineo, Pinola, Sciota, Winona and Wissahickon.

On the night of April 20, Farragut despatched three of his Unadilla-class gunboats, Itasca, Kineo and Pinola to remove the chains obstructing the Mississippi River below New Orleans. Though coming under heavy but inaccurate fire from Forts Jackson and St. Philip, the vessels were able to clear a narrow passage. On the night of the 24th, Farragut took the bulk of his fleet through the passage, though three of his Unadilla-class gunboats, Itasca, Kennebec and Winona, became entangled in the river obstructions and were forced to turn back. The rest of the fleet, however, continued on to New Orleans, which was forced to capitulate a few days later.

=== Vicksburg campaign ===
The capture of New Orleans enabled Naval forces to move further north along the Mississippi to threaten the key Confederate city of Vicksburg. Several ships of the class were subsequently involved in the ensuing Vicksburg Campaign. For example, in June 1862, several vessels of the class were involved in the "run past Vicksburg" to link up with the naval forces of the upper Mississippi, although this action proved to be of little significance. In August, Cayuga, Katahdin, Kineo and Sciota were involved in the Battle of Baton Rouge, and Katahdin and Winona in the recapture of the city in December. Vicksburg was however far too well defended to be threatened by the Navy, and defeat of the Confederate forces in this theater of operations was ultimately left to the Army.

=== Other actions ===
The Unadilla class was involved in numerous other operations against enemy-held territory during the war, most notably the Battle of Mobile Bay in August 1864 and the First and Second battles of Fort Fisher in December 1864 and January 1865 respectively. The main duty of the class, however, was maintenance of the blockade along the Confederate coast. While vessels of the class were too slow to catch the faster blockade runners, they nonetheless accumulated an impressive record of prizes during the war, capturing or destroying no less than 146 blockade runners during the war—almost 10% of the total number of blockade runners neutralized by the Union blockade. The most successful of the Unadillas in this regard were Sagamore, with 21 prizes; Kanawha with 19; Chocura and Penobscot with 13 each; and Owasco and Tahoma with 11 apiece.

Only one ship of the class, Sciota, was sunk during the war, but ironically this vessel was sunk on two separate occasions. The first occurred on 14 July 1863 when USS Antona collided with Sciota on the Mississippi, sinking the latter in about 12 feet of water. Sciota was raised and returned to service, but shortly after the war, on 14 July 1865—the day of Lincoln's assassination—Sciota ran onto a mine in Mobile Bay and was sunk a second time. Again she was salvaged, but this time only to be sold out of the Navy.

=== Postwar service ===
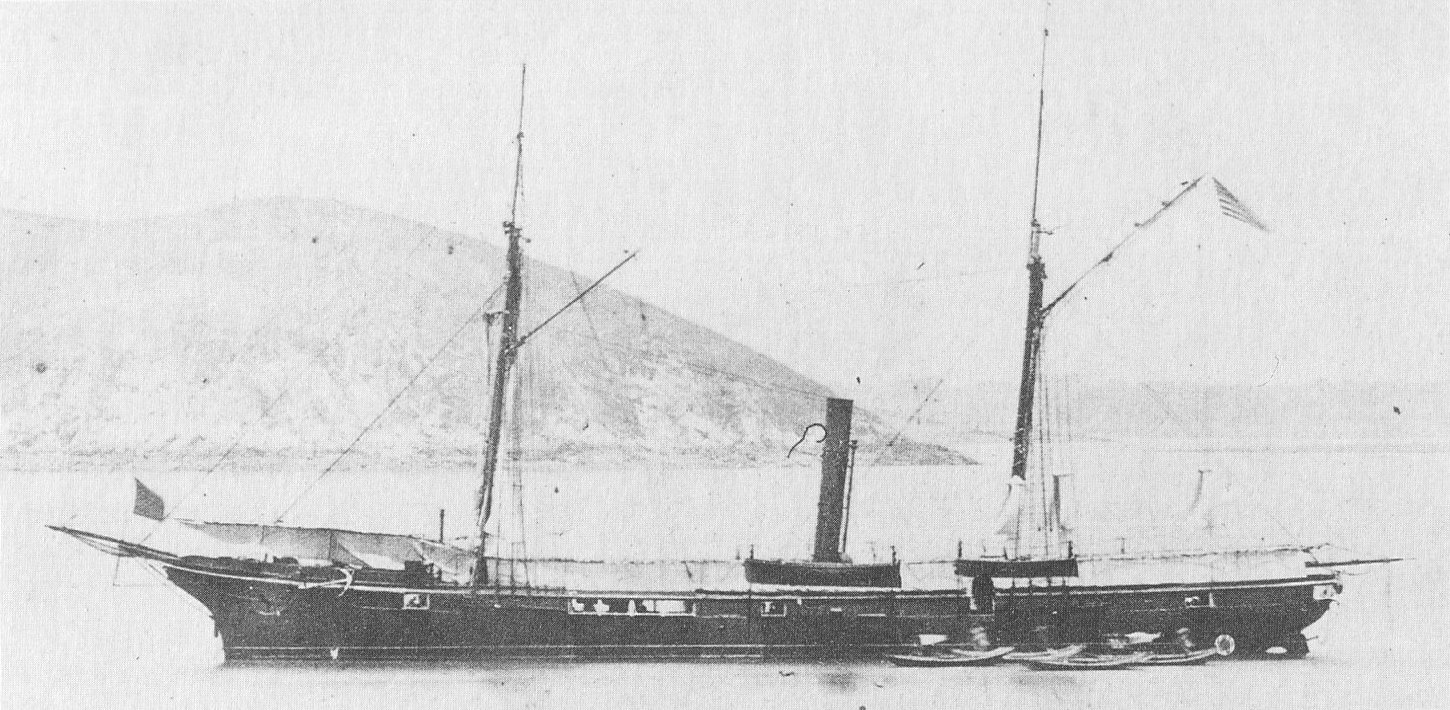
USS Aroostook in Chinese waters, ca. 1867

After the war, most of the ships of the Unadilla-class were quickly decommissioned and sold into merchant service. Seventeen had been decommissioned by August 1865, and fifteen of these had been sold by the end of the year, with the remaining two, Seneca and Penobscot, seeing no further naval service and being sold in 1868 and 1869 respectively. Some of these vessels were still in existence as late as 1885.

Of the remaining six, Chocura and Tahoma briefly saw service with the Gulf Squadron in 1866–67 before being decommissioned and sold in the latter half of 1867; Marblehead saw service with the North Atlantic Squadron, and Huron in South American waters, until their decommission in late 1868 and subsequent sale.

The last two vessels of the class to see service with the Navy, Aroostook and Unadilla, were transferred to the newly established Asiatic Squadron in 1867 and subsequently employed in the suppression of piracy along the coast of China. In June 1868, Unadilla became the first American warship to enter Siam's Chao Phraya River, bearing gifts from the President of the United States, Andrew Johnson, to Chulalongkorn, King of Siam.

In 1869, both Aroostook and Unadilla were condemned as unfit for further service due to rotting hulls—a legacy of their construction with unseasoned timber—and they were sold shortly thereafter. Unadilla became the merchant Dang Wee and was sunk in a collision off Hong Kong in the fall of 1870; Aroostook's later history, like that of most other vessels of the class, is unknown.

== List of ships ==
Unadilla-class gunboat
Name	Builder	Where built	Engine	Launch	Comm.	Decom.	Sold	Notes
Aroostook	N. L. Thompson	Kennebunk, ME	Novelty	1861-10-19	1862-02-20	1869-09-18	1869-09-18	Asiatic Sqn. 1867–69; fate unknown
Cayuga	Gildersleeve & Sons	Portland, CT	Woodruff	1861-10-21	1862-02-21	1865-10-25	1865-10-25	Merchant Veteran; converted to bark, 1869; still extant 1885
Chippewa	Webb & Bell	New York City	Morgan	1861-09-14	1861-12-13	1865-06-24	1865-11-30	Fate unknown
Chocura	Curtis & Tilden	Boston, MA	Loring	1861-10-05	1862-02-15	1867-07-13	1867-07-13	Fate unknown
Huron	Paul Curtis	Boston, MA	Loring	1861-09-21	1862-01-08	1868-10-08	1869-06-14	Merchant D. H. Bills, 1869; still extant 1876
Itasca	Hillman & Streaker	Philadelphia, PA	Morris	1861-10-01	1861-11-28	1865-08-22	1865-11-30	Merchant Aurora 1865; sold foreign 1867
Kanawha	E.G. & W.H. Goodspeed	East Haddam, CT	Pacific	1861-10-21	1862-01-21	1865-07-05	1866-06-13	Merchant bark Mariano 1866; still extant 1878
Katahdin	Larrabee & Allen	Bath, ME	Morgan	1861-10-12	1862-02-17	1865-07-14	1865-11-30	Merchant Juno 1865; renamed Katahdin?
Kennebec	G. W. Lawrence	Thomaston, ME	Novelty	1861-10-05	1862-02-08	1865-08-09	1865-11-30	Merchant Kennebec 1865; converted to barge, date unknown
Kineo	J. W. Dyer	Portland, ME	Morgan	1861-10-09	1862-02-08	1865-05-09	1866-10-09	Merchant schooner Lucy H. Gibson, 1866
Marblehead	George W. Jackman Jr.	Newburyport, MA	Highland	1861-10-16	1862-03-08	1868-09-04	1868-09-30	Merchant bark Marblehead 1868; still extant 1876
Ottawa	J. A. Westervelt	New York, NY	Novelty	1861-08-22	1861-10-07	1865-08-12	1865-10-25	Fate unknown
Owasco	Charles Mallory & Sons	Mystic, CT	Novelty	1861-10-05	1862-01-23	1865-07-12	1865-10-25	Merchant Lulu 1865; converted to sail, 1869; extant 1885
Pembina	Thomas Stack	Williamsburg, NY	Novelty	1861-08-28	1861-10-16	1865-09-22	1865-11-30	Merchant Charles E. Gibbons, 1865; conv. to schooner, 1866; extant 1878
Penobscot	Columbus P. Carter	Belfast, ME	Allaire	1861-11-19	1862-01-16	1865-07-31	1869-10-19	Fate unknown
Pinola	John J. Abrahams	Baltimore, MD	Reeder	1861-10-03	1862-01-29	1865-07-15	1865-11-30	Merchant bark Pinola, 1865
Sagamore	A. & G.T. Sampson	Boston, MA	Atlantic	1861-09-18	1861-12-07	1864-12-01	1865-06-13	Merchant Kaga no Kami, 1865; renamed Hijun 1868; Jap. warship Yoshun, 1868; Chinese merchant Daimyo
Sciota	Jacob Birely	Philadelphia, PA	Morris	1861-10-15	1861-12-15	1865	1865-10-25	Sunk in collision w. USS Antona, 14 Jul 1863; salvaged; returned to service; mined in Mobile Bay, AL, 14 Apr 1865; salvaged and sold
Seneca	Jeremiah Simonson	New York, NY	Novelty	1861-08-27	1861-10-14	1865-06-24	1868-09-10	Fate unknown
Tahoma	W. & A. Thatcher	Wilmington, DE	Reaney	1861-10-02	1861-12-20	1867-08-27	1867-10-7	Fate unknown
Unadilla	John Englis	New York, NY	Novelty	1861-08-17	1861-09-30	1869?	1869-11-09	Asiatic Sqn. 1867–68; merchant Dang Wee, 1869; sunk in collision, 1870
Winona	C. & R. Poillon	New York, NY	Allaire	1861-09-14	1861-12-11	1865-06-09	1865-11-30	Merchant C. L. Taylor 1865; extant 1885
Wissahickon	John W. Lynn	Philadelphia, PA	Merrick	1861-10-02	1861-11-25	1865-07-01	1865-10-25	Merchant Adele, 1865; extant 1885

TABLE LEGEND: Name = name of ship. Builder = shipbuilder. Built = where built. Engine = builder of engines and machinery; abbreviations as follows: Allaire = Allaire Iron Works, NY; Highland = Highland Iron Works, Newburgh, NY; Loring = Harrison Loring, Boston, MA; Merrick = Merrick & Sons, Philadelphia, PA; Morgan = Morgan Iron Works, NY; Morris = I. P. Morris & Co., Philadelphia, PA; Novelty = Novelty Iron Works, NY; Pacific = Pacific Iron Works, Bridgeport, CT; Reaney = Reaney, Son & Archbold, Chester, PA; Reeder = Charles Reeder, Baltimore, MD; Woodruff = Woodruff & Beach, Hartford, CT. Launch = date of launch. Comm. = date of commission. Decom. = date of decommission. Sold = date of sale.

Sources for the table: Bauer and Roberts, pp. 74–75; Silverstone, pp. 49–54.

== See also ==
Media related to Unadilla class gunboat at Wikimedia Commons

== Citation sources ==
Books

- Bauer, Karl Jack and Roberts, Stephen S. (1991): Register of Ships of the U.S. Navy, 1775-1990: Major Combatants, Greenwood Publishing Group, ISBN 978-0-313-26202-9.
- Browning, Robert M. (2002): Success Is All That Was Expected: The South Atlantic Blockading Squadron During the Civil War, pp. 21–42, Potomac Books Inc., ISBN 978-1-57488-514-9.
- Fiske, John (1900): The Mississippi Valley in the Civil War, pp. 128-129, Houghton, Mifflin & Co., Boston and New York.
- Gardiner, Robert, ed. (1992): Steam, Steel and Shellfire: The Steam Warship 1815–1905, pp. 62–63, Conway Maritime Press, ISBN 0-85177-608-6.
- Kettell, Thomas P. (1875): History of the Great Rebellion, p. 189, L. Stebbins, Connecticut.
- Main, Thomas (1893): The Progress of Marine Engineering, From the time of Watt to the present day, pp. 188–190, 205–206; The Trade Publishing Co., New York.
- Peterson, William M. (1989). Mystic Built: Ships and Shipyards of the Mystic River, Connecticut, 1784-1919. Mystic, CT: Mystic Seaport Museum, Inc. ISBN 091337251X.
- Silverstone, Paul H. (1989): Warships of the Civil War Navies, pp. 49–54, Naval Institute Press, Maryland, ISBN 0-87021-783-6.
- Sloan, Edward William (1980): Benjamin Franklin Isherwood, Naval Engineer, pp. 30-31, Arno Press, ISBN 978-0-405-13077-9.
- Tucker, Spencer C. (2006): Blue & Gray Navies: The Civil War Afloat, p. 35, U.S. Naval Institute Press, ISBN 978-1-59114-882-1.
- Tucker, Spencer C. (2010): The Civil War Naval Encyclopedia, pp. 216–225, ABC-CLIO, ISBN 978-1-59884-338-5.

Periodicals

- Scientific American, The Baltimore Sun
