= USS Sciota (1861) =

Gunboat of the United States Navy

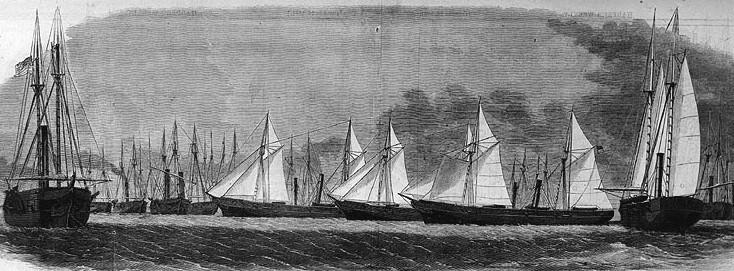
- USS Sciota (2nd ship from left)

History

United States
- Name: USS Sciota
- Builder: Jacob Birely (Philadelphia)
- Cost: $96,000
- Launched: 15 Oct 1861
- Commissioned: 15 Dec 1861
- Fate: Struck mine and sank, 14 Apr 1865; salvaged; sold 25 Oct 1865

General characteristics
- Class & type: Unadilla-class gunboat
- Displacement: 691 tons
- Tons burthen: 507
- Length: 158 ft (48 m) (waterline)
- Beam: 28 ft (8.5 m)
- Draft: 9 ft 6 in (2.90 m) (max.)
- Depth of hold: 12 ft (3.7 m)
- Propulsion: 2 × 200 IHP 30-in bore by 18 in stroke horizontal back-acting engines; single screw
- Sail plan: Two-masted schooner
- Speed: 10 kn (11.5 mph)
- Complement: 114
- Armament: Original: 1 × 11-in Dahlgren smoothbore; 2 × 24-pdr smoothbore; 2 × 20-pdr Parrott rifle

USS Sciota was a Unadilla-class gunboat built on behalf of the United States Navy for service during the Civil War. She was outfitted as a gunboat, with both a 20-pounder rifle for horizontal firing, and two howitzers for shore bombardment, and assigned to the Union blockade of the waterways of the Confederate States of America.

== Commissioned in Philadelphia in 1861 ==
The first U.S. Navy ship to be so named, USS Sciota was one of the "ninety-day gunboats" rushed through construction at the beginning of the Civil War, Sciota was laid down in the summer of 1861 at Philadelphia by Jacob Birley and J. P. Morris and Company; launched on 15 October 1861; and commissioned at the Philadelphia Navy Yard on 15 December 1861.

== Civil War service ==
=== Assigned to the Gulf Blockade ===
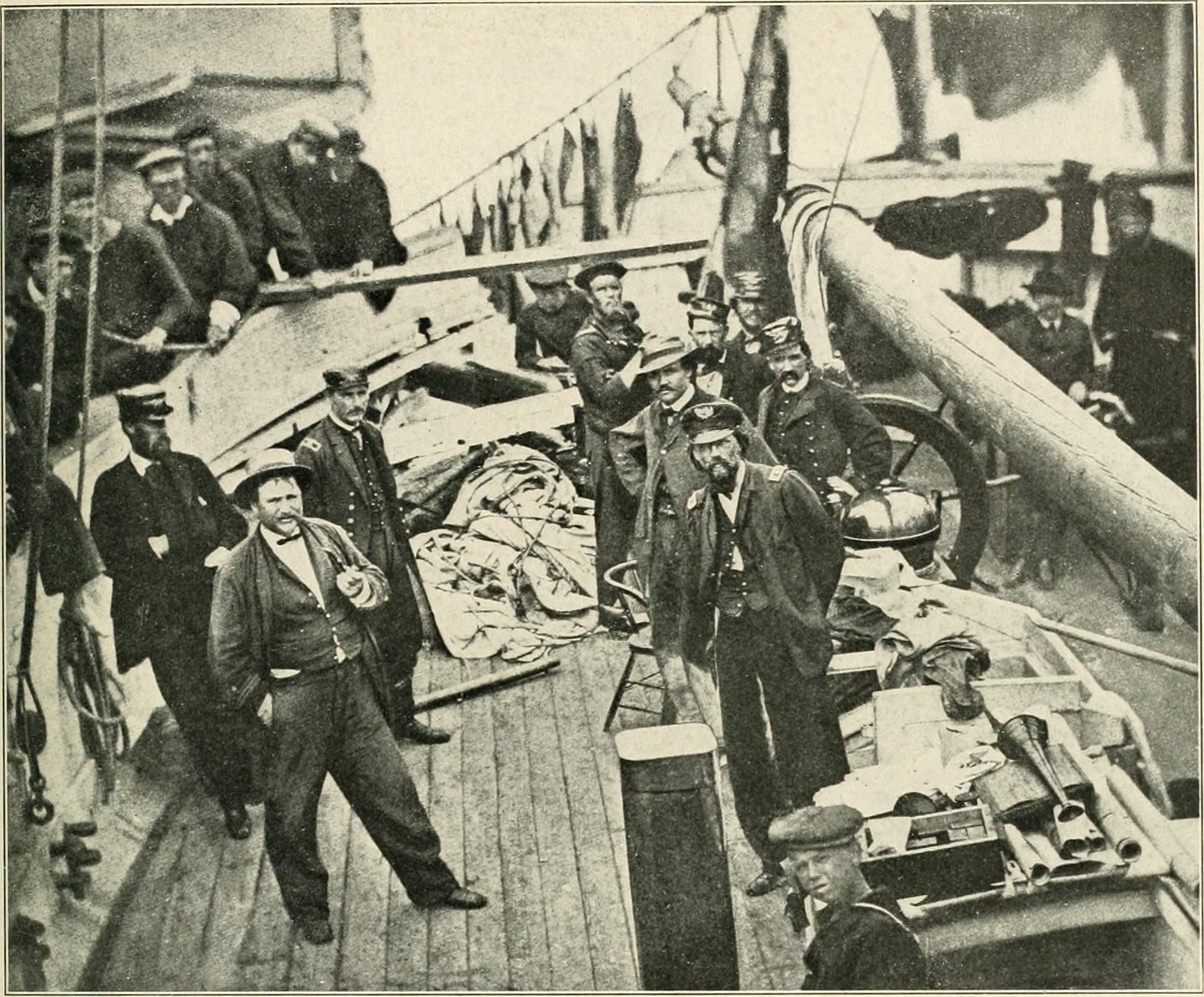
Aboard the Sciota

The new screw gunboat was assigned to the Gulf Blockading Squadron and arrived at Ship Island, Mississippi, on the afternoon of 8 January 1862. On 6 February, she captured blockade runner, Margaret, off Isle of Breton, Louisiana, as the sloop was attempting to escape to sea laden with cotton.

When Secretary of the Navy Gideon Welles divided naval jurisdiction in the Gulf of Mexico between Flag Officer William McKean and Flag Officer David Farragut, Sciota was assigned to Farragut's West Gulf Blockading Squadron which had been created to wrest New Orleans from Southern hands.

During the first weeks in April, Sciota, supported Farragut's efforts to get his deep draft ships across the bar off Pass a L'Outre and into the Mississippi River. During this period, she also steamed up the river gathering information about Southern defenses.

=== Bombarding Mississippi River forts ===
On the 18th, the ships of Farragut's fleet took position close to Fort St. Philip and Fort Jackson. Sciota bombarded these forts, and she continued to duel with the Confederate guns intermittently for the next six days.

In the early morning darkness of the 24th, Sciota got underway with the fleet and dashed up river past the forts. After New Orleans, surrendered, Sciota operated up the river with Farragut. She attacked and passed the Confederate forts at Vicksburg, Mississippi on 28 June when Farragut raced by that riverside stronghold to join Flag Officer Charles H. Davis' Western flotilla.

Since the Army was unable to provide the troops necessary for joint operations against Vicksburg, Farragut decided to return down river to turn his attention to the blockade in the western gulf. Sciota again ran the gauntlet past the Southern batteries.

The gunboat continued operations on the Mississippi below Vicksburg for much of the remainder of the year. She engaged Southern batteries at Donaldsonville, Louisiana, on 4 October. During this action at least one officer, LT Charles Swasey, was killed. He was the gunboat's executive officer.

=== Gulf of Mexico operations ===
On 3 January 1863, Farragut ordered gunboats, Sciota, Cayuga, and Hatteras to Galveston, Texas which had just been captured by the South in a surprise attack shortly after midnight on New Year's Day. On the 10th, Commodore Bell, in Brooklyn led an attack by Sciota, Owasco, and Katahdin on the Confederate batteries at Galveston. They learned that the Southern guns were capable of firing past the Union squadron-more than two and one-half miles.

After the engagement, Sciota continued to operate in the Gulf of Mexico, bolstering the still leaky blockade in the area. On 14 July 1863, she collided with the Union steamer, Antona, in the Mississippi River about eight miles above Quarantine and sank. However, she was raised late in August and taken to New Orleans to be refitted.

=== Returned to operations after having been sunk ===
The ship returned to blockade duty off the Texas coast early in December. On the last day of 1863, she and Granite City made a reconnaissance from Pass Cavallo, and landed soldiers on the gulf shore of Matagorda Peninsula in action continuing through 1 January 1864.

While Granite City covered the troops ashore from attacks by Confederate cavalry, Sciota reconnoitered the mouth of the Brazos River. Returning to the landing area, Sciota anchored close to the beach and shelled Confederate positions. Granite City steamed down to Pass Cavallo to call up Monogahela, Penobscot, and Estrella to assist. Confederate gunboat, John F. Carr, closed and fired on the Union troops,

making some very good hits ...

but was driven ashore by a severe gale and destroyed by fire. The Union troops were withdrawn on board ship. Reporting on the operation, Lt. Col. Frank S. Hasseltine wrote:

Captain Perkins, of the Sciota, excited my admiration by the daring manner in which he exposed his ship through the night in the surf till it broke all about him, that he might, close to us, lend the moral force of his ... guns ... and by his gallantry in bringing us off during the gale.

On 21 January 1864, Sciota and Granite City joined several hundred troops in a reconnaissance of the Texas coast. They covered the troops at Smith's Landing, Texas, and the subsequent foray down the Matagorda Peninsula.

On 4 April, Sciota captured the schooner Mary Sorly attempting to run the blockade at Galveston with a cargo of cotton. She had previously been United States Revenue Cutter, Dodge, seized by the Confederates at Galveston at the war's outbreak.

Sciota continued operations on the Texas coast through the summer. On 13 September, she came across a large quantity of cotton afloat at sea, picked up 83 bales, and sent them to New Orleans. On 27 October, she captured Prussian schooner, Pancha Larispa, attempting to run through the blockade into either Velasco or San Luis Pass, Texas. The next day, she took Cora Smyser while that British schooner vainly attempted the same feat.

=== Sunk while clearing mines ===
In November, Sciota was ordered to Pensacola, Florida for repairs. In January 1865, she steamed to Mobile Bay to help clear torpedoes from the waters there. On 14 April, the day of President Abraham Lincoln's assassination, she struck a torpedo and sank off Mobile, Alabama. Her commanding officer, Acting Lieutenant James W. Magune, reported:

The explosion was terrible, breaking the beams of the spar deck, tearing open the waterways, ripping off starboard forechannels, and breaking fore-topmast.

== Hulk raised and sold ==
Early in July, she was raised. Her hulk was sold at public auction at New York City on 25 October 1865.
