= USS Crosby =

Wickes-class destroyer

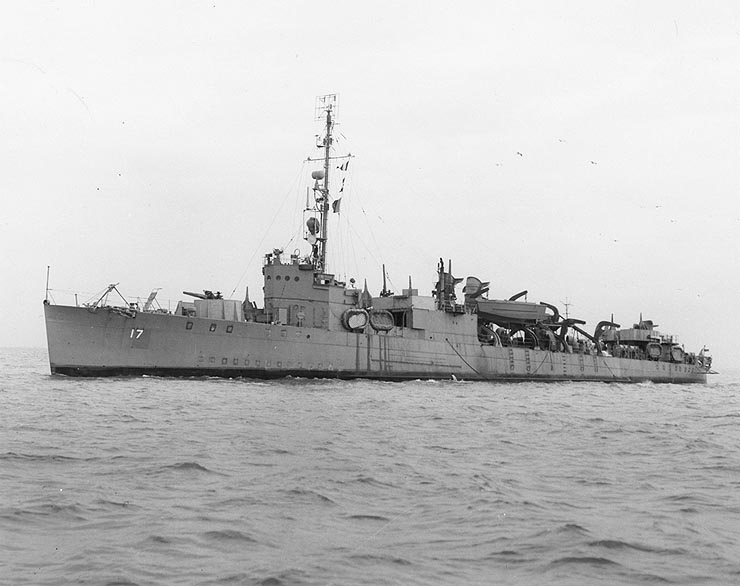
- USS Crosby off Mare Island Navy Yard, California on 24 February 1943, following conversion to a high-speed transport

History

United States
- Name: Crosby
- Namesake: Peirce Crosby
- Builder: Fore River Shipyard, Quincy, Massachusetts
- Laid down: 23 June 1918
- Launched: 28 September 1918
- Commissioned: 24 January 1919
- Decommissioned: 7 June 1922
- Identification: DD-164
- Recommissioned: 18 December 1939
- Decommissioned: 28 September 1945
- Reclassified: APD-17, 22 February 1943
- Stricken: 24 October 1945
- Fate: Sold for scrapping, 23 May 1946

General characteristics
- Class & type: Wickes-class destroyer
- Displacement: 1,060 tons
- Length: 314 ft 5 in (95.8 m)
- Beam: 31 ft 8 in (9.7 m)
- Draft: 8 ft 8 in (2.6 m)
- Speed: 35 knots (65 km/h; 40 mph)
- Complement: 113 officers and enlisted
- Armament: 4 × 4 in (102 mm)/50 guns; 2 × 3 in (76 mm)/23 guns; 12 x 21 in (533 mm) torpedo tubes; 1 × depth charge projector; 2 × depth charge tracks

USS Crosby (DD–164) was a Wickes-class destroyer in the United States Navy during World War II, later reclassified as APD-17. She was named for Admiral Peirce Crosby.

== Construction and commissioning ==
Crosby was launched on 28 September 1918 by Bethlehem Shipbuilding Corporation's Fore River Shipyard in Quincy, Massachusetts, sponsored by Mrs. C. Tittman. The ship was commissioned on 24 January 1919.

== Service history ==
After commissioning, Crosby reported to the Atlantic Fleet. She joined in exercises in Guantanamo Bay until sailing for Trepassey Bay, Newfoundland in May 1919, to serve as plane guard during the historic flight of Navy seaplanes, the first aerial crossing of the Atlantic.

On 1 July 1919, Crosby was assigned to the Pacific Fleet, and a week later she sailed from New York for San Diego, arriving on 7 August. She visited Portland, Oregon, and Seattle, Washington, then was placed in reserve status with reduced complement at San Diego on 30 January 1920. She continued in reserve and was decommissioned on 7 June 1922.

=== World War II ===
Recommissioned on 18 December 1939, Crosby sailed on Neutrality Patrol out of San Pedro on 1 April 1940. On 3 April she collided with, and sank, the fishing vessel Lone Eagle off Point Arguello, California. On 1 July 1940, she was assigned to the 11th Naval District Defense Forces, and after a reserve training cruise resumed her patrols and provided services to Destroyer Base, San Diego for the training of destroyer crews.

With the entry of the United States into the war, Crosby continued to patrol the waters of the 11th Naval District and to escort convoys locally until 1 February 1943 when she entered Mare Island Navy Yard for conversion to a high-speed transport. She was reclassified APD-17 on 22 February 1943.

Clearing San Francisco on 27 February 1943, Crosby sailed by way of Pearl Harbor, Samoa, Viti Levu, and Noumea to Espiritu Santo, arriving on 27 March for training exercises with the 4th Marines. Beginning the active service which was to bring her a Navy Unit Commendation, Crosby sailed on 29 April for Guadalcanal as a transport screen. She made two similar voyages until 6 June, and then reported for patrol and escort duty in the Solomons. Crosby aided in the consolidation of the Solomons, landing troops on New Georgia between 30 June and 5 July; on the Treasury Islands under heavy gunfire on 27 October; and on Bougainville on 6 and 17 November. She sailed on 21 November for overhaul at Brisbane, Australia, returning to Milne Bay, New Guinea on 12 December. She trained Army and Marine personnel in amphibious landings, then landed troops at Cape Gloucester, New Britain, between 24 and 29 December 1943 and at Dekays Bay, New Guinea on 2 January 1944.

Clearing Milne Bay on 6 January 1944, Crosby escorted convoys from Espiritu Santo to the Solomon Islands through January, remaining in the Solomons on antisubmarine patrol and screening duty. She landed troops on Green Island from 15 to 20 February and on Emirau Island on 20 March. Returning to the New Guinea operations on 6 April, she landed troops at Aitape on 22 and 26 April; escorted convoys to Hollandia; participated in the invasion of Biak Island on 27 May; and served as flagship for landing craft in Humboldt Bay from 31 May to 6 July. Following a brief overhaul at Manus, she landed troops on Cape Sansapor on 30 July, then sailed to Sydney, Australia, for replenishment and repairs. She returned to Humboldt Bay on 30 August and landed troops on Morotai on 15 September to complete her operations in the New Guinea area.

Crosby put out from Humboldt Bay on 12 October 1944 and put men of the 6th Rangers ashore on Suluan Island, Leyte on 17 October, for a reconnaissance mission. In preparation for the invasion landings, she landed troops on Dinagat Island, at the opening of Leyte Gulf on 19 and 20 October. Reloading troops at Humboldt Bay, she landed them in Ormoc Bay on 7 December. She recovered the survivors of Ward which was sunk by American gunfire after severe damage from Japanese kamikazes. Crosby participated in the landings on Mindoro 15 December and again returned to Humboldt Bay for additional men. After landing her troops at Lingayen Gulf on 11 January 1945, Crosby continued to support the Luzon landings, landing men successfully at Nasugbu on 31 January; Mariveles on 15 February; and Corregidor on 17 February. On 25 February she cleared for Ulithi and an overhaul.

Crosby arrived at Okinawa on 18 April and for antisubmarine patrol and radar picket duty, narrowly escaping damage from a kamikaze on 13 May. She stood out for San Francisco 18 May and arrived 19 June. Overage and badly battered from her long and strenuous service, it was considered unfeasible to repair her. Crosby was decommissioned 28 September 1945 and sold 23 May 1946, to Boston Metals Co., Baltimore Maryland.

== Awards ==
In addition to her Navy Unit Commendation, Crosby earned 10 battle stars for World War II service.

As of 2004, no other ship in the United States Navy has borne this name.
