= USS Kennebec (1861) =

Gunboat of the United States Navy

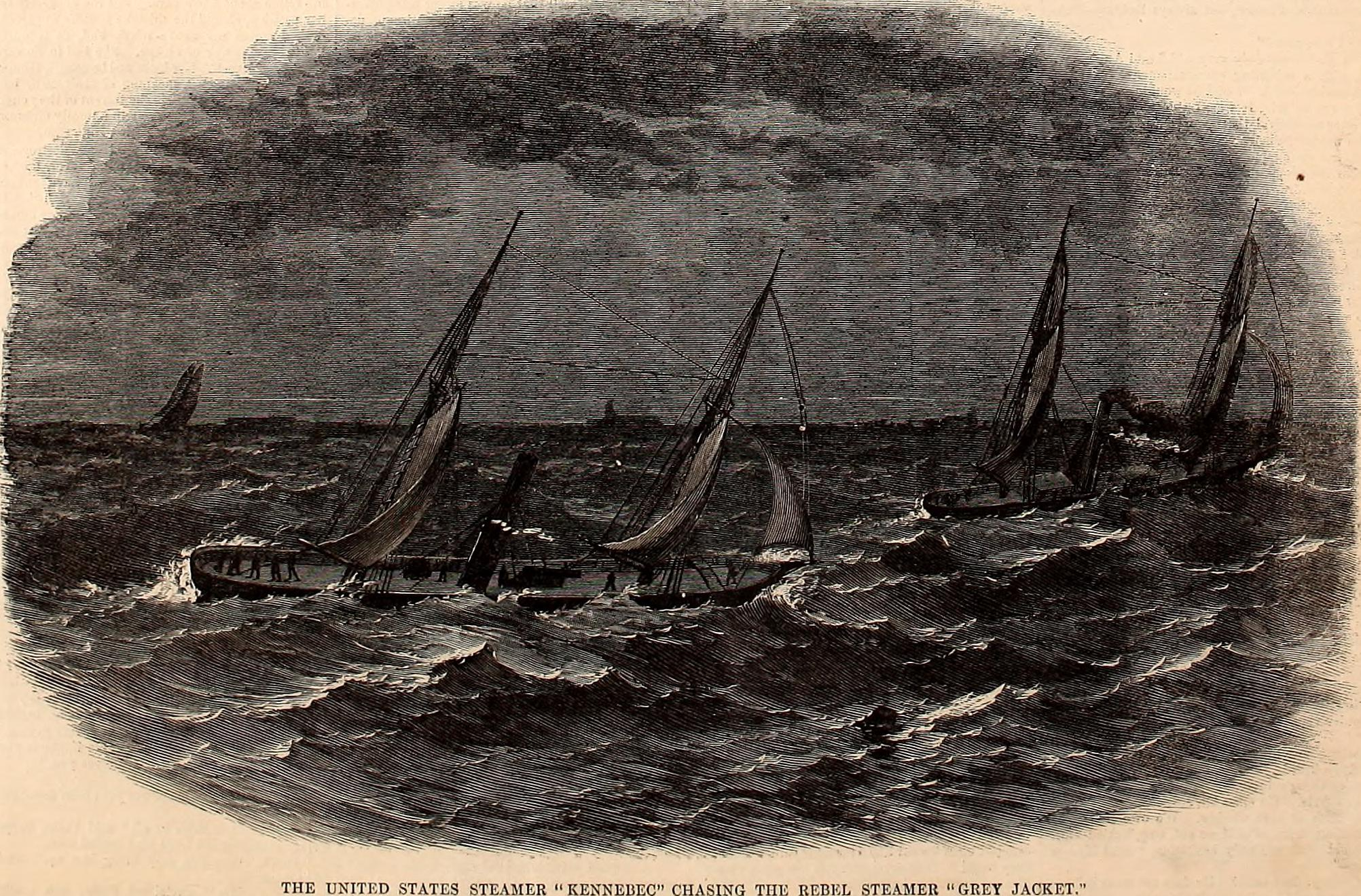
- The Kennebec chasing the rebel steamer Grey Jacket

History

United States
- Launched: 5 October 1861
- Commissioned: 8 February 1862
- Decommissioned: 9 August 1865
- Fate: Sold 30 November 1865

General characteristics
- Class & type: Unadilla-class gunboat
- Displacement: 691 tons
- Tons burthen: 507
- Length: 158 ft (48 m) (waterline)
- Beam: 28 ft (8.5 m)
- Draft: 9 ft 6 in (2.90 m) (max.)
- Depth of hold: 12 ft (3.7 m)
- Propulsion: 2 × 200 IHP 30-in bore by 18 in stroke horizontal back-acting engines; single screw
- Sail plan: Two-masted schooner
- Speed: 10 kn (11.5 mph)
- Complement: 114
- Armament: Original: 1 × 11-in Dahlgren smoothbore; 2 × 24-pdr smoothbore; 2 × 20-pdr Parrott rifle

USS Kennebec was a Unadilla-class gunboat built for the U.S. Navy following the outbreak of the American Civil War. She was named for the Kennebec River.

Kennebec was launched 5 October 1861 by G. W. Lawrence, Thomaston, Maine; and commissioned at Boston Navy Yard 8 February 1862, Lieutenant John Henry Russell in command.

== Operational history ==
=== Blockade duty ===
The new gunboat was assigned to Admiral David Farragut's newly created West Gulf Blockading Squadron and stood out to sea 12 February 1862. She reached Ship Island, Mississippi, 5 March and 3 days later crossed the bar at Pass a l'Outre and entered the Mississippi River. In the ensuing weeks she did reconnaissance and patrol duty, occasionally engaging Confederate ships chasing them upstream.

=== Attack on Forts Jackson and St. Phillip ===
On 28 March she and Wissahickon steamed up the river within sight of Fort Jackson and found the cable-linked line of hulks which the South had placed across the river to bar Farragut's invaders. After Southern batteries at the Fort opened a rapid fire on the gunboats, they retired down the river; but, from time to time thereafter, they steamed up to learn more about the Southern defenses while Farragut made ready to attack.

On 18 April a flotilla of schooners under Commander David Dixon Porter opened a steady fire on Forts Jackson and St. Philip, and maintained the barrage until it reached a crescendo on the night of 24 April as Farragut in Hartford led his fleet past the forts. Kennebec, in the gunboat division commanded by Captain Henry H. Bell, became entangled in the line of rafts which obstructed the river and struck one of the Confederate schooners. This delayed her until Admiral Farragut had completed his dash, enabling the Confederate guns fire to concentrate their fire on Kennebec, Itasca and Winona. As dawn had made their ships even more vulnerable targets, their commanders ordered the crews to lie flat on the decks while the gunboats drifted down stream out of action. However, Kennebec's disappointment was softened 4 days later when she was on hand to see the Stars and Bars at Fort Jackson lowered and the Stars and Stripes raised in their place.

=== Mississippi ===
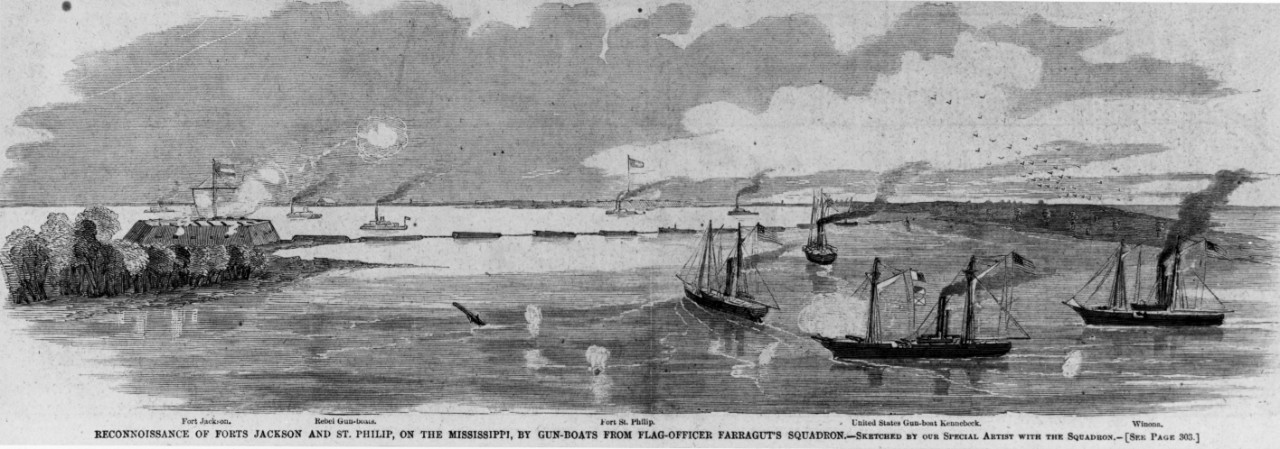
Reconnaissance of Forts Jackson and St. Philip, on the Mississippi, by gun-boats including Kennebec from Farragut's Squadron

Patrol and convoy duty up and down the Mississippi occupied Kennebec for the next 2 months. She was with Farragut below Vicksburg, Mississippi 25 June, and began a bombardment of the Confederate batteries there the next day. She remained below with Brooklyn continuing the shelling until Farragut had safely run by the Southern guns on the 28th and joined Flag Officer Charles Henry Davis above Vicksburg. The gunboat engaged batteries and snipers ashore for 2 days before heading down stream to resume escort and patrol duty. The tricky waters of the Mississippi ever threatened to fling the gunboat hard aground in hostile territory; and Confederate cannon and riflemen lay hidden ashore waiting to harass' the Union ships and their men.

=== Gulf of Mexico ===
On 9 August Kennebec headed for the open sea for blockade and cruising duty in the Gulf of Mexico. From time she exchanged fire with shore batteries and shelled targets ashore. She helped capture schooner Jupiter 4 May 1863 and took schooner Hunter on the 17th. Steamer William Bayley fell prey to her 18 July. She shared in the capture of schooner Winona off Mobile, Alabama 29 November and she took schooner Marshall J. Smith laden with 260 bales of cotton 9 December. On the last day of 1863, she made a prize of steamer Grey Jacket after the blockade runner had slipped out of Mobile laden with cotton, rosin, and turpentine for Havana. She then took schooner John Scott after an 8-hour chase 7 January 1864.

The conquest of Mobile was Farragut's next major objective. Kennebec helped blockade the port during the spring and summer of 1864. On 30 June Glasgow had forced blockade-running steamer Ivanhoe to run aground near Fort Morgan 30 June. Because the steamer was protected by the fort's guns, Rear Admiral Farragut attempted at first to destroy her by long range fire from Metacomet and Monongahela. When this proved unsuccessful, Farragut authorized his Flag Lieutenant, J. Crittenden Watson, to lead a boat expedition to burn Ivanhoe. Under the cover of darkness and the ready guns on board Metacomet and Kennebec, Watson led four boats directly to the grounded steamer and fired her in two places shortly after midnight 6 July. Farragut wrote: "The admiral commanding has much pleasure in announcing to the fleet, what was anxiously looked for last night by hundreds, the destruction of the blockade runner ashore under the rebel batteries by an expedition of boats... the entire conduct of the expedition was marked by a promptness and energy which shows what may be expected of such officers and men on similar occasions."

On the morning of 5 August Admiral Farragut was ready to attack Mobile. Kennebec was lashed alongside Monongahela when the Union ships got underway shortly after 6 A.M. An hour later the guns at Fort Morgan opened fire and Confederate steamers Morgan and Games soon joined them. Undaunted Farragut's ships steamed steadily ahead and answered as they came within range. After an hour of fighting, the South's ironclad ram Tennessee passed across Monongahela's bow and struck Kennebec's bow; glanced off; and fired into the gunboat's berth deck as she pulled away, wounding four members of Kennebec's crew but doing little damage to the ship. Kennebec then cast off from Monongahela and steamed up the bay. By mid-morning all major Confederate opposition afloat had been destroyed or captured; and the rest of the day was spent rounding up Southern merchant ships. Kennebec chased several and captured schooner Corina.

On 8 August Fort Gaines surrendered; and Kennebec turned her attention to shelling Fort Morgan until that valiantly-defended southern stronghold surrendered on the 23d. After repairs at Pensacola, Florida, Kennebec sailed for the Texas coast 10 March 1865 and remained on blockade there until the Confederacy collapsed. Off Galveston, Texas she engaged in one of the last actions of the war. On 24 May blockade runner Denbigh, once described by Admiral Farragut as "too quick for us," was found aground at daylight on Bird Key Spit, near Galveston. She had attempted to run into the Texas port once again under cover of darkness. She was destroyed during the day by gunfire from Cornubia and Princess Royal, and later boarding parties from Kennebec and Seminole set her aflame. Prior to the capture of Mobile Bay, Denbigh had plagued Farragut by running regularly from Mobile to Havana.

=== Post war ===
After the war ended, Kennebec remained off the Texas coast providing stability as Union authority was restored and keeping an eye on events in Mexico, where French intervention had violated the Monroe Doctrine. She headed eastward 6 July, stopped at Pensacola a week, and reached Hampton Roads on the 23rd. Five days later she sailed North and reached Boston 1 August.

Kennebec decommissioned at Boston Navy Yard 9 August 1865 and was sold at New York 30 November 1865.
