= USS Sagamore (1861) =

Gunboat of the United States Navy

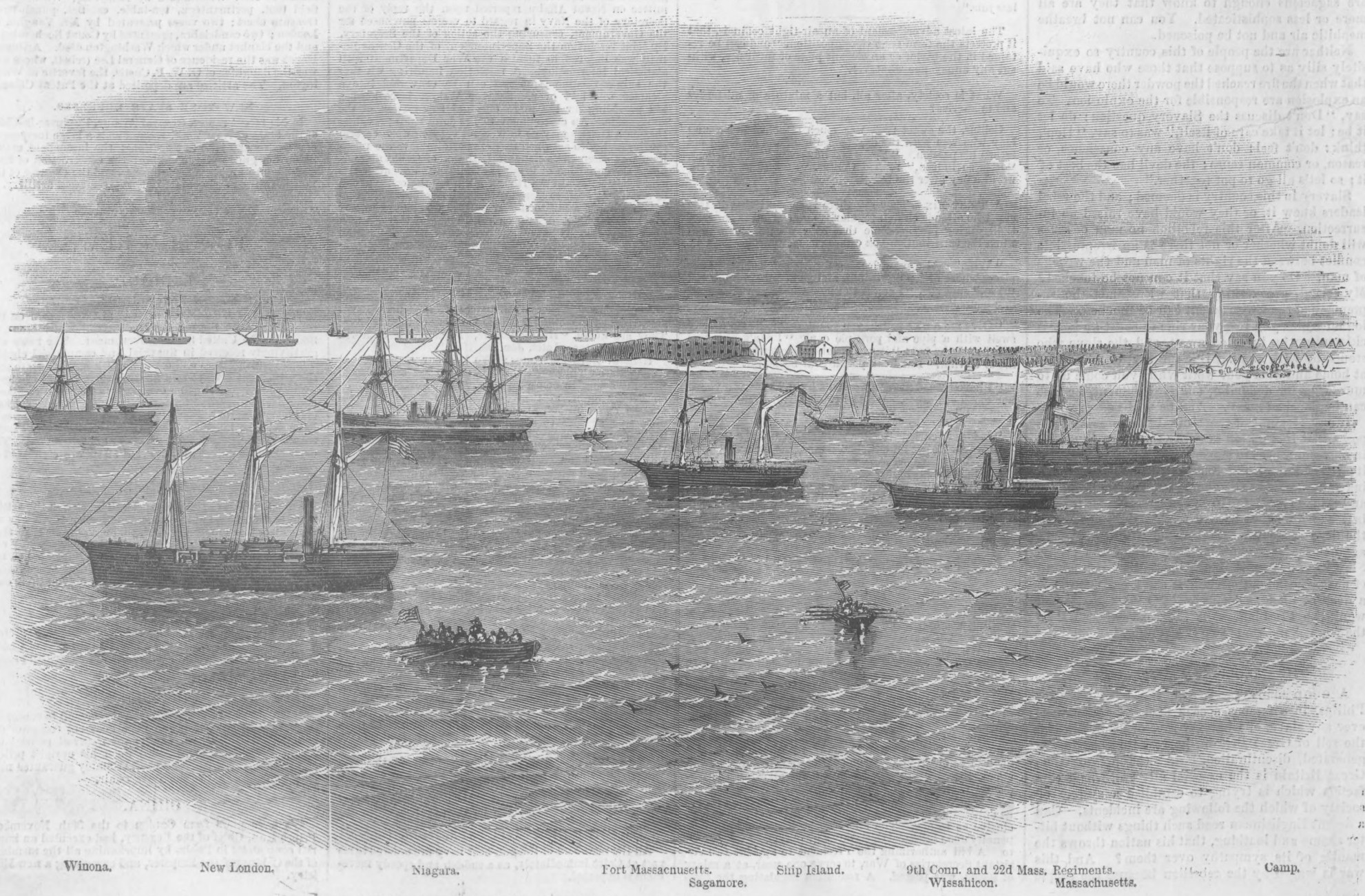
- USS Sagamore (3rd ship from the right) at Ship Island base,

History

United States
- Name: USS Sagamore
- Builder: Reaney, Son & Archbold
- Laid down: date unknown
- Launched: 1 September 1861 at Boston, Massachusetts
- Commissioned: 7 December 1861 at the Boston Navy Yard
- Decommissioned: 1 December 1864 at Philadelphia, Pennsylvania
- Stricken: 1865 (est.)
- Fate: Sold, 13 June 1865

Empire of Japan
- Acquired: 1865
- In service: 1868
- Renamed: Yōshun (陽春)
- Fate: Sold, 1870

General characteristics
- Class & type: Unadilla-class gunboat
- Displacement: 691 tons
- Tons burthen: 507
- Length: 158 ft (48 m) (waterline)
- Beam: 28 ft (8.5 m)
- Draft: 9 ft 6 in (2.90 m) (max.)
- Depth of hold: 12 ft (3.7 m)
- Propulsion: 2 × 200 IHP 30-in bore by 18 in stroke horizontal back-acting engines; single screw
- Sail plan: Two-masted schooner
- Speed: 10 kn (11.5 mph)
- Complement: 114
- Armament: Original: 1 × 11-in Dahlgren smoothbore; 2 × 24-pdr smoothbore; 2 × 20-pdr Parrott rifle

USS Sagamore was a Unadilla-class gunboat built on behalf of the United States Navy for service during the American Civil War. She was outfitted as a gunboat and assigned to the Union blockade of the Confederate States of America. Sagamore was very active during the war, and served the Union both as a patrol ship and a bombardment vessel.

== Under United States Navy service ==
=== Commissioned in 1861 at the Boston Navy Yard ===
The first U.S. Navy ship to be so named, USS Sagamore — a wooden-hulled, screw-driven gunboat built by the A. & G. T. Sampson and Atlantic Works Boston, Massachusetts — was launched on 1 September 1861 and commissioned on 7 December 1861 at the Boston Navy Yard.

=== Civil War ===
==== Assigned to the East Gulf blockade ====
On 26 November 1861, Sagamore received orders to report to Flag Officer William McKean for duty as part of the East Gulf Blockading Squadron which patrolled the waters off the coasts of Florida, Alabama, and Mississippi.

Sagamore's first encounter with the enemy came at Apalachicola, Florida. On 3 April 1862, armed boat crews from Sagamore and USS Mercedita captured the city without resistance.

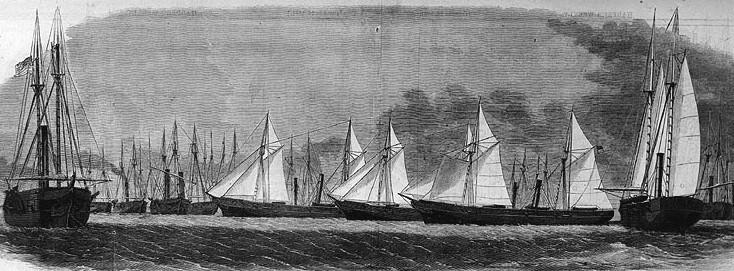
Sagamore is the ship at extreme right.

On 30 June 1862, Sagamore attacked Tampa, Florida, but withdrew after exchanging fire with a Confederate shore battery.

On 11 September, a landing party from Sagamore destroyed the salt works, which could produce 200 bushels a day, at St. Andrews Bay, Florida.

Sagamore next captured the blockade-running English schooner By George off Indian River, Florida on 1 December, with a cargo of coffee and sugar.

In January 1863, Sagamore captured Avenger, Julia, and destroyed the sloop Elizabeth. Next she captured the sloop Enterprise on 8 March 1863, and the sloop New York on 26 April.

==== Shelling New Smyrna, Florida ====
On 28 July, boats from Sagamore and USS Para attacked New Smyrna, Florida. After shelling the town, Union forces captured two schooners; caused the Confederate forces to destroy several other vessels, some of which were loaded with cotton and ready to sail; and burned large quantities of cotton on shore.

Following the attack at New Smyrna, Sagamore returned to her coastal duties. On 8 August, Sagamore captured the sloops Clara Louise, Southern Rights, Shot, and Ann.

==== Suwannee River operations ====
On 21 April 1864, boat expeditions from Sagamore took 100 bales of cotton and destroyed 300 additional bales near Clay Landing on the Suwannee River, Florida.

Sagamore's final action in the Civil War took place on 7 June. Suspecting that Confederate forces were using cotton to erect breastworks on the banks of the Suwannee River, a boat expedition composed of men from Sagamore and USS Clyde proceeded up the river and captured over 100 bales of cotton in the vicinity of Clay Landing.

=== Decommissioning ===
Sagamore was decommissioned on 1 December 1864 at Philadelphia, Pennsylvania, and was sold at New York City. on 13 June 1865.

== Under Japanese service ==
Sagamore was acquired by Kubota Domain, one of the feudal domains of the Tokugawa shogunate of Japan in 1865 as the Saga-no-kami, and was renamed Yōshun-maru in 1868. She was donated to the nascent Imperial Japanese Navy during the Boshin War of the Meiji restoration. Yoshun is recorded to have departed Uraga on 24 April 1869 for Miyako Bay, where she came under attack from the Republic of Ezo Navy gunboat Kaiten at the Battle of Miyako Bay on 27 April. She departed Miyako Bay on 6 May with a continent of soldiers and equipment, which she delivered to Aomori on 8 May. She then transported troops and equipment from Aomori to Hakodate on 19 May and was a participant at the Naval Battle of Hakodate Bay, remaining in those waters until the surrender of the last forces of the Republic of Ezo. In 1870, she was demilitarized and sold to a civilian shipping firm operating scheduled services between Osaka and Tokyo. However, later the same year, she was purchased by an American shipping firm for routes throughout the far east, and was renamed Daimyo. Her subsequent fate is not known.
