= USS Tahoma =

Gunboat of the United States Navy

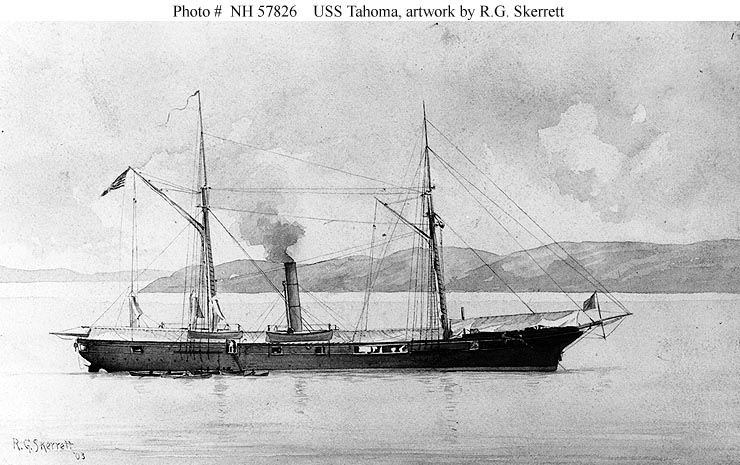

History

United States
- Name: USS Tahoma
- Laid down: 1861
- Launched: 2 October 1861
- Commissioned: 20 December 1861
- Decommissioned: 23 July 1864
- In service: 13 April 1865
- Out of service: 27 August 1867
- Stricken: 1867 (est.)
- Fate: Sold, 7 October 1867

General characteristics
- Class & type: Unadilla-class gunboat
- Displacement: 691 tons
- Tons burthen: 507
- Length: 158 ft (48 m) (waterline)
- Beam: 28 ft (8.5 m)
- Draft: 9 ft 6 in (2.90 m) (max.)
- Depth of hold: 12 ft (3.7 m)
- Propulsion: 2 × 200 IHP 30-in bore by 18 in stroke horizontal back-acting engines; single screw
- Sail plan: Two-masted schooner
- Speed: 10 kn (11.5 mph)
- Complement: 114
- Armament: Original: 1 × 11-in Dahlgren smoothbore; 2 × 24-pdr smoothbore; 2 × 20-pdr Parrott rifle

USS Tahoma was a Unadilla-class gunboat built by order of the United States Navy for service during the American Civil War.

Tahoma was used by the Union Navy as a gunboat in support of the Union Navy blockade of Confederate waterways.

== Commissioned at the Philadelphia Navy Yard ==
Tahoma—a wooden-hulled, 4th rate screw gunboat constructed during 1861 at Wilmington, Delaware, by W. and A. Thatcher—was launched on 2 October 1861; and commissioned at the Philadelphia Navy Yard on 20 December 1861, Lieutenant John C. Howell in command.

== Civil War operations ==
=== 1862 ===
The Tahoma was assigned to the East Gulf Blockading Squadron and remained there until the end of the war. On 26 April 1862, while patrolling east of Sea Horse Key, Florida, the screw gunboat chased a schooner until the quarry ran aground where she was destroyed. Two months later, Tahoma raided St. Marks, Florida, burned a barracks and destroyed a battery of cannon before heading out to sea, unscathed.

While patrolling off the Yucatan Peninsula on 7 July, Tahoma captured the blockade-running schooner Uncle Mose, which had sailed unawares up to where the gunboat had anchored. Comdr. Howell later reported that the Confederate captain was astonished "at finding a man-of-war where we were anchored." The prize was laden with 115 bales of badly needed cotton.

After patrol duty in the late summer and early fall, Tahoma helped to destroy three important Confederate salt works. On the morning of 6 October, Tahoma, and Somerset lay to off Sea Horse Key and sent ashore a landing party of 111 men in eight boats. A pre-landing bombardment of shell, shrapnel, and canister fired from the howitzers mounted in two of the boats scattered some 20 to 30 armed Confederate guerrillas.

The sailors quickly landed and deployed to cover the boats. Working parties destroyed 28 boilers and burned all buildings in the vicinity. As Howell subsequently reported:

the expedition was entirely successful ... no confusion was exhibited on landing ... no useless expenditure of ammunition, and no one hurt.

=== 1863 ===
While operating along the Florida coast during the first six months of 1863, Tahoma captured seven blockade runners: the cotton-laden sloop Silas Henry at Tampa Bay on 8 January; British schooner Margaret off St. Petersburg, Florida, on 1 February; the yacht Stonewall off Pea Creek(now called the Peace River) on 22 February; schooner Crazy Jane, carrying a cargo of cotton and turpentine, near Gadsden's Point on 5 May; cotton-carrying schooner Statesman in Tampa Bay on 6 June; the British blockade-running schooner Harrietton off Anclote Keys on 18 June; and Mary Jane, destroyed on the same day at Clearwater, Florida.

On 7 July, the ships crew captured an unnamed flatboat loaded with sugar and molasses near the Manatee River.

Also during this period, Tahoma engaged a Confederate shore battery at Gadsden's Point on 2 April.

Tahoma and Adela landed an expeditionary force at Tampa, Florida, on 17 October 1863 and burned the steamer Scottish Chief as well as the sloop Kate Dale. Operating out of Key West, Florida, from January 1864, Tahoma launched two daring raids against Confederate salt works in February of that year.

=== 1864 ===
On the morning of 17 February, a landing force went ashore in two detachments and marched seven miles inland to destroy salt works at St. Marks, Florida.

Ten days later, another force went ashore to destroy an even more distant station near Goose Creek. On the latter occasion, the landing party eluded Confederate cavalry and brought off a dozen prisoners, including a captain from an infantry company. Before their destruction, these two salt works had produced some 2,500 bushels of salt—important not only for preserving food but also for making gunpowder.

=== 1865 and post-War ===
In the summer, the gunboat steamed north for repairs and was placed out of commission at the New York Navy Yard on 23 July 1864.

After the completion of her overhaul, the ship was recommissioned on 13 April 1865 and operated off the U.S. East Coast until decommissioned at Boston, Massachusetts, on 27 July of the same year. The ship again served on active duty, this time with the Gulf Squadron, from the fall of 1866 into the summer of 1867.

== Post-war decommissioning and sale ==
Tahoma was decommissioned for the last time on 27 August 1867. The ship was later sold on 7 October that same year at New York City.

== See also ==
- Union Navy
