= USS Pembina (1861) =

Unadilla-class gunboat of the Union Navy during the American Civil War

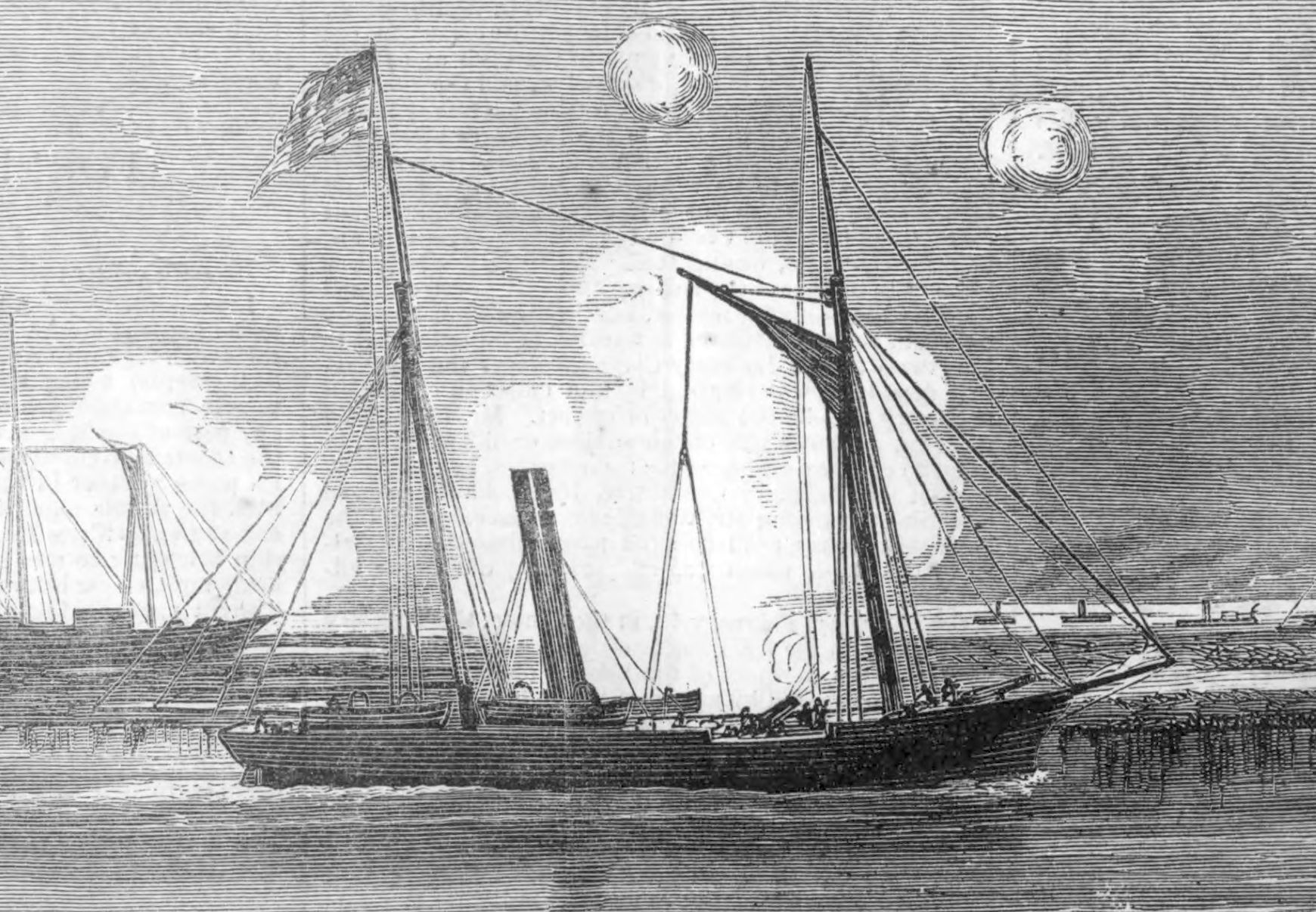
- USS Pembina providing covering fire in the Savannah River, February 1862

History

United States
- Name: Pembina
- Builder: Thomas Stack (Williamsburg, NY)
- Laid down: not known
- Launched: not known
- Commissioned: 16 October 1861
- Decommissioned: 22 September 1865
- Stricken: 1865 (est.)
- Fate: Sold, 30 November 1865

General characteristics
- Class & type: Unadilla-class gunboat
- Displacement: 691 tons
- Tons burthen: 507
- Length: 158 ft (48 m) (waterline)
- Beam: 28 ft (8.5 m)
- Draft: 9 ft 6 in (2.90 m) (max.)
- Depth of hold: 12 ft (3.7 m)
- Propulsion: 2 × 200 IHP 30-in bore by 18 in stroke horizontal back-acting engines; single screw
- Sail plan: Two-masted schooner
- Speed: 10 kn (11.5 mph)
- Complement: 114
- Armament: Original: 1 × 11-in Dahlgren smoothbore; 2 × 24-pdr smoothbore; 2 × 20-pdr Parrott rifle

USS Pembina was a Unadilla-class gunboat built for the Union Navy during the American Civil War. She was used by the Navy to patrol navigable waterways of the Confederacy to prevent the South from trading with other countries.

== Service ==
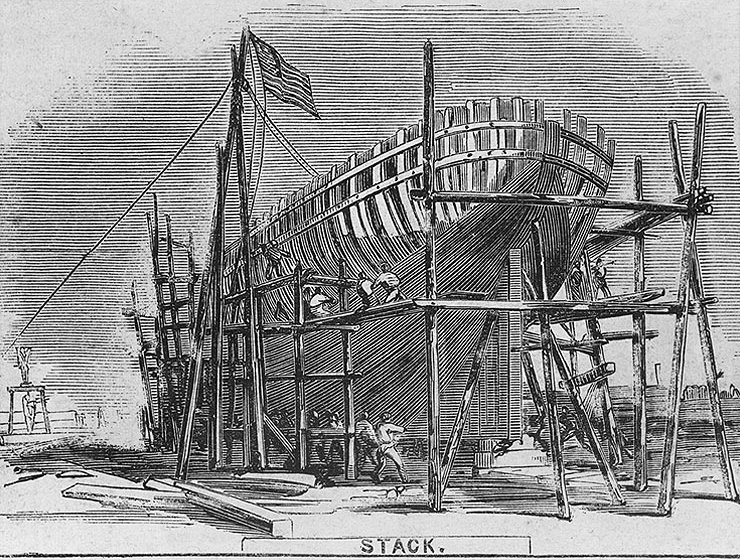
Pembina under construction

Pembina, a screw gunboat built by Thomas Stack and Novelty Iron Works, New York City, was commissioned 16 October 1861.

By 5 November, she had joined the South Atlantic Blockading Squadron and with Ottawa, Seneca, and Pawnee engaged and dispersed a small Confederate squadron in Port Royal Sound, then fired on Fort Beauregard and Fort Walker. Returning with a larger force on 7 November, she fired on Fort Walker until it was abandoned. Then, on 9 November, she covered the occupation of Beaufort, South Carolina.

In early December, she penetrated into Wassaw Sound to assist in closing off Savannah, Georgia. By the end of the month, she had engaged Confederate positions at Port Royal Ferry and into January 1862 assisted in clearing the Coosaw River. Between 17 January and 18 February, she operated in the Wright’s and Mud rivers area, clearing mines from the Savannah River above the mouth of Wright’s River between 13–15 February.

Continuing to cruise off the Georgia and northern Florida coasts she escorted transports and covered troops as they assaulted Confederate positions and, on 9 April, as they evacuated Jacksonville, Florida. In May, she shifted to the Carolina coast for operations in the Stono River, where on 6 June seized her first prize, the schooner Rowena.

Later shifted to the U.S. Gulf Coast, she captured a second vessel, the sloop Elias Beckwith, near Mobile, Alabama, 23 April 1863. Remaining on the Gulf Coast, she seized her third and last blockade runner, the Dutch brig Geziena Hilligonda, carrying medicines, iron and cloth, off Brazos Santiago, Texas, on 4 December 1864.

After the war, she returned to the U.S. East Coast. Decommissioned at the Washington Navy Yard on 22 September 1865, she was sold at New York City on 30 November 1865.
