= Winnegance, Maine =

Coordinates: 43°52′20″N 69°49′09″W

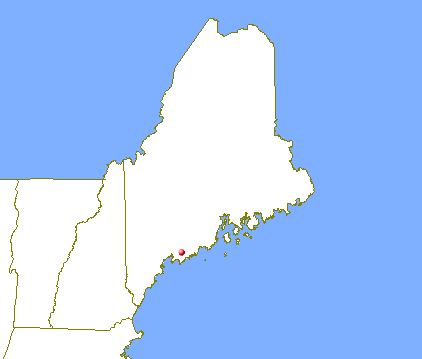
Map showing the location of Winnegance, Maine

Winnegance is an area which includes parts of the towns of West Bath, Phippsburg, and the city of Bath, Maine, United States. It is located in Sagadahoc County, near Winnegance Lake and Winnegance Creek.

Winnegance is from the word Winnegansis, Abenaki for "little portage". Following Winnegance Creek upstream from the Kennebec, then portaging one's canoe a short distance west to Winnegance Bay on the New Meadows River allowed the traveler to avoid the rough waters at the mouth of the Kennebec and Small Point. The route now crosses private land.
