= USS Pinola (1861) =

Gunboat of the United States Navy

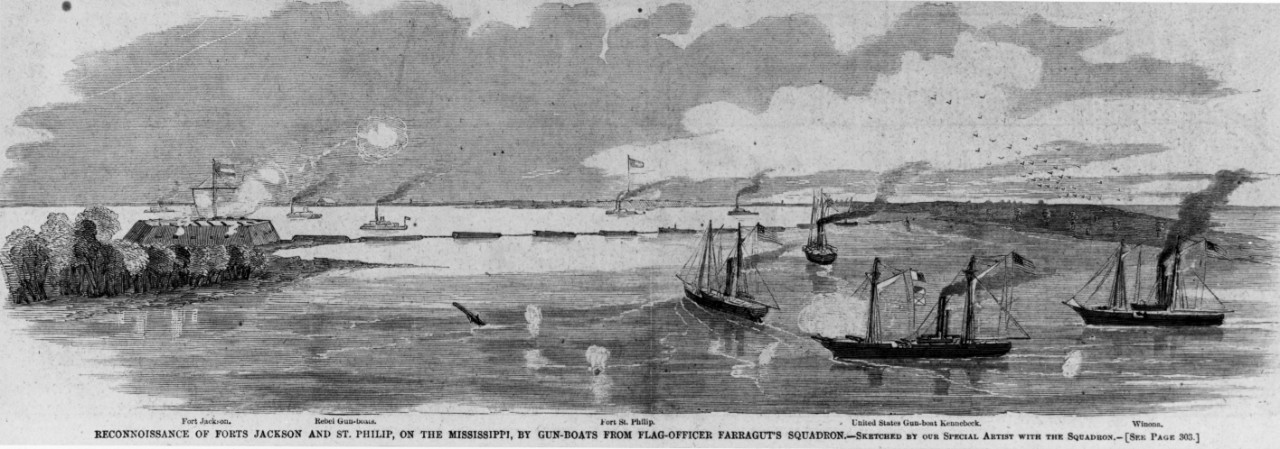
- The Pinola (directly above the Kennebec) at Fort Jackson

History

United States
- Name: USS Pinola
- Builder: J. J. Abrahams (Baltimore, MD)
- Launched: 3 Oct 1861
- Commissioned: 29 January 1862
- Decommissioned: 15 July 1865
- Fate: Sold 30 November 1865, converted to a sailing merchant bark

General characteristics
- Class & type: Unadilla-class gunboat
- Displacement: 691 tons
- Tons burthen: 507
- Length: 158 ft (48 m) (waterline)
- Beam: 28 ft (8.5 m)
- Draft: 9 ft 6 in (2.90 m) (max.)
- Depth of hold: 12 ft (3.7 m)
- Propulsion: 2 × 200 IHP 30-in bore by 18 in stroke horizontal back-acting engines; single screw
- Sail plan: Two-masted schooner
- Speed: 10 kn (11.5 mph)
- Complement: 114
- Armament: Original: 1 × 11-in Dahlgren smoothbore; 2 × 24-pdr smoothbore; 2 × 20-pdr Parrott rifle

USS Pinola was a Unadilla-class gunboat built for the Union Navy during the American Civil War.

== Service history ==
The Pinola was launched on or about 3 October 1861, commissioned on 29 January 1862 under the command of Lieutenant Peirce Crosby and soon left for the Gulf of Mexico, her station for more than three years of Civil War service.

In April 1862, Pinola played an active role in the campaign that led to the capture of New Orleans and was damaged while running past the fortifications below that city during the Battle of Forts Jackson and St. Philip. One of her sailors, Gunner's Mate John B. Frisbee, was awarded the Medal of Honor for his actions during the battle. In months that followed, she was employed on the lower Mississippi. On 28 June 1862, Pinola was one of the ships that successfully steamed past the batteries at Vicksburg, and passed them again headed down stream on 15 July.

During 1863-64, Pinola served on the blockade off Mobile Bay, Alabama. She was similarly engaged off the coast of Texas during the last months of the war. During her years in the Gulf, Pinola captured two blockade runners and destroyed a third. Decommissioned in July 1865, Pinola was sold the following November. She was subsequently converted to a sailing merchant bark.

== See also ==
- Union Blockade
