= USS Chocura =

Gunboat of the United States Navy

History

United States
- Name: USS Chocura
- Builder: Curtis and Tilden, Boston, Massachusetts
- Launched: 5 October 1861
- Commissioned: 15 February 1862
- Decommissioned: 7 June 1867
- Fate: Sold, 13 July 1867

General characteristics
- Class & type: Unadilla-class gunboat
- Displacement: 691 tons
- Tons burthen: 507
- Length: 158 ft (48 m) (waterline)
- Beam: 28 ft (8.5 m)
- Draft: 9 ft 6 in (2.90 m) (max.)
- Depth of hold: 12 ft (3.7 m)
- Propulsion: 2 × 200 IHP 30-in bore by 18 in stroke horizontal back-acting engines; single screw
- Sail plan: Two-masted schooner
- Speed: 10 kn (11.5 mph)
- Complement: 114
- Armament: Original: 1 × 11-in Dahlgren smoothbore; 2 × 24-pdr smoothbore; 2 × 20-pdr Parrott rifle

The first USS Chocura was a Unadilla-class gunboat which saw service with the U.S. Navy during the American Civil War.

Chocura was launched 5 October 1861 by Curtis and Tilden, Boston, Massachusetts, and commissioned 15 February 1862, Commander T. H. Patterson in command.

== Service history ==
Departing Boston 17 March 1862 Chocura was forced to put into Baltimore, Maryland for repairs and did not arrive at Fort Monroe, Virginia, until 6 April. She was then assigned the blockade of Yorktown and patrol up the York River until 9 November 1862 when she joined the North Atlantic Blockading Squadron for service off Wilmington, North Carolina. Cruising there until 15 August 1863, she captured two prizes, and assisted Maratanza in taking another.

After repairs at the Philadelphia Navy Yard, Chocura sailed to New Orleans, Louisiana, arriving 30 November 1863. Here she joined the West Gulf Blockading Squadron for patrols in the Gulf of Mexico, taking six prizes and assisting in capturing two others, and cutting out and destroying a three-masted schooner late in January 1865.

After the war and repairs at Pensacola Navy Yard, Chocura resumed her cruising in the Gulf of Mexico as a part of the newly activated Gulf Squadron 17 October 1866.

She arrived at New York 30 May 1867, was decommissioned there 7 June 1867, and sold 13 July 1867.
