= USS Antona (1863) =

Gunboat of the United States Navy

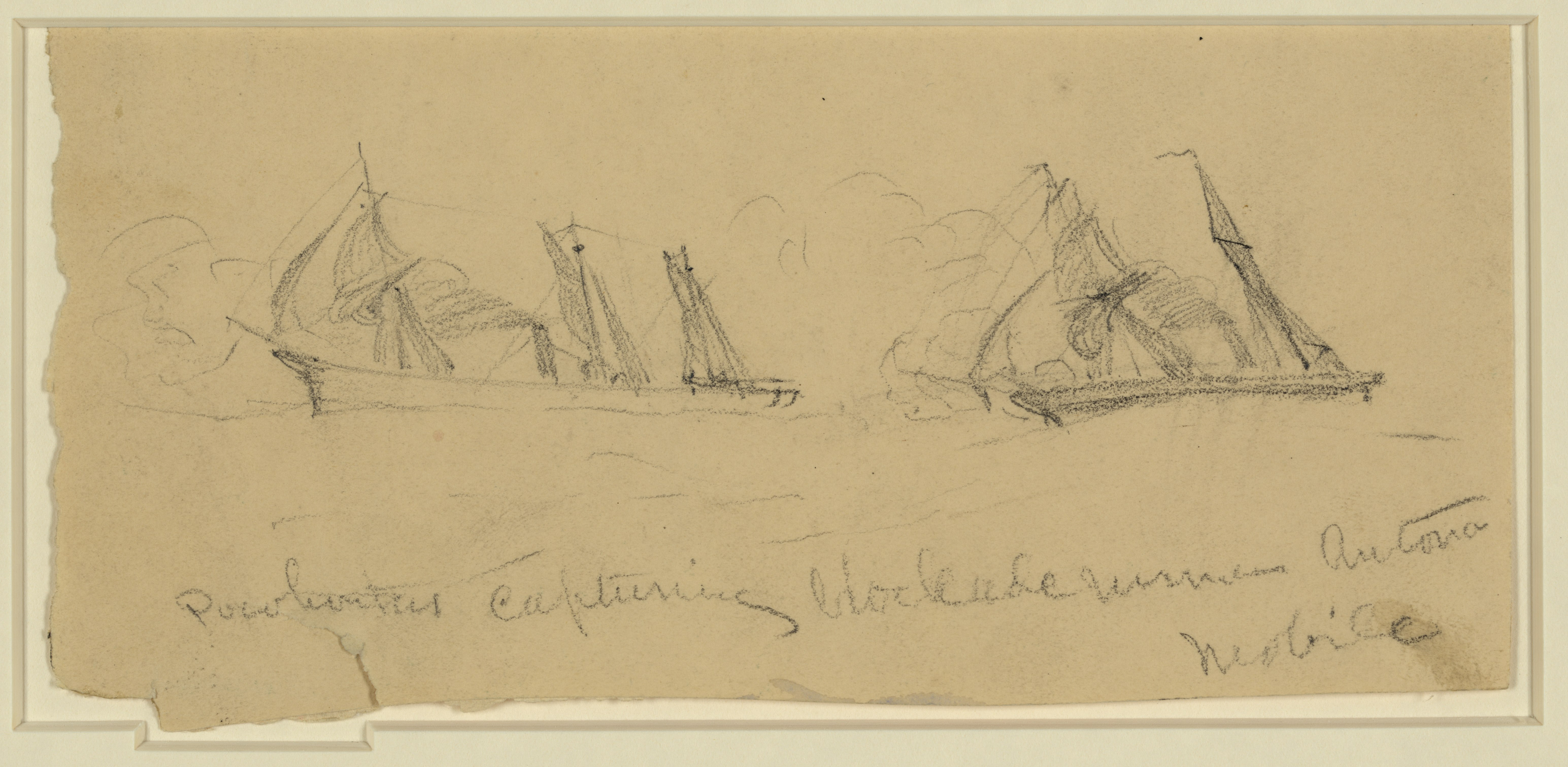
- The USS Pocahontas captures the SS Antona in Mobile, note that it is not called the Antonia blockade runner nor is the Pocahontas the Pocohontus.

History

United States
- Acquired: 28 March 1864
- Commissioned: 19 March 1863
- Decommissioned: 12 August 1865
- Captured: by Union Navy forces; 6 January 1863
- Fate: Sold, 30 November 1865

General characteristics
- Displacement: 549 tons
- Draft: 13 ft (4.0 m)
- Propulsion: steam engine; screw-propelled
- Speed: 8 knots (15 km/h; 9.2 mph)
- Complement: 56
- Armament: two 32-pounder guns; one 20-pounder Parrott rifle; two 24-pounder smoothbore guns

USS Antona was a steamer captured by the Union Navy during the American Civil War. She was used by the Union Navy as a dispatch boat and gunboat in support of the Union Navy blockade of the Confederate States of America.

== Service history ==
=== As a blockade runner ===
On the morning of 6 January 1863, the Union screw steamer Pocahontas sighted a ship in the Gulf of Mexico, steaming westward close to the Alabama shore and headed toward the entrance to Mobile Bay. Soon after the blockader had turned to intercept the stranger lest she reach the protection of the Southern guns at Fort Morgan—then some nine miles away—the unidentified steamer altered her own course in an effort to escape. Both vessels pushed their engines to their limits and broke out all possible sails. Pocahontas slowly gained on her quarry but the sun was close to the horizon before she was near enough to fire a shot at the fleeing ship. The round fell short of its target which then hoisted English colors as she continued her flight.

About an hour before midnight, the Union ship had closed to about half a mile and fired two more rounds in quick succession which promptly brought the vessel to a stop, about 30 miles south southeast of Cape San Blas, Florida. She proved to be Antona, an iron-hulled British screw steamer built at Glasgow, Scotland. She had departed Liverpool and had proceeded via St. Thomas, Virgin Islands, to Havana, Cuba. There, she took on a contraband cargo of gunpowder, rifles, tea, and brandy before sailing for Mobile, Alabama, on New Year's Day 1863.

After accompanying Pocahontas back to the blockading fleet off Mobile, Antona—manned by a prize crew—sailed for Philadelphia for adjudication. However, while still in the Gulf of Mexico, she sprang a leak which forced her to turn back. While she was undergoing repairs at New Orleans, she was rammed by passing vessels on two separate occasions. These collisions worsened her already leaky condition, caused other significant damage, and necessitated extensive repairs before she could once more put to sea.

=== Union Navy service ===
When this work had been completed, Antona was placed in commission on 19 March 1863, but litigation against her for violation of the blockade was not concluded for another year. Then, having been condemned, in absentia, by the New York City prize court, she was finally purchased by the Union Navy on 28 March 1864. Upon commissioning, the steamer began operations on the lower Mississippi River as a dispatch vessel, working primarily between New Orleans and Port Hudson, Louisiana. This duty was extremely important at this time because Rear Admiral David Farragut in Hartford had dashed upstream past the Confederate batteries at Port Hudson, Louisiana, and was patrolling the river between that Southern stronghold and Vicksburg, Mississippi, to support Rear Admiral David Dixon Porter's joint operations with Major General Ulysses S. Grant's troops in the first effort to open the complete Mississippi River to Union shipping. The surrender of Vicksburg on Independence Day 1863 and the occupation of Port Hudson five days later completed this task and freed Antona for other duty.

Late on the evening of 13 July, Antona—commanded by Acting Master Charles T. Chase—departed New Orleans and headed downstream. However, shortly before 4 o'clock the following morning, she collided with Sciota, sinking that screw gunboat in 12 feet of water about eight miles upriver from Quarantine, Louisiana. Since Antona was unharmed, she was able to resume her voyage on the 15th and, upon reentering the gulf, proceeded in a generally southwesterly direction. On the 16th, she captured Cecelia D. and sent that English schooner to New Orleans under a prize crew. Upon her arrival at Galveston, Texas, on the 18th, Chase reported to Commodore Henry H. Bell, who commanded Union blockading forces in the region. Two days later, Bell ordered Antona to patrol the coast between Velasco, Texas, and the mouth of the Rio Grande. The steamer reached the latter on the morning of the 24th, and Chase immediately went ashore to mail dispatches for the United States consul at Matamoras, Mexico.

While the Union officer was returning to his ship in the Mexican boat Margarita, a band of armed men on the Texas shore threatened to open fire on that craft if it did not head for the bank. When Margarita reached Texas soil, the men—who proved to be Southern soldiers—arrested Chase and sent him to Brownsville, Texas. Acting Master Spiro V. Bennis, Antona's executive officer learned of Chase's misfortune from a passing English ship and remained in the vicinity until he had verified the report. Antona then headed up the coast and arrived off Galveston on 27 July. The steamer remained in that vicinity until getting underway again on 4 August and heading back down the coast. On the 6th, Antona—then under command of Acting Master Lyman Wells—captured Betsy some 16 miles southeast of Corpus Christi, Texas, flying English colors and purportedly from Matamoras to New Orleans with a general cargo.

Wells sent that schooner to New Orleans under a prize crew for adjudication. Antona arrived off the mouth of the Rio Grande on the 8th and reembarked Chase who had been released by Brigadier General Hamilton P. Bee, CSA—who commanded Confederate troops in Texas—because of his having been captured in neutral waters. She sailed for Galveston two days later and reached the blockade station off that port on the 12th suffering from damage to her boilers, machinery, and propeller. Towed to New Orleans by Bermuda, she remained there under repair until heading downriver on 16 November to return to the coast of Texas. On the 29th, her new commanding officer, Acting Master Alfred L. B. Zerega reported having captured Mary Ann three days before. That Southern schooner of Sabine, Texas, had departed Caleasieu Pass on the 21st and was heading for Tampico, Mexico, with a cargo of cotton. Since the prize was leaking badly, Zerega transferred her cotton to Bermuda for delivery to the Federal prize commissioners at New Orleans and then destroyed the schooner before resuming Antona's voyage southward.

Antona scored again on Christmas Eve 1863 when she took the British schooner Exchange 10 miles east of Velasco. This ship had departed Veracruz, Mexico, with a widely varied general cargo including a large quantity of liquor and was purportedly heading for New Orleans. Since she was far off course for that port, Zerega. seized the schooner, removed her liquor since he "...did not deem it safe to allow it to go in the schooner to New Orleans. "After promising to... send it on for adjudication...by...the first safe opportunity," Zerega sent the prize to New Orleans and resumed Antona's patrol. The steamer's operations through the remainder of the Civil War were similar to her earlier services. Her last notable action occurred before dawn on 10 February 1865 when a boat from the steamer joined an expedition led by Lt. Charles E. McKay of Princess Royal to destroy the large iron-hulled steamer Will O'The Wisp which had run aground off Galveston.

After the end of the war Antona departed Pensacola, Florida, on 27 July 1865 and proceeded North. She was decommissioned at New York City on 12 August 1865 and sold at auction there to G. W. Quintard on 30 November 1865. Redocumented Carlotta on 5 January 1867, the steamer served as a merchantman operating out of New York until destroyed by fire in 1874.
