= USS Shamokin =

Mohongo-class gunboat

History

United States
- Name: USS Shamokin
- Namesake: The largest 18th-century Indian settlement in Pennsylvania
- Builder: Reaney, Son & Archbold
- Yard number: 34
- Acquired: 31 July 1865
- Commissioned: 17 October 1865
- Decommissioned: 24 December 1868
- In service: 31 July 1865
- Out of service: 24 December 1868
- Renamed: Georgia
- Fate: Sold 21 October 1869, wrecked off Costa Rica, 30 September 1878

General characteristics
- Type: Double-ended gunboat
- Tonnage: 1,030 long tons (1,047 t)
- Length: 255 ft (78 m)
- Beam: 35 ft (11 m)
- Draft: 12 ft (3.7 m)

The first USS Shamokin was a double-ended gunboat built during the American Civil War at Chester, Pennsylvania by Reaney, Son & Archbold.

== Service history ==
=== Naval service ===
Shamokin was delivered to the Navy at the Philadelphia Navy Yard on 31 July 1865, and commissioned there on 17 October 1865, Comdr. Pierce Crosby in command.

Completed too late for service in the Civil War, Shamokin proceeded via New York City to the coast of Brazil. After three years of service in the South Atlantic Squadron, protecting American citizens and interests along the coast of South America, Shamokin returned home and was decommissioned and laid up at the Washington Navy Yard on 24 December 1868. She was sold there on 21 October 1869 to a Mr. T. Clyde.

=== Commercial service ===
After an extensive rebuild for commercial service, Shamokin was renamed Georgia. Georgia operated for nearly a decade before being wrecked off Costa Rica on 30 September 1878.
