= USS Winona =

Gunboat of the United States Navy

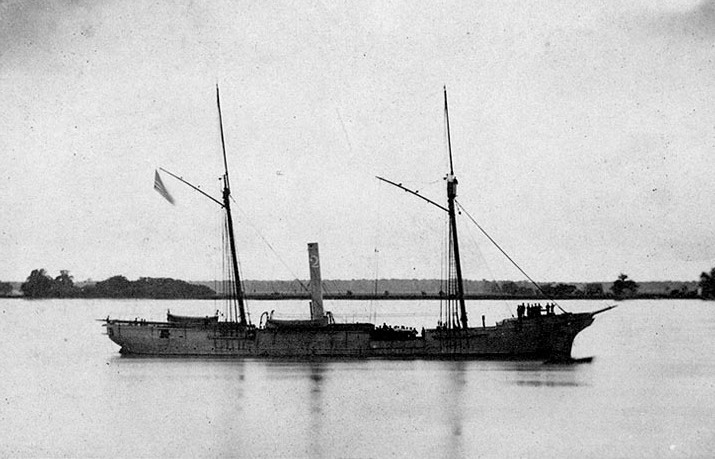
- USS Winona in the Mississippi River off Baton Rouge, Louisiana, in March 1863.

History

United States
- Name: USS Winona
- Namesake: The chief village of the Kiyuksa band of the Mdewakanton Sioux.
- Builder: C. & R. Poillon, New York City
- Cost: $101,000 exclusive of armament
- Laid down: date unknown
- Launched: 14 September 1861
- Completed: 1861 at New York City
- Acquired: by the Navy at the New York Navy Yard on 26 November 1861
- Recommissioned: 11 December 1861
- Decommissioned: 9 June 1865
- Stricken: 1865 (est.)
- Fate: Sold at New York City on 30 November 1865

General characteristics
- Class & type: Unadilla-class gunboat
- Displacement: 691 tons
- Tons burthen: 507
- Length: 158 ft (48 m) (waterline)
- Beam: 28 ft (8.5 m)
- Draft: 9 ft 6 in (2.90 m) (max.)
- Depth of hold: 12 ft (3.7 m)
- Propulsion: 2 × 200 IHP 30-in bore by 18 in stroke horizontal back-acting engines; single screw
- Sail plan: Two-masted schooner
- Speed: 10 kn (11.5 mph)
- Complement: 114
- Armament: Original: 1 × 11-in Dahlgren smoothbore; 2 × 24-pdr smoothbore; 2 × 20-pdr Parrott rifle

USS Winona was a Unadilla-class gunboat built for service with the Union Navy during the American Civil War. Winona was heavily armed, with large guns for duels at sea, and 24-pounder howitzers for shore bombardment. Winona saw significant action in the Gulf of Mexico and in the waterways of the Mississippi River and was fortunate to return home safely after the war for decommissioning.

== Construction and launch ==
Winona was the first ship to be so named by the U.S. Navy. She was a propeller-driven gunboat constructed in 1861 at the Brooklyn, New York shipyard of C. & R. Poillon. She was launched into the East River on 14 September 1861. The US Government allowed for 75 days of construction, but the shipyard finished its work 46 days after the contract was signed. Winona was delivered to the Navy at the New York Navy Yard on 26 November 1861 and commissioned on 11 December 1861, Lt. Comdr. Edward T. Nichols in command.

Her sea trial under Commander Nichols was satisfactory in terms of the ship, but less so as to the navigation of the ship. On her return from sea, she rammed and sank a launch leaving the Navy yard. She was loaded with bomb shells worth $30,000. Winona also hit a coal barge without apparent damage to either vessel.

Winona's hull was wooden, built from white and live oak, yellow pine, and locust. She was rigged as a two-masted schooner and could sail, but her primary propulsion was provided by a single propeller 9 feet (2.7 m) in diameter. This was powered by two coal-fired steam engines, each with a 30 inches (0.76 m) bore and an 18 inches (0.46 m) stroke. Steam was provided by two boilers which consumed 9 tons of fuel per day. Winona's machinery was built by the Allaire Iron Works.

Winona's original cost, exclusive of armament, was $101,000.

== Civil War service ==
=== Assigned to the Gulf coast ===
Ordered to the Gulf Blockading Squadron and allocated to the West Gulf Blockading Squadron when Union naval responsibility in the area was divided early the next year, she served at the mouth of and in the Mississippi River for the next seven months.

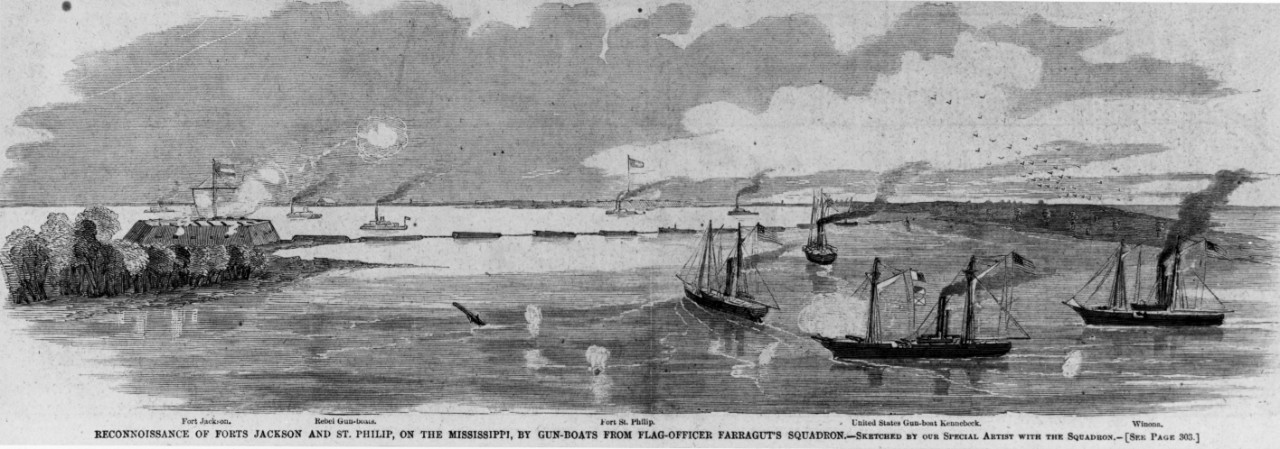
Reconnaissance of Forts Jackson and St. Philip, on the Mississippi, by gun-boats including Winona from Farragut's Squadron

On 24 April 1862, she attempted to pass Forts Jackson and St. Philip but snagged herself on obstructions while the rest of her unit fought its way past the Confederate forts on the river banks and the South's naval forces. Eventually freeing herself, Winona remained below the forts with Comdr. David D. Porter's mortar flotilla while Flag Officer David Farragut moved on upriver to capture New Orleans, Louisiana.

Four days later, her commanding officer took part in accepting the Confederate capitulation of Fort St. Philip. In May, she moved upstream with the mortar boats to join the investment of the Southern stronghold at Vicksburg, Mississippi.

=== The siege of Vicksburg ===
That siege began in earnest late on the afternoon of 26 June when Farragut's mortar boats began their bombardment. At dawn on the 28th, Winona joined the other ships of Farragut's fleet in steaming past the Vicksburg batteries under a hail of fire to unite with the fleet under Flag Officer Davis which had been fighting its way down the river from its base at Cairo, Illinois.

=== Blocking CSS Arkansas ===
Once above Vicksburg, Winona and her colleagues settled into a more or less routine schedule supporting the first Vicksburg campaign and attempting to blockade the Confederate ironclad, Arkansas, in the Yazoo River. On 15 July, however, the Southern warship bested a three-gunboat expedition sent up the Yazoo River after her, disabling USS Carondelet in the river and chasing USS Queen of the West and USS Tyler back down the river.

Arkansas continued out of the Yazoo and into the Mississippi River to begin a bold dash through the 33-ship Union fleet of which Winona remained a unit. Firing as she went, the Confederate warship hurtled through the startled Northern squadron, briefly engaging Winona as she raced past her. Winona responded briefly, but the Confederate ship passed through the gauntlet safely and moored under the protection of the Vicksburg batteries. Soon thereafter, Winona, undertow of USS Wissahickon, re-passed Vicksburg with the rest of Farragut's force and went back to New Orleans.

=== Blockading Mobile, Alabama ===
By late August, the gunboat had joined the blockade off Mobile, Alabama. On 4 September, she was one of three ships on station off that important Confederate port. During the day, she and the gunboat USS Cayuga scampered back and forth investigating ships sighted.

At about 1705 that afternoon, the lookout on board Oneida spied the third strange vessel of the day. Winona received orders to investigate and steamed off toward the stranger. Disregarding the gunboat's hail, the stranger—a barkentine-rigged steamer bearing the unmistakable lines of a British gunboat and flying the red British ensign—bore on toward Oneida. Winona came about and gave chase.

=== Encountering CSS Florida ===
As the intruder approached, Oneida loosed a warning shot across her bow at about 1800. The unidentified warship did not even slacken speed. Oneida put two more shots across her bow in quick succession and then began firing into the ship itself. At 1805, the stranger hauled down the British colors and raised the Confederate ensign. At that point Winona commenced firing at what later proved to be the Confederate commerce raider Florida.

The chase continued until about 1827 when Florida crossed the bar into Mobile Bay and Winona, USS Oneida, and USS Rachel Seaman gave up pursuit because of a combination of growing darkness, shallow water, and the guns of Fort Morgan. Florida had been severely riddled but Lt. John Newland Maffit had succeeded in his audacious dash through the Union blockade in spite of a skeleton crew laid low for the most part by yellow fever and the fact that he was unable to return fire because his guns lacked sponges, rammers, and other necessary equipment. Later, he would repeat the feat on an outward voyage to become a successful commerce raider excelled only by Semmes and Waddell.

=== Return to Mississippi River duty ===
Winona, meanwhile, resumed her blockade duty off Mobile. That duty lasted until December when she received orders to return to the Mississippi River. On 14 December, while anchored near Profit Island, she was fired upon by a well-concealed Confederate shore battery. Though she returned fire, Winona's proved ineffective because she had insufficient steam to bring her broadside to bear on the target. After suffering under the deadly accurate Southern fire, she was forced to retire from the engagement.

In April 1863, the gunboat provided support for the campaign against Port Hudson, Mississippi, one of the two last Confederate strongholds on the river. On 18 June, when a Confederate Army force occupied Plaquemine in Iberville Parish, Louisiana, Winona drove them out with gunfire and then moved on to the fort at nearby Donaldsonville to warn the Union garrison assigned there about the proximity of a large Southern force. The Confederates did not attack the fort immediately; and, in the meantime, Winona steamed up and down the river just in case.

On two occasions during the following 10 days, she sighted and bombarded relatively large Southern concentrations ashore. When the Confederates finally attacked the fort at Donaldsonville on 28 June, Winona's guns helped to repulse them. At the conclusion of that action, she returned north to participate in the final stages of the siege of Vicksburg, which finally surrendered on 4 July 1863.

=== End-of-war operations ===
On 25 August, the gunboat arrived in Baltimore, Maryland, for extensive repairs. She concluded the yard work in February 1864 and departed Baltimore to join the South Atlantic Blockading Squadron off the coasts of South Carolina and Georgia.

For the remainder of the Civil War, that coastal region constituted her area of operations. Though stationed principally on the Charleston, South Carolina, blockade station, she also operated on the Suwannee River where she captured and destroyed a steamer on 25 March 1864. She also participated in attacks on Forts Rosedon and Beaulieu near Savannah, Georgia.

After the Confederate evacuation and Union occupation of Charleston in February 1865, Winona operated on the Combahee River in Georgia until the end of hostilities in April.

== Post-war decommissioning ==
She was placed out of commission on 9 June 1865 at the Portsmouth, New Hampshire, Navy Yard. Winona was moved to the New York Navy Yard on 22 November 1865. She was one of eleven Navy ships auctioned off at New York City on 30 November 1865. Winona sold for $20,500 to Charles W. Copeland, who promptly put her up for sale again. Copeland had a broad range of steam engineering-oriented business including buying and selling steamships and removing and selling their machinery. It is unclear what he did with Winona.

== See also ==
- Union blockade
