= USS Itasca (1861) =

Gunboat of the United States Navy

History

United States
- Laid down: date unknown
- Launched: 1 October 1861
- Commissioned: 28 November 1861
- Decommissioned: 22 August 1865
- Stricken: 1865 (est.)
- Fate: Sold, 30 November 1865

General characteristics
- Class & type: Unadilla-class gunboat
- Displacement: 691 tons
- Tons burthen: 507
- Length: 158 ft (48 m) (waterline)
- Beam: 28 ft (8.5 m)
- Draft: 9 ft 6 in (2.90 m) (max.)
- Depth of hold: 12 ft (3.7 m)
- Propulsion: 2 × 200 IHP 30-in bore by 18 in stroke horizontal back-acting engines; single screw
- Sail plan: Two-masted schooner
- Speed: 10 kn (11.5 mph)
- Complement: 114
- Armament: Original: 1 × 11-in Dahlgren smoothbore; 2 × 24-pdr smoothbore; 2 × 20-pdr Parrott rifle

USS Itasca was a Unadilla-class gunboat built for the U.S. Navy during the American Civil War. She was used by the Navy to patrol navigable waterways of the Confederacy to prevent the South from trading with other countries.

Itasca was a wooden screw steamer launched by Hillman & Streaker at Philadelphia, Pennsylvania, 1 October 1861; and commissioned there 28 November 1861, Lt. C. H. B. Caldwell in command.

== Assigned to the Gulf Blockading Squadron ==
Assigned to the Gulf Blockading Squadron, Itasca promptly began to establish a distinguished record. She captured schooner Lizzie Weston loaded with cotton bound for Jamaica 19 January 1862. A month later she assisted Brooklyn in capturing Confederate steamer Magnolia loaded with cotton and carrying several secret letters containing valuable intelligence concerning Confederate plans to import arms and to assist side-wheel, blockade runner CSS Tennessee to escape through the blockade.

== Reassigned to the Western Squadron of the Gulf Blockade ==
When the Gulf Blockading Squadron was split 20 January 1862, Itasca was assigned to the Western Squadron under Flag Officer David Farragut, who stationed her briefly at Mobile, Alabama, and then called her to the mouth of the Mississippi River 4 March 1862 for service in the impending operations against New Orleans, Louisiana, and the Mississippi River Valley.

== Itasca takes numerous hits while the fleet takes New Orleans ==
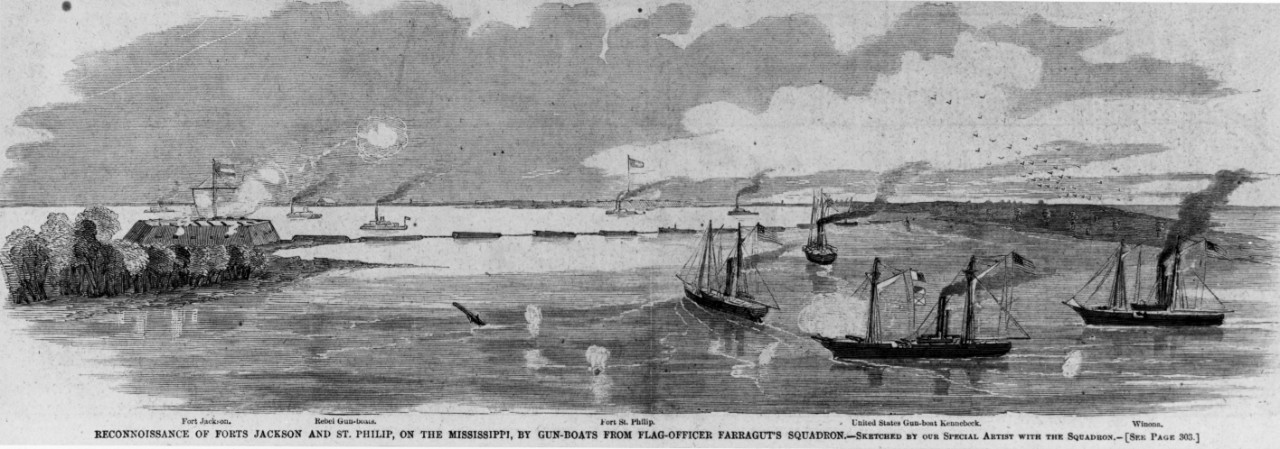
Reconnaissance of Forts Jackson and St. Philip, by gun-boats including Itasca (here, leading Kennebec) from Farragut's Squadron

This formed one prong of the gigantic pincer movement that was destined to cut the Confederacy in two, assuring its defeat. Itasca joined the fleet below Forts St. Philip and Jackson 19 April and promptly added her guns to the bombardment. The next day, accompanied by Kineo and Pinola, she boldly steamed up close to the forts to break the boom which prevented Farragut's ships from sailing up the river to attack New Orleans. Four days later the Union Squadron dashed through the passage to take the South's largest and most highly industrialized city. Itasca, in the dangerous rear of the movement, was caught in "a storm of iron hail ... over and around us from both forts" and disabled by a 42-pound shot which made a large hole in her boiler. Before she could drift down the river out of range, the gallant gunboat received fourteen hits.

== Itasca saves Admiral Farragut from "grave danger" ==
After the fall of New Orleans, Itasca served in the Mississippi River for the remainder of the year successfully fulfilling a wide variety of duties. On one occasion she saved Admiral Farragut from grave danger when Hartford ran hard aground below Vicksburg, Mississippi, 14 May 1862. Itasca, deep in hostile territory, worked hastily, refloating her 3 days later.

Early in 1863, Itasca was ordered to blockade duty off Galveston, Texas, where she arrived 31 January. While in Texas waters, Itasca took two prizes: Miriam, loaded with cotton, 17 June; and Sea Drift, containing a cargo of materiel and drugs, 22 June. On 30 June urgent need for repairs caused her to be dispatched to New Orleans, and she sailed from that port for the North 15 August, arriving Philadelphia for overhaul 26 August.

== Itasca survives the battle of Mobile Bay ==
Itasca departed Philadelphia 26 December and arrived at New Orleans on the last day of 1863. Five days later she was ordered to blockade duty off Mobile Bay, where she was stationed until Admiral Farragut closed the last great gulf port opened to the South 5 August 1864. During historic Battle of Mobile Bay, after dashing past the forts as part of Farragut's formation, Itasca engaged and captured Confederate gunboat Selma.

After returning to the Texas coast, she took English schooner Carrier Mair off Pass Cavallo, Texas, 30 November; and she chased on shore and destroyed sloop Mary Ann.

== Final operations and decommissioning ==
Itasca remained on duty in the Gulf of Mexico until sailing from Pensacola, Florida, for Philadelphia 5 August 1865. She decommissioned 22 August and was sold at New York City 30 November 1865. She was documented as Aurora 23 August 1866 and sold abroad the following year.
