= USS Ottawa (1861) =

Gunboat of the United States Navy

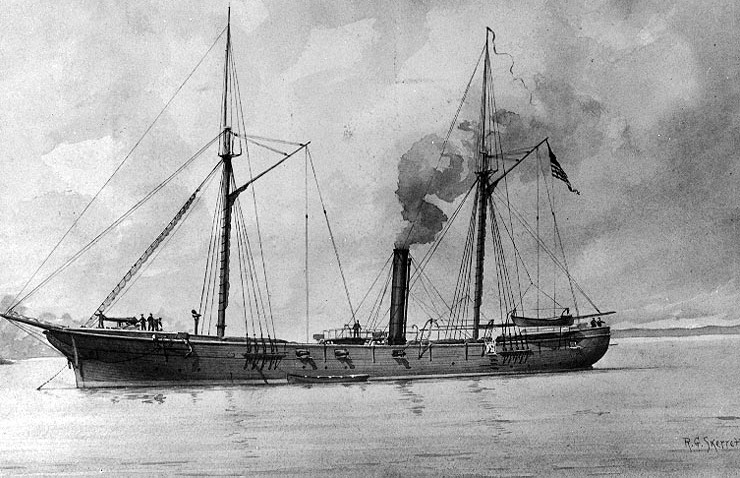
- USS Ottawa (1861)

History

United States
- Name: USS Ottawa
- Builder: J.A. Westervelt, New York City
- Commissioned: 7 October 1861
- Decommissioned: 12 August 1865
- Fate: Sold, 25 October 1865

General characteristics
- Class & type: Unadilla-class gunboat
- Displacement: 691 tons
- Tons burthen: 507
- Length: 158 ft (48 m) (waterline)
- Beam: 28 ft (8.5 m)
- Draft: 9 ft 6 in (2.90 m) (max.)
- Depth of hold: 12 ft (3.7 m)
- Propulsion: 2 × 200 IHP 30-in bore by 18 in stroke horizontal back-acting engines; single screw
- Sail plan: Two-masted schooner
- Speed: 10 kn (11.5 mph)
- Complement: 114
- Armament: Original: 1 × 11-in Dahlgren smoothbore; 2 × 24-pdr smoothbore; 2 × 20-pdr Parrott rifle

USS Ottawa was a Unadilla-class gunboat built for the Union Navy during the American Civil War. Her wooden hull was built by J. A. Westervelt, and her engines by the Novelty Iron Works of New York. She was commissioned at the New York Navy Yard on 7 October 1861.

== Service history ==
Ottawa joined the South Atlantic Blockading Squadron for service in the waters of the Carolinas, Georgia, and Florida. During the Civil War she participated in nineteen operations against ships and shore installations from Hilton Head, South Carolina, to the St. Johns River in Florida.

These included capture of Fort Walker and Fort Beauregard, Port Royal Sound, South Carolina, 7 November; covering the landing of U.S. troops at Wassaw Sound, Georgia, 26 January 1862; capture of Fernandina, Florida, 4 March; attacks on Fort Wagner, Charleston Harbor, South Carolina, from 18 July 1863 to 18 August and on the Confederate batteries on Morris Island from 31 July to 20 August.

Ottawa also assisted the U.S. Army in the occupation of Bull's Bay, South Carolina, 11 February 1865. Other engagements took place with the batteries at Brown's Landing, St. Johns River, Florida, and at Palatka, Florida.

Ottawa returned north and was decommissioned on 12 August 1865 at the New York Navy Yard where she was sold at auction on 25 October for $13,200.
