= USS Penobscot (1861) =

Gunboat of the United States Navy

History

United States
- Name: USS Penobscot
- Laid down: not known
- Launched: 19 November 1861
- Acquired: 16 January 1862
- Commissioned: 1862
- Decommissioned: 31 July 1865
- Stricken: 1869 (est.)
- Fate: Sold, 19 October 1869

General characteristics
- Class & type: Unadilla-class gunboat
- Displacement: 691 tons
- Tons burthen: 507
- Length: 158 ft (48 m) (waterline)
- Beam: 28 ft (8.5 m)
- Draft: 9 ft 6 in (2.90 m) (max.)
- Depth of hold: 12 ft (3.7 m)
- Propulsion: 2 × 200 IHP 30-in bore by 18 in stroke horizontal back-acting engines; single screw
- Sail plan: Two-masted schooner
- Speed: 10 kn (11.5 mph)
- Complement: 114
- Armament: Original: 1 × 11-in Dahlgren smoothbore; 2 × 24-pdr smoothbore; 2 × 20-pdr Parrott rifle

USS Penobscot was a Unadilla-class gunboat built for the Union Navy during the American Civil War.

She was used by the Navy to patrol navigable waterways of the Confederacy to prevent the South from trading with other countries.

== Assigned to the North Atlantic Blockade ==
Penobscot, built in ninety days by C.P. Carter, Belfast, Maine, was launched 19 November 1861 and delivered to the Navy at Boston, Massachusetts, 16 January 1862. Assigned initially to the North Atlantic Blockading Squadron, Penobscot destroyed her first Confederate vessel, the schooner Sereta, grounded and abandoned off Shallotte Inlet, North Carolina, 8 June 1862.

On 1 August she seized sloop Lizzie off New Inlet and on 22 October British brig Robert Burns off Cape Fear. Again off Shallotte Inlet 3 November, she forced the British ship Pathfinder aground, then destroyed her. Continuing her patrol of the Carolina coast into the summer of 1863, she forced blockade runner Kate ashore at Smith's Island 12 July.

== Gulf of Mexico operations ==
Shifted then to the Gulf of Mexico, Penobscot joined the blockade ships cruising off the Texas coast. In early January 1864, she provided support for troops landed on the Matagorda Peninsula on 31 December. On 28 February she seized Lilly, a British schooner attempting to run the blockade at Velasco, Texas, to deliver her cargo of powder, and the next day captured schooners Stingray and John Douglas, outward bound with cargoes of cotton. On 12 July, off Galveston, Texas, the "ninety-day" gunboat intercepted the schooner James Williams with a cargo of medicine, coffee, and liquor.

== Penobscot's final operations of the war ==
By 1865 the Union stranglehold had achieved its purpose. The South was suffering for the materials necessary to wage war. On 18 February Penobscot made her last interceptions. She forced the schooners Mary Agnes and Louisa ashore at Aransas Pass and on the 19th sent a boat crew to destroy them.

== Post-war activity and final decommissioning and sale ==
After the war Penobscot returned to the U.S. East Coast. She decommissioned at New York City 31 July 1865 and on 19 October 1869 was sold, at Portsmouth, New Hampshire, to Nehemiah Gibson.
