= USS Kineo (1861) =

Gunboat of the United States Navy

- USS Kineo (foreground, 4th from left) during the Battle of Forts Jackson and St. Philip

History

United States
- Launched: 9 October 1861
- Commissioned: 8 February 1862

General characteristics
- Class & type: Unadilla-class gunboat
- Displacement: 691 tons
- Tons burthen: 507
- Length: 158 ft (48 m) (waterline)
- Beam: 28 ft (8.5 m)
- Draft: 9 ft 6 in (2.90 m) (max.)
- Depth of hold: 12 ft (3.7 m)
- Propulsion: 2 × 200 IHP 30-in bore by 18 in stroke horizontal back-acting engines; single screw
- Sail plan: Two-masted schooner
- Speed: 10 kn (11.5 mph)
- Complement: 114
- Armament: Original: 1 × 11-in Dahlgren smoothbore; 2 × 24-pdr smoothbore; 2 × 20-pdr Parrott rifle

USS Kineo was a Unadilla-class gunboat built for the United States Navy during the American Civil War.

== Service during the US Civil War ==
The first Kineo in the service of the Navy, she was launched on 9 October 1861 at Portland, Maine, by J. W. Dyer; sponsored by Miss Eunice C. Dyer, daughter of the builder, and commissioned at the Boston Navy Yard on 8 February 1862, Lt. George M. Ransom in command.

She was sent to join the forces then gathering to attack the defenses of New Orleans. On 24 April 1862, Kineo was one of the ships that battled their way past Forts Jackson and Saint Philip. Though hit by enemy cannon fire, she was able to continue up the Mississippi River and participate in the capture of the Confederacy's largest seaport.

Kineo continued her operations on the lower Mississippi for more than a year. She took part in engagements at Grand Gulf on 26 May, Baton Rouge in early August, Donaldsonville, Louisiana in October and Port Hudson in December 1862. On 14 March 1863, Kineo was tied alongside USS Monongahela for a run past enemy fortifications at Port Hudson. Their efforts were thwarted when Monongahela's rudder was disabled, but the gunboat was able to pull her larger consort out of danger. In August 1863, following further actions along the river, Kineo was sent north for repairs.

Returning to the Gulf of Mexico in March 1864, Kineo spent most of that year off the Texas coast, capturing one blockade running schooner during that time. In December, she went back to the Mississippi, where she was stationed until April 1865.

== After the war ==
USS Kineo was decommissioned in May 1865, as the Civil War was coming to an end, and was sold in October 1866. She later became the merchant schooner Lucy H. Gibson.
