= List of shipwrecks in April 1862 =

The list of shipwrecks in April 1862 includes ships sunk, foundered, grounded, or otherwise lost during April 1862.

== 1 April ==
List of shipwrecks: 1 April 1862
Ship	State	Description
Express	United Kingdom	The ship was driven ashore near Bootle, Lancashire.
Improver	United Kingdom	The schooner was driven onto the Spanish Battery Rocks, on the coast of Northumberland. She was refloated and taken in to North Shields, Northumberland in a severely leaky condition.
Llewellyn	United Kingdom	The brig was driven ashore at Gibraltar. She was on a voyage from Bahia, Brazil to Genoa, Italy.
Mars	United Kingdom	The steamship struck the Crow Rock and sank with the loss of 35 of the 41 people on board. She was on a voyage from Waterford to Bristol, Gloucestershire.
Mary Stewart	United Kingdom	The schooner sank 20 nautical miles (37 km) off the Islote de Sancti Petri, Spain. Her crew were rescued by Cristina (Spain). Mary Stewart was on a voyage from Liverpool, Lancashire to Berbice, British Guiana.
Unnamed	Netherlands	The galiot was driven onto the Spanish Battery Rocks. She was refloated and towed in to North Shields.

== 2 April ==
List of shipwrecks: 2 April 1862
Ship	State	Description
Cedarine	(United Kingdom of Great Britain and Ireland) Bermuda	The convict ship, a barque, was wrecked on the south coast of the Isle of Wight. Her ten crew, all 27 passengers and 191 convicts on board were rescued, 134 of them by the Grange Lifeboat. She was on a voyage from Bermuda to Portsmouth, Hampshire.
Kate	Confederate States of America	American Civil War, Union blockade: The schooner, a blockade runner carrying a cargo of salt, ran aground on the coast of North Carolina near Lockwood Folly Inlet while being pursued by the armed screw steamer USS Mount Vernon, bark USS Fernandina, and gunboat USS Cambridge (all United States Navy). Her crew set her on fire and abandoned ship, but United States Navy personnel boarded her and extinguished the fire, then set her on fire again and abandoned her when Confederate forces on shore opened fire on them. United States Navy warships later shelled her. She apparently was refloated by the Confederates.
Maid of Erin	United Kingdom	The ship ran aground at North Shields, Northumberland. She was on a voyage from London to North Shields. She was later refloated.

== 3 April ==
List of shipwrecks: 3 April 1862
Ship	State	Description
Bella Donna	United Kingdom	The barque was severely damaged at Palermo, Sicily, Italy.
Cygnet	Confederate States of America	American Civil War, Union blockade: The pilot boat was captured at Carrabelle, Florida by boats from the United States Navy blockade ships and burned.
Floyd	Confederate States of America	American Civil War, Union blockade: The Schooner was a few miles above Carrabelle, Florida by boats from USS Mercedita. Unable to float over the Bar at the Mouth of the river they grounded in 7 feet of water and was burned after her cargo of cotton was removed.
Mary Olive	Confederate States of America	American Civil War, Union blockade: The pilot boat was captured at Carrabelle, Florida by boats from the United States Navy blockade ships and burned.
New Island	Confederate States of America	American Civil War, Union blockade: The Schooner was captured a few miles above Carrabelle, Florida by boats from USS Mercedita. Unable to float over the Bar at the Mouth of the river they grounded in 7 feet of water and was burned after her cargo of cotton was removed.
CSS Red Rover	Confederate States Navy	American Civil War: Confederate forces scuttled the 625-ton sidewheel paddle steamer in the Mississippi River behind Island Number Ten. She was refloated and repaired by Union forces and placed in service as the first Union hospital ship.
Rose	Confederate States of America	The Schooner was captured a few miles above Carrabelle, Florida by boats from USS Mercedita. Unable to float over the Bar at the Mouth of the river they grounded in 7 feet of water and was burned after her cargo of cotton was removed.

== 5 April ==
List of shipwrecks: 5 April 1862
Ship	State	Description
Admiral	Confederate States of America	American Civil War: The 244-ton sternwheel paddle steamer was scuttled by Confederate forces in the Mississippi River near Island Number Ten.
C. D. Brewer	United Kingdom	The ship was driven ashore on Skagen, Denmark.
John and James	United Kingdom	The smack ran aground at Aberystwyth, Cardiganshire. Her crew were rescued.
Robert and Betsy	(United Kingdom of Great Britain and Ireland) New Zealand	The brigantine parted her cable while at anchor in Oamaru harbour and drifted ashore. All hands were saved.
Skjoldinoin	Norway	The brig was driven ashore at "Bjellond Trimoe".

== 6 April ==
List of shipwrecks: 6 April 1862
Ship	State	Description
Columbia	Confederate States of America	American Civil War, Union blockade: The schooner, captured off the coast of Texas on 5 April by a launch from the armed screw steamer USS Montgomery (United States Navy) while bound from Galveston, Texas, to Kingston, Jamaica, in an attempt to run the Union blockade with a cargo of cotton, was destroyed by the launch′s crew near Fort San Luis on San Luis Pass.
Effort	United Kingdom	The ship schooner ran aground on the Newcombe Sand, in the North Sea off the coast of Norfolk. She was on a voyage from South Shields, County Durham to London. She was refloated and resumed her voyage.
Elsina	Kingdom of Hanover	The ship ran aground on the Horn Reef. She was on a voyage from Middlesbrough, Yorkshire, United Kingdom to Leer. She was refloated and put in to "Ostmatron".
Harmony, and James Watt	United Kingdom	The sloop Harmony collided with the schooner James Watt and sank off Islandmagee, County Antrim. James Watt was beached on the shores of the Belfast Lough. She was later refloated and taken in to Belfast, County Antrim.
Inkermann	United Kingdom	The barque collided with the barque Janna Cœli (France) and sank in the Mediterranean Sea 12 nautical miles (22 km) east of Tarifa, Spain with the loss of four of her thirteen crew. Survivors were rescued by Janna Cœli. Inkermann was on a voyage from South Shields, County Durham to Genoa, Italy.
CSS John Simonds	Confederate States Navy	American Civil War: Confederate forces scuttled the 1,024-ton sidewheel paddle steamer as a blockship in the Mississippi River near Island Number Ten.
CSS Kanawha	Confederate States Navy	American Civil War: Confederate forces scuttled the 147-ton sternwheel paddle steamer as a blockship in the Mississippi River near Island Number Ten.
Solstice	United Kingdom	The barque foundered in the Grand Banks of Newfoundland. Her twelve crew were rescued by Galena (Bremen). Solstice was on a voyage from New York, United States to Queenstown, County Cork.
Venus	(United Kingdom of Great Britain and Ireland) New South Wales	The schooner was last sighted off the coast of New South Wales on this date. Presumed subsequently foundered with the loss of all hands.

== 7 April ==
List of shipwrecks: 7 April 1862
Ship	State	Description
Bacalian	United Kingdom	The schooner was driven ashore on Anholt, Denmark. She was on a voyage from Sligo to Stettin. She was refloated and taken in to Helsingør, Denmark in a leaky condition.
Caroline	United Kingdom	The schooner was driven ashore near Landskrona, Sweden. She was on a voyage from Hartlepool, County Durham to Landskrona. She was refloated on 10 April and taken in to Landskrona.
Charlotte	United Kingdom	The brig ran aground on the Middle Patch, in Liverpool Bay.
CSS Grampus	Confederate States Army	American Civil War, Battle of Island Number Ten: The sternwheel paddle steamer was scuttled in the Mississippi River between New Madrid, Missouri, and Lake County, Tennessee, to prevent her capture by Union forces. She was refloated by Union forces and placed in service as a receiving ship.
CSS Mohawk	Confederate States of America	American Civil War, Battle of Island Number Ten: The 100-ton sternwheel paddle steamer, possibly a gunboat, was scuttled by Confederate forces in the Mississippi River at Island Number Ten.
CSS New Orleans	Confederate States Navy	American Civil War, Battle of Island Number Ten: The floating battery was scuttled in the Mississippi River between New Madrid, Missouri and Lake County, Tennessee, to prevent her capture by Union forces.
Phoenix	(United Kingdom of Great Britain and Ireland) New Zealand	The screw steamer sank in Auckland Harbour during a severe gale. The Township (qv) was wrecked during the same gale, and many other ships were damaged.
Thomas Young	United Kingdom	The brig was driven ashore on Amrum, Duchy of Holstein.. Her ten crew were rescued. She was on a voyage from South Shields, County Durham to Hamburg.
Township	(United Kingdom of Great Britain and Ireland) New Zealand	The schooner broke up when driven ashore in Auckland Harbour during a severe gale. The Phoenix (qv) was wrecked during the same gale, and many other ships were damaged.
CSS Yazoo	Confederate States Navy	American Civil War, Battle of Island Number Ten: Abandoned by the Confederates, the 371-ton sidewheel paddle steamer was captured and scuttled by Union forces in the Mississippi River at Island Number Ten.

== 8 April ==
List of shipwrecks: 8 April 1862
Ship	State	Description
Augusta	Norway	The barque was driven ashore at Dragør. She was on a voyage from Newcastle upon Tyne, Northumberland, United Kingdom to Nykøbing.
Cactus	United Kingdom	The ship ran aground off Skagen, Denmark. She was on a voyage from Blyth, Northumberland to Korsør, Denmark. She was refloated and put in to the Rivefjord in a leaky condition.
Charlotte Spences	United Kingdom	The ship ran aground on the Foreness Rock, off Margate, Kent.
Deborah Pennell	United States	The ship was driven ashore 2 nautical miles (3.7 km) north of Cape Henlopen, Delaware. She was on a voyage from Philadelphia, Pennsylvania to Dublin, United Kingdom.
Globe	(United Kingdom of Great Britain and Ireland) Jersey	The brigantine struck the Rocques Donores, off Jersey and foundered. Her crew were rescued. She was on a voyage from Jersey to Boston, Massachusetts, United States.
Henry	United Kingdom	The ship was driven ashore at Ramsgate, Kent. She was on a voyage from Hartlepool, County Durham to Newhaven, Sussex.
Louise	France	The ship collided with the barque Balcombe or Balkan (United Kingdom) and foundered in the English Channel18 nautical miles (33 km) south of The Lizard, Cornwall, United Kingdom with the loss of a crew member. She was on a voyage from Saint-Malo, Ille-et-Vilaine to Swansea, Glamorgan, United Kingdom.
Nymph	United Kingdom	The ship ran aground at Port Eynon, Glamorgan. She was on a voyage from Plymouth, Devon to Port Eynon. She was refloated the next day and taken in to Port Eynon.{
Prince Albert	United Kingdom	The brig was run into by the steamship Diana (United Kingdom) and sank in the Groot Noordhollandsch Kanaal. Shew as on a voyage from Sunderland, County Durham to Amsterdam, North Holland, Netherlands. She was refloated on 19 April and was towed in to the Nieuwe Diep.
Savoyard	United Kingdom	The ship ran aground on the Foreness Rock.
Sparkling Wave	United States	The ship ran aground on the Goodwin Sands, Kent. She was on a voyage from South Shields, County Durham to New York. She was later refloated but found to be severely leaky. She was taken in to London for repairs.

== 9 April ==
List of shipwrecks: 9 April 1862
Ship	State	Description
Jessie	Bremen	The brigantine struck a sunke rock near Oban, Argyllshire, United Kingdom and was beached in Oban Bay. She was on a voyage from Liverpool, Lancashire to Montrose, Forfarshire, United Kingdom.
Twellinger	Denmark	The ship was driven ashore at Copenhagen. She was on a voyage from Newcastle upon Tyne, Northumberland, United Kingdom to Kastrup.
Unidentified brig	United States	American Civil War: Loaded with a cargo of cotton, furniture, and loot stolen from residences on Edisto Island off the coast of South Carolina, the brig was wrecked on the coast of Edisto Island.

== 10 April ==
List of shipwrecks: 10 April 1862
Ship	State	Description
Lady Herbert	United Kingdom	The schooner sank in the English Channel. A message in a bottle confirming the ship's loss washed up at Plymouth, Devon on 29 April.
Liverpool	United Kingdom	American Civil War, Union blockade: Pursued by the sidewheel paddle steamer USS Keystone State (United States Navy), the 150- or 180-ton barque, a blockade runner, ran aground outside North Inlet, South Carolina, Confederate States of America and was burned by her crew.
Pocohontas	United States	The steamship was driven ashore near Long Point, Province of Canada, British North America. She was on a voyage from Toledo, Ohio to Buffalo, New York.

== 11 April ==
List of shipwrecks: 11 April 1862
Ship	State	Description
Albert	United Kingdom	The ship was driven ashore and severely damaged at Charlestown, Cornwall.
Brise Lames	France	The brig was wrecked north east of Abrevach, Finistère. Her crew were rescued. She was on a voyage from Sunderland, County Durham, United Kingdom to Bayonne, Basses-Pyrénées.
Liberal	United Kingdom	The schooner ran aground on the Herd Sand, in the North Sea off the coast of County Durham. Her crew were rescued by the South Shields Lifeboat. Liberal was on a voyage from Peterhead, Aberdeenshire to South Shields, County Durham. She was later refloated and taken in to South Shields.

== 12 April ==
List of shipwrecks: 12 April 1862
Ship	State	Description
Alma	(United Kingdom of Great Britain and Ireland) Jersey	The ship was driven ashore near Donaghadee, County Down. She was on a voyage from Donaghadee to Douglas, Isle of Man. She was refloated and put in to Belfast, County Antrim in a leaky condition.
Elizabeth McKenzie	United Kingdom	The ship foundered east of Cape Wrath, Caithness with the loss of all hands. She was on a voyage from Scrabster, Caithness to Ullapool, Ross-shire.
Integrity	United Kingdom	The barque ran aground on Scharhörn. She was on a voyage from Sunderland, County Durham to Hamburg. She was refloated and taken in to Cuxhaven in a sinking condition.
Lion	United Kingdom	The smack ran aground and sank at Cemaes Head, Pembrokeshire. Her three crew were rescued. She was on a voyage from Swansea, Glamorgan to Cardigan.
HMS Pelican	Royal Navy	The Camelion-class sloop ran aground in the Mediterranean Sea. Subsequently refloated, repaired and returned to service.
Samuel Adams	Unknown	American Civil War, Union blockade: Attempting to run the Union blockade with a cargo of salt, candles, soap, olive oil, rum, and other goods, the schooner was forced aground by United States Navy warships on the western end of Isle of Palms off the coast of South Carolina, Confederate States of America.

== 13 April ==
List of shipwrecks: 13 April 1862
Ship	State	Description
Active	United Kingdom	The brig was driven ashore at Neustadt in Holstein, Duchy of Holstein. She was on a voyage from Liverpool, Lancashire to Neustadt in Holstein.
Fairy	United Kingdom	The smack struck rocks at Montrose, Forfarshire. She was on a voyage from Lossiemouth, Moray to Montrose. She was refloated and taken in to Montrose in a severely damaged condition.
Heroine	United Kingdom	The schooner ran aground on the Crow Rocks, off the north Devon coast and was damaged. She was on a voyage from London tpo Bideford, Devon.
Lion	United Kingdom	The ship ran aground and sank at Fishguard, Pembrokeshire. Her crew were rescued. She was on a voyage from Swansea, Glamorgan to Cardigan.
Picton	United Kingdom	The ship foundered in the North Sea off the coast of Yorkshire.

== 14 April ==
List of shipwrecks: 14 April 1862
Ship	State	Description
Karnack	United States	The steamship was wrecked at Nassau, Bahamas.
Erebus	United States Army	The screw tug accidentally burned to the waterline without loss of life on the Mississippi River and sank 3,800 yards (3,475 meters) below Fort Pillow, Tennessee, Confederate States of America. She was refloated, repaired, and returned to service.

== 15 April ==
List of shipwrecks: 15 April 1862
Ship	State	Description
Dacotah	United States	The 90-ton St. Louis and Hannibal Railroad sidewheel paddle steamer foundered with the loss of four lives in the Missouri River at St. Joseph, Missouri, when a tornado struck her.
Empire	United States	The whaling barque (or ship) was wrecked when it was driven onto rocks at Wangaroa Bay in New Zealand's Chatham Islands. All hands were saved.
Euphrosyne	United Kingdom	The steamship struck a sunken rock and sank 10 nautical miles (19 km) off Cape Corobedo, Spain. All 50 people on board survived. She was on a voyage from Alexandria, Egypt to Liverpool, Lancashire.
Genius	Prussia	The barque was driven ashore at Cape Arkona, Rügen. She was on a voyage from Stettin to and English port. She was refloated and taken in to Stralsund for repairs.
Harriet	United Kingdom	The smack foundered in the English Channel 3 nautical miles (5.6 km) south east of Torcross, Devon with the loss of all hands.
Harry Hastings	United Kingdom	The ship departed from Akyab, Burma for Falmouth, Cornwall. No further trace, presumed foundered with the loss of all hands.

== 16 April ==
List of shipwrecks: 16 April 1862
Ship	State	Description
Alfred	United Kingdom	The schooner was wrecked near Aberffraw, Anglesey. Her crew were rescued. She was on a voyage from Wicklow to Flint.
Leda	United Kingdom	The schooner was driven ashore at Redcar, Yorkshire. She was on a voyage from South Shields, County Durham to Great Yarmouth, Norfolk. She was refloated and resumed her voyage.
Levana	United Kingdom	The ship foundered off "Auchanhoan Head", Argyllshire, with the loss of all hands.
Ruby	United Kingdom	The smack was wrecked at Newhaven, Sussex. Her crew were rescued. She was on a voyage from Shoreham-by-Sea, Sussex to Newhaven.

== 17 April ==
List of shipwrecks: 17 April 1862
Ship	State	Description
Guanita	United Kingdom	The ship ran aground in the Rock Channel. She was on a voyage from Limerick to Liverpool, Lancashire. She was refloated and taken in to Liverpool.
Vedra	United Kingdom	The brig ran aground on the Gunfleet Sand, in the North Sea off the coast of Essex. She was on a voyage from Seaham, County Durham to London. Vedra was refloated but found to be severely leaky. She was assisted in to Harwich, Essex by the smack Beulah (United Kingdom).

== 18 April ==
List of shipwrecks: 18 April 1862
Ship	State	Description
Everdina Elizabeth	Netherlands	The barque departed from Newcastle upon Tyne, Northumberland, United Kingdom for Hong Kong. No further trace, presumed foundered with the loss of all hands.
Mechens	United Kingdom	The ship foundered in the Mediterranean Sea. Her crew were rescued. She was on a voyage from Cardiff, Glamorgan to Ancona, Papal States.

== 19 April ==
List of shipwrecks: 19 April 1862
Ship	State	Description
Lussin	Flag unknown	The ship ran aground on the Flemish Banks, in the North Sea off the coast of Belgium. She was refloated with assistance from the steamship Pascha (United Kingdom), found to be leaky and was beached off Vlissingen, Zeeland, Netherlands.
USS Maria J. Carlton	United States Navy	American Civil War, Battle of Forts Jackson and St. Philip: The mortar schooner was sunk on the Mississippi River just below Fort Jackson and Fort St. Philip, Louisiana, Confederate States of America by a shot that tore through her magazine deck and hull, wounding two crewmen. Union forces destroyed her remains on 25 April.
Mersey	United Kingdom	The ship was run down in the Kattegat by the steamship Dwina (United Kingdom). Her crew were rescued. She was on a voyage from South Shields, County Durham to Helsingborg, Sweden.
CSS Rappahannock	Confederate States Navy	American Civil War: The armed sidewheel paddle steamer was burned by Confederate forces on the Rappahannock River at Fredericksburg, Virginia.
Reine del Oceana	Spain	The ship was destroyed by fire in the Atlantic Ocean. Her crew were rescued by Trebolgan (United Kingdom). Reine del Oceana was on a voyage from Liverpool, Lancashire, United Kingdom to Manila, Spanish East Indies.
Shooting Star	United Kingdom	The barque ran aground on the Gunfleet Sand, in the North Sea off the coast of Essex. She was on a voyage from Newcastle upon Tyne, Northumberland to Rochester, Kent. She was refloated with the assistance of several smacks and assisted in to Harwich, Essex.
Traviata	United Kingdom	The pilot boat foundered in the Bristol Channel off Lundy Island, Devon.
Walter Scott	United Kingdom	The ship was destroyed by fire off Vlissingen.

== 20 April ==
List of shipwrecks: 20 April 1862
Ship	State	Description
Armegina	Netherlands	The koff was driven ashore on Scharhörn. She was on a voyage from London, United Kingdom to Glückstadt, Duchy of Schleswig. She was refloated and taken in to Cuxhaven in a sinking condition.
Berenguela	Spanish Navy	A pinnace from the Petronila-class frigate was wrecked on the Los Homos Rocks, off Veracruz, Mexico with the loss of five sailors. Survivors were rescued by French Navy ships.
Catherine Sophie	Norway	The ship was driven ashore and wrecked on Skagen, Denmark. She was on a voyage from Skive, Denmark to London.
Criteria	United Kingdom	The ship ran aground on the Newcombe Sand, in the North Sea off the coast of Suffolk. She was on a voyage from Hull, Yorkshire to Brixham, Devon. She was refloated and towed in to Lowestoft, Suffolk.
Regulus	United Kingdom	The ship was driven ashore at Veracruz.
Tanger	French Navy	The Tanger-class corvette broke from her moorings and was driven into Essex (United Kingdom) at Veracruz. She was severely damaged and ran aground. Tanger was refloated with assistance from the frigate Cacique and was escorted by Cacique to Havana, Cuba for repairs.
Vision	United Kingdom	The schooner ran aground in the North Sea off the mouth of the Agger Canal and was wrecked. Her crew were rescued. She was on a voyage from Newcastle upon Tyne, Northumberland to Königsberg, Prussia.
Unnamed	Mexico	The galiot was driven ashore at Veracruz.
Unnamed	United States	The clipper was driven ashore at Veracruz.

== 21 April ==
List of shipwrecks: 21 April 1862
Ship	State	Description
Avenger	(United Kingdom of Great Britain and Ireland) New South Wales	The ketch lost off Wellington Head, New Zealand with the loss of all hands. She was on a voyage from Otago, New Zealand to Sydney. The wreck was found at the mouth of Wellington Harbour, New Zealand, late in the month. There were two bodies on board.
CSS Bienville	Confederate States Navy	American Civil War: The gunboat was destroyed by her officers in Louisiana in the Bogue Falaya River or on Lake Pontchartrain to prevent her capture by Union forces.
John and William	United Kingdom	The ship was driven ashore near Hirtshals, Denmark. Her crew were rescued. She was on a voyage from Helsingborg, Sweden to Hartlepool, County Durham.
Mary Merrill	United States	The ship went aground in Wellington Harbour, New Zealand during a heavy gale.

== 22 April ==
List of shipwrecks: 22 April 1862
Ship	State	Description
Aurora	Kingdom of Hanover	The ship was driven ashore near Tornby, Sweden. Her crew were rescued. She was on a voyage from London, United Kingdom to Königsberg, Prussia.
Cleveland	United Kingdom	The schooner was run into by Amazon (France and was abandoned. Three of her four crew were rescued by Amazon, the fourth took to a boat. He was rescued by Spring Flower (United Kingdom). Cleveland was on a voyage from Warkworth, Northumberland to London.
Merrion Lass	United Kingdom	The smack ran aground at Aberdovey, Cardiganshire. Her three crew were rescued by the Aberdovey Lifeboat.

== 23 April ==
List of shipwrecks: 23 April 1862
Ship	State	Description
Alexandria	(United Kingdom of Great Britain and Ireland) Guernsey	The schooner collided with the chasse-marée Leonnia (France) and then ran aground on the Longsand, in the North Sea off the coast of Essex, where she was wrecked. Her crew were rescued by Leonnia. Alexandria was on a voyage from Newcastle upon Tyne, Northumberland to Guernsey.
Argo	United Kingdom	The brig was driven ashore near "Cosevon".
Friends	United Kingdom	The brig ran aground on the Longsand. She was on a voyage from Newcastle upon Tyne to Dunkirk, Nord, France. She was refloated with assistance from the smack Queen Victoria (United Kingdom), which assisted her in to Harwich, Essex in a severely leaky condition where she was beached. Subsequently repaired and returned to service.
Maria Soames	United Kingdom	The ship ran aground at Sunderland, County Durham. She was on a voyage from Sunderland to Callao, Peru. She was refloated and resumed her voyage, but consequently put in to Grimsby, Lincolnshire in a leaky condition.
Licanter	United Kingdom	The ship was wrecked at Saint John, New Brunswick, British North America. She was on a voyage from Liverpool, Lancashire to Saint John.
Michens	United Kingdom	The ship foundered. Her crew were rescued. She was on a voyage from Cardiff, Glamorgan to Ancona, Papal States.
Sardinian	United Kingdom	The ship was destroyed by fire at Rangoon, Burma.

== 24 April ==
List of shipwrecks: 24 April 1862
Ship	State	Description
CSS Belle Algerine	Confederate States Navy	American Civil War, Battle of Forts Jackson and St. Philip: The gunboat was accidentally rammed and sunk on the Mississippi River in Plaquemines Parish, Louisiana, by the gunboat CSS Governor Moore (Confederate States Navy). The portion of Belle Algerine remaining above water was then burned.
Eunice	United States	The 231-ton sternwheel paddle steamer collided with the sternwheel paddle steamer Commodore Perry (United States) and sank in the Ohio River near Ashland, Kentucky, without injury to anyone on board. She later was refloated.
CSS General Breckinridge	Confederate States Navy	American Civil War: The sternwheel ram was burned on the Mississippi River at Fort Jackson, Louisiana, to prevent her capture by Union forces.
CSS General Lovell	Confederate States Navy	American Civil War, Battle of Forts Jackson and St. Philip: The sidewheel ram was burned by her crew on the Mississippi River in Plaquemines Parish, Louisiana, to prevent her capture by Union forces.
CSS General Quitman	Confederate States Navy	American Civil War: The cottonclad ram was set afire by gunfire by the steamer USS Varuna (United States Navy), ran aground on the bank of the Mississippi River in[Louisiana, and was burned to prevent her capture by Union forces.
CSS Governor Moore	Confederate States Navy	American Civil War, Battle of Forts Jackson and St. Philip: The gunboat was disabled by gunfire from United States Navy warships on the Mississippi River in Plaquemines Parish, Louisiana. She drifted ashore with 64 dead. Her surviving crew set her on fire to prevent her capture by Union forces, and she exploded when the flames reached her ammunition magazine.
CSS Launch No. 3	Confederate States Navy	American Civil War, Battle of Forts Jackson and St. Philip: The steam launch was lost on the Mississippi River in Plaquemines Parish, Louisiana, in combat with United States Navy forces.
CSS Manassas	Confederate States Navy	American Civil War, Battle of Forts Jackson and St. Philip: The ironclad warship was forced aground by the sidewheel paddle frigate USS Mississippi (United States Navy) on the Mississippi River in Plaquemines Parish, Louisiana. Her crew abandoned ship, and heavy gunfire from Mississippi set her ablaze. She slipped off the bank, drifted downstream, and exploded.
CSS Mosher	Confederate States Navy	American Civil War, Battle of Forts Jackson and St. Philip: Attempting to tow a fire ship alongside a heavy sloop-of-war – probably USS Hartford (United States Navy) – on the Mississippi River in Plaquemines Parish, Louisiana, the unarmed screw tug suffered a hit from a broadside fired by the sloop-of-war that caused her boiler to explode and sank immediately with the loss of all hands.
CSS Music	Confederate States Navy	American Civil War, Battle of Forts Jackson and St. Philip: The sidewheel paddle steamer was destroyed by the Confederates to prevent her capture by Union forces.
CSS Phoenix	Confederate States Navy	American Civil War, Battle of Forts Jackson and St. Philip: The tug, operating as a tender, was destroyed on the Mississippi River in Plaquemines Parish, Louisiana, in combat with United States Navy ships.
CSS Star	Confederate States Army	American Civil War, Battle of Forts Jackson and St. Philip: The tug was destroyed on the Mississippi River in Plaquemines Parish, Louisiana, in combat with a United States Navy gunboat.
CSS Stonewall Jackson	Confederate States Navy	American Civil War, Battle of Forts Jackson and St. Philip: Damaged by gunfire by the steamer USS Varuna (United States Navy), the sidewheel ram, was driven ashore on the banks of the Mississippi River in Plaquemines Parish, Louisiana, by the screw sloop-of-war USS Oneida (United States Navy) and burned.
Sweepstakes	United States	The clipper ran aground in the Sunda Straits in the Netherlands East Indies. She was refloated later that day but was declared a constructive total loss and was sold in Batavia, Netherland East Indies, for scrap.
Texas	Confederate States of America	American Civil War, Battle of Forts Jackson and St. Philip: The 1,223-ton sidewheel paddle steamer, possibly after being converted into a gunboat, was destroyed on the Mississippi River in Plaquemines Parish, Louisiana.
USS Varuna	United States Navy	Line engraving of USS Varuna sinking, published ca. the 1860s. American Civil War, Battle of Forts Jackson and St. Philip: The steamship sank in the Mississippi River in Plaquemines Parish, Louisiana, after being rammed by the steamer CSS Governor Moore and the cottonclad sidewheel ram CSS Stonewall Jackson (both Confederate States Navy).
CSS Warrior	Confederate States Navy	American Civil War, Battle of Forts Jackson and St. Philip: The sidewheel ram was hit by a broadside of 11 shells with five-second fuses by the screw sloop-of-war USS Brooklyn (United States Navy) on the Mississippi River in Plaquemines Parish, Louisiana. After the shells detonated inside her, she was beached on the bank of the river and began to burn immediately. The fire destroyed her.
Unidentified schooner	Unknown	American Civil War, Union blockade: Pursued by the schooner USS Isilda (United States Navy), the schooner ran hard aground in shoal water while standing in toward Cedar Key, Florida. Confederate States of America. When an armed launch from Isilda approached the schooner on 26 April, the schooner′s crew blew her up.

== 25 April ==
List of shipwrecks: 25 April 1862
Ship	State	Description
CSS Mississippi	Confederate States Navy	American Civil War: The incomplete ironclad warship was burned at New Orleans, Louisiana, to prevent her capture by Union forces.
CSRC Pickens	Confederate States of America	American Civil War: The schooner was burned at Algiers, Louisiana, to prevent her capture by Union forces.
Pioneer	Confederate States of America	American Civil War: The submarine was scuttled in the New Basin Canal in New Orleans to prevent her capture by Union forces.
Washington	Confederate States of America	American Civil War: The brig was scuttled at the docks in New Orleans to prevent her capture by Union forces.
William M. Morrison	Confederate States of America	American Civil War: The 662-ton sidwheel paddle steamer was set afire and cast adrift on the Mississippi River at New Orleans to prevent her capture by Union forces as the fleet of Flag Officer David Glasgow Farragut approached. She collided with the ferry boat at Canal Street and later was salvaged.
Various unidentified vessels	Confederate States of America	American Civil War: Various unidentified vessels were burned at New Orleans to prevent their capture by Union forces, including three burning vessels that went adrift and floated down the Mississippi River and a number of steamboats carrying cargoes of cotton that were set afire at the city′s wharves.

== 26 April ==
List of shipwrecks: 26 April 1862
Ship	State	Description
Chase	United Kingdom	American Civil War, Union blockade: The 20-ton schooner was forced aground on Raccoon Key or Romain Light in Bull's Bay off the coast of South Carolina, Confederate States of America by the armed clipper USS Onward (United States Navy). Attempts to refloat her over the next few days failed, so she was burned.
CSS Resolute	Confederate States Navy	American Civil War: The sidewheel ram, aground in the Mississippi River 1 mile (1.6 km) above Fort Jackson, Louisiana, since the Battle of Forts Jackson and St. Philip on 24 April, was burned by the Confederates to prevent her capture by Union forces.

== 27 April ==
List of shipwrecks: 27 April 1862
Ship	State	Description
CSS Anglo-Norman	Confederate States Navy	American Civil War: The 558-ton armed sidewheel paddle steamer was burned by Confederate forces at New Orleans, Louisiana, to prevent her capture by Union forces.
Hannah	United Kingdom	The sloop ran aground on the Bridgirdle Sand, in the North Sea off the coast of Norfolk. She was on a voyage from Lowestoft, Suffolk to Hunstanton, Norfolk. She was refloated on 1 May.
Jason	United Kingdom	The ship ran aground on the Fulta Sand, off the coast of Ceylon.

== 28 April ==
List of shipwrecks: 28 April 1862
Ship	State	Description
CSS Defiance	Confederate States Navy	American Civil War: The cottonclad ram was burned on the Mississippi River at Fort Jackson and Fort St. Philip, Louisiana, to prevent her capture by Union forces.
Leander	United Kingdom	The ship was driven ashore near Ventava, Courland Governorate. She was on a voyage from Riga, Russia to London.
CSS Louisiana	Confederate States Navy	Illustration published in 1887 of CSS Louisiana exploding. American Civil War: The ironclad sidewheel paddle steamer was burned by her crew on the Mississippi River near Fort Jackson, Louisiana, to prevent her capture by Union forces. She exploded violently when the flames detonated her magazine, killing one soldier at nearby Fort St. Philip.
CSS McRae	Confederate States Navy	American Civil War: The screw sloop-of-war was scuttled along the city wharf at New Orleans, Louisiana, where she had arrived in a severely damaged condition the previous evening.
Polka	United Kingdom	The schooner was wrecked on the Whitby Rock. Her crew survived. She was on a voyage from Seaham, County Durham to Maldon, Essex.
Samuel	United Kingdom	The cutter struck the wreck of the steamship Yarborough (United Kingdom) and sank.
Unidentified brig	Confederate States of America	American Civil War, Union blockade: Carrying a cargo of cotton, the brig was burned at Fort Livingston, Louisiana to prevent her capture by approaching United States Navy ships.

== 29 April ==
List of shipwrecks: 29 April 1862
Ship	State	Description
Dewdrop	Confederate States of America	American Civil War: The schooner was towed ashore and burned in the Mississippi River below New Orleans, Louisiana, by the gunboat USS Owasco (United States Navy).
Elizabeth and Catherine	United Kingdom	The ship foundered in the Mediterranean Sea. Her crew were rescued by Julie (United Kingdom). Elizabeth and Catherine was on a voyage from Gibraltar to Quebec City, Province of Canada, British North America.
Hubert	United Kingdom	The ship was wrecked in the Isles of Scilly. She was on a voyage from Alexandria, Egypt to a British port.
Isabella	United Kingdom	The steam transport caught fire at Portsmouth, Hampshire and was scuttled.
Joseph H. Toone	Confederate States of America	American Civil War: The schooner was burned on the Mississippi River at Fort Jackson, Louisiana, by United States Navy forces.
Ocean	United Kingdom	The ship was destroyed by fire at Rangoon, Burma.
Tallahassee	Confederate States of America	American Civil War: The steamboat was towed ashore and burned in the Mississippi River below New Orleans by the gunboat USS Owasco (United States Navy).
Warburton	United Kingdom	The barque was driven ashore and wrecked at Ringabella Point, County Cork. Her crew were rescued. She was on a voyage from Queenstown, County Cork to Quebec City, Province of Canada, British North America.

== 30 April ==
List of shipwrecks: 30 April 1862
Ship	State	Description
Phoenix	Norway	The brig ran aground on the Longsand, in the North Sea off the coast of Essex, United Kingdom. She was on a voyage from Skien to Falmouth, Cornwall, United Kingdom. She was refloated with assistance from Alfred, Aurora's Increase and Volunteer (all United Kingdom).
Silistria	United Kingdom	The ship collided with Narcissus (United Kingdom) and foundered in the North Sea off the coast of Yorkshire. Her crew survived.
Telemachus	United Kingdom	The ship was abandoned and subsequently foundered. She was on a voyage from Cardiff, Glamorgan to Falmouth, Cornwall.
Tres Graces	Spain	The ship was driven ashore at San Miguel. Her crew were rescued. She was on a voyage form Figueira da Foz, Portugal to Alicante.

== Unknown date ==
List of shipwrecks: Unknown date 1862
Ship	State	Description
Aramingo	United States	The clipper ran aground near Futlah Point, in the Hooghly River. She was on a voyage from Calcutta, India to New York. She was refloated, but then collided with the tug Powerful ( (United Kingdom of Great Britain and Ireland) India).
Aura	United Kingdom	The barque was wrecked on Barbuda. Her crew were rescued. She was on a voyage from Barbados to London.
CSS Bienville	Confederate States Navy	American Civil War: The incomplete sidewheel gunboat was burned on the Bogue Falaya River at Bayou St. John, New Orleans, Louisiana, to prevent her capture by Union forces.
Brothers	(United Kingdom of Great Britain and Ireland) New Zealand	The ketch was wrecked at the mouth of the Warehama (Whareama) River, New Zealand, about the middle of the month.
CSS Carondelet	Confederate States Navy	American Civil War: The steamer was burned in Louisiana on Lake Pontchartrain, on the Bogue Falaya River, or on the Tchefuncte River to prevent her capture by Union forces.
Catherine	(Denmark) Duchy of Schleswig	The ship was driven ashore at Memel, Prussia.
Director	United Kingdom	The ship was wrecked on the Florida Reef before 11 April. She was on a voyage from Jamaica to London.
Geneviève	France	The ship was wrecked at "Othgo".
Harvest Home	United Kingdom	The ship was abandoned in the Atlantic Ocean 200 nautical miles (370 km) off Cape Clear Island, County Cork. Her crew were rescued by Australian (United Kingdom). Harvest Home was on a voyage from Swansea, Glamorgan to Table Bay.
CSS Jackson	Confederate States Navy	American Civil War: The gunboat was burned at or near New Orleans, Louisiana, to prevent her capture by Union forces.
Johanna Margaretha	Netherlands	The ship was driven ashore at Memel.
Lafayette	Confederate States of America	American Civil War, Union blockade: Captured on 4 April by boats from the barque USS Pursuit (United States Navy) in St. Andrews Bay, Florida, the sloop sank in the Gulf of Mexico off the coast of Florida while under tow to Key West by the captured steamer Florida ( Confederate States of America), which was under the control of a Union prize crew.
CSS Launch No. 6	Confederate States Navy	American Civil War The steam launch was lost on the Mississippi River in Plaquemines Parish, Louisiana, either in combat with United States Navy forces on 24 April during the Battle of Forts Jackson and St. Philip or burned on 28 April below the forts.
Lisette	Kingdom of Hanover	The schooner was driven ashore in Sari Siglai Bay after 16 April. She was on a voyage from London to the Danube. She was refloated on 22 April and resumed her voyage.
Mario Anna	United Kingdom	The ship was driven ashore in the Hooghly River. She was on a voyage from Calcutta, India to Belle Isle.
Mary Ann	United Kingdom	The ship foundered. Her crew were rescued. She was on a voyage from London to Bordeaux, Gironde, France.
Napoleon III	United Kingdom	The ship was wrecked on the coast of Portugal with the loss of nine lives.
CSS Oregon	Confederate States Navy	American Civil War: The screw gunboat was scuttled in Louisiana either the Tchefuncte River or the Bogue Falaya River below Covington, Louisiana to prevent her capture by Union forces.
CSS Pamlico	Confederate States Navy	American Civil War: The sidewheel paddle steamer was burned on Lake Pontchartrain to prevent her capture by Union forces.
Petrel	(United Kingdom of Great Britain and Ireland) New Zealand	The ketch was wrecked at the mouth of the Pōrangahau River, New Zealand, about the middle of the month.
Prince	Confederate States of America	American Civil War: The sidewheel paddle steamer was sunk by Confederate forces in the Mississippi River prior to the Battle of Island Number Ten to prevent her capture by Union forces.
Prince Alfred	United Kingdom	The brig was driven ashore on the coast of America. She was on a voyage from New York to Halifax, Nova Scotia, British North America. She was refloated and taken in to Newport, Rhode Island, United States, where she arrived on 7 April.
Shanghae	Denmark	The ship was driven ashore on Skagen. She was on a voyage from Frederiksberg to London. She was refloated and taken in to Fredrikshavn.
Sir Robert Peel	Unknown	American Civil War, Union blockade: Pursued by United States Navy warships, the schooner ran aground on the coast of South Carolina, Confederate States of America in early April. Her crew burned her to prevent her capture by Union forces.
Tongawanda	Unknown	The schooner capsized on the coast of California 12 miles (19 km) north of the San Francisco Heads.
Trestermaoa	Unknown	The ship was lost whilst on a voyage from Singapore, Straits Settlements to Macao, China.
Virginia	Confederate States of America	American Civil War: The 548-ton sidewheel paddle steamer was burned by Confederate forces at Fredericksburg, Virginia before 19 April to prevent her capture by Union forces.
William Woodside	United Kingdom	The ship was abandoned in the Indian Ocean before 18 April. She was on a voyage from Moulmein, Burma to Falmouth, Cornwall.
Unidentified schooners	Confederate States of America	American Civil War: The schooners were burned by Confederate forces at Fredericksburg, Virginia, before 19 April to prevent their capture by Union forces.
