= Battle of Forts Jackson and St. Philip =

Naval battle of the American Civil War

- Part of the American Civil War
- Attack of the Union fleet, April 24, 1862; Fort Jackson at left and Fort St. Philip is shown at right
Date	April 18–28, 1862
Location	Plaquemines Parish, Louisiana 29°21′27″N 89°27′36″W
Result	Union victory

Belligerents
United States	(Confederate States of America) Confederate States

Commanders and leaders
David G. Farragut	Johnson K. Duncan; John K. Mitchell; John A. Stephenson

Units involved
West Gulf Blockading Squadron	Fort Jackson; Fort St. Philip; River Defense Fleet

Casualties and losses
229 killed and wounded 1 armed steamer lost 1 mortar boat lost	782 killed and wounded All ships lost except 1 gunboat and 1 ram steamer

The battle of Forts Jackson and St. Philip (April 18–28, 1862) was the decisive battle for possession of New Orleans in the American Civil War. The two Confederate forts on the Mississippi River south of the city were attacked by a Union Navy fleet. As long as the forts could keep the Federal forces from moving on the city, it was safe, but if they fell or were bypassed, there were no fall-back positions to impede the Union advance.

New Orleans, the largest city in the Confederacy, was already under threat of attack from its north when David Farragut moved his fleet into the river from the south. The Confederate Navy had previously driven off the Union blockade fleet in the Battle of the Head of Passes the previous October. Although the Union threat from upriver was geographically more remote than that from the Gulf of Mexico, a series of losses in Kentucky and Tennessee had forced the Confederate War and Navy Departments in Richmond to strip the region of much of its defenses. Men and equipment had been withdrawn from the local defenses, so that by mid-April almost nothing remained south of the city except the two forts and an assortment of gunboats of questionable worth. Without reducing the pressure from the north, (Union) President Abraham Lincoln set in motion a combined Army-Navy operation to attack from the south. The Union Army offered 18,000 soldiers, led by the political general Benjamin F. Butler. The Navy contributed a large fraction of its West Gulf Blockading Squadron, which was commanded by Flag Officer David G. Farragut. The squadron was augmented by a semi-autonomous flotilla of mortar schooners and their support vessels under Commander David Dixon Porter.

One of the "bummers", as they were known in the Union Navy. Mortar Schooner of Porter's Bombardment fleet, New Orleans, 1862. A crewman between the masts is leaning on the muzzle of the 13-inch (330 mm) seacoast mortar.(Peabody Museum of Salem)

The expedition assembled at Ship Island in the Gulf. Once they were ready, the naval contingent moved its ships into the river, an operation that was completed on April 14. They were then moved into position near the forts, and on April 18 the mortars opened the battle.

The ensuing battle can be divided into two parts: a mostly-ineffective bombardment of the Confederate-held forts by the raft-mounted mortars, and the successful passage of the forts by much of Farragut's fleet on the night of April 24. During the passage, one Federal warship was lost and three others turned back, while the Confederate gunboats were virtually obliterated. The subsequent capture of the city, achieved with no further significant opposition, was a serious, even fatal, blow from which the Confederacy never recovered. The forts remained after the fleet had passed, but the demoralized enlisted men in Fort Jackson mutinied and forced their surrender.

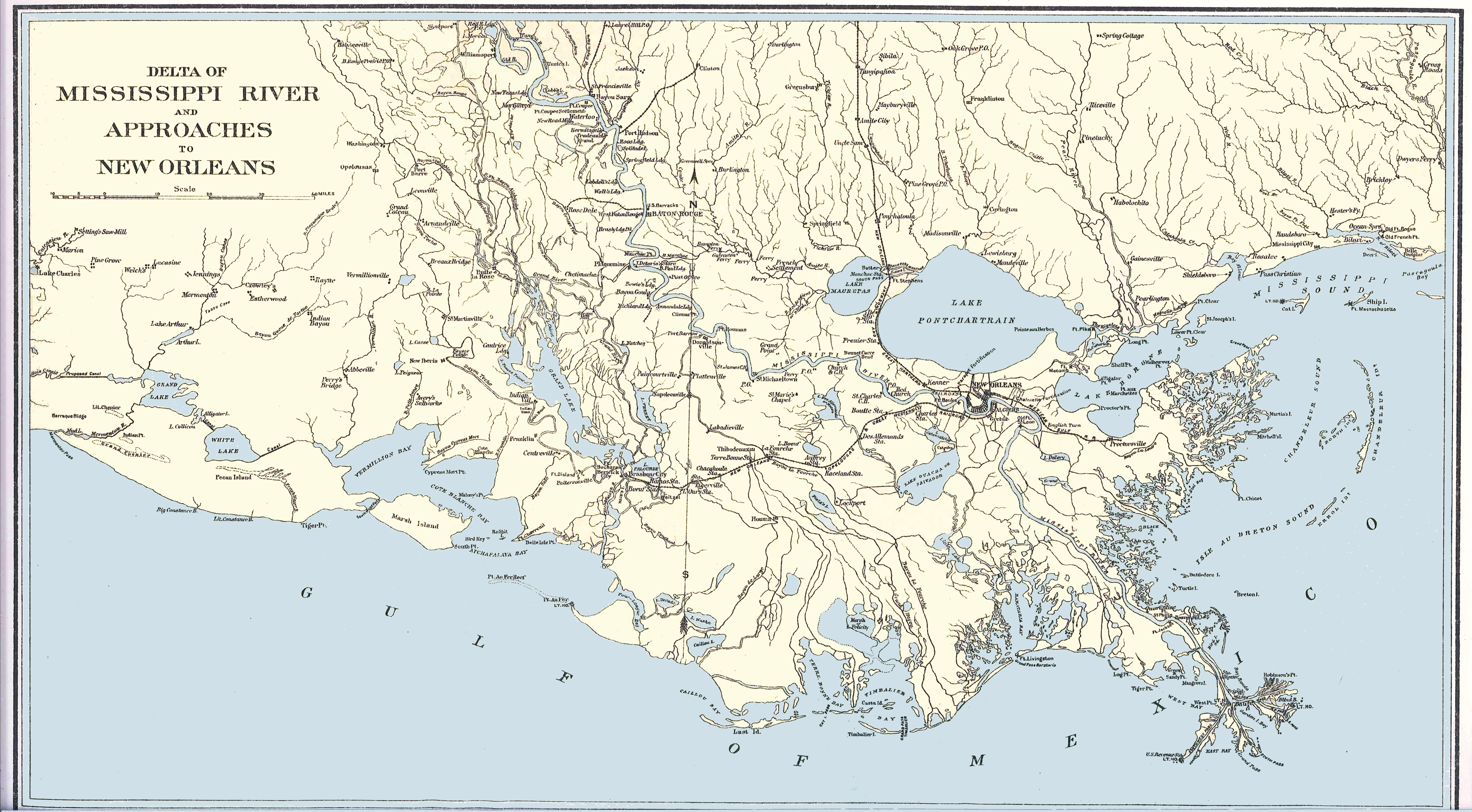
Map depicting the delta of the Mississippi River and approaches to New Orleans printed by the Government printing office in 1904 as part of the Official Records of the Union and Confederate Navies

== Background ==
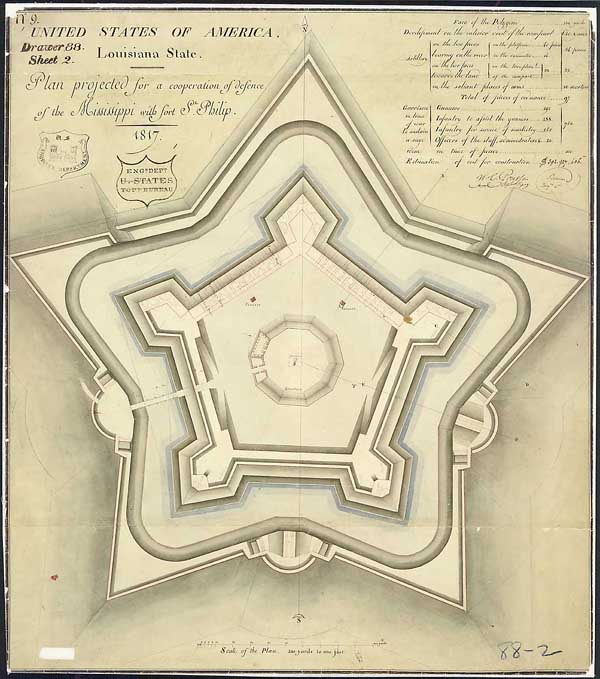
An 1817 plan for the fort that would become Fort Jackson in support of Fort St. Philip

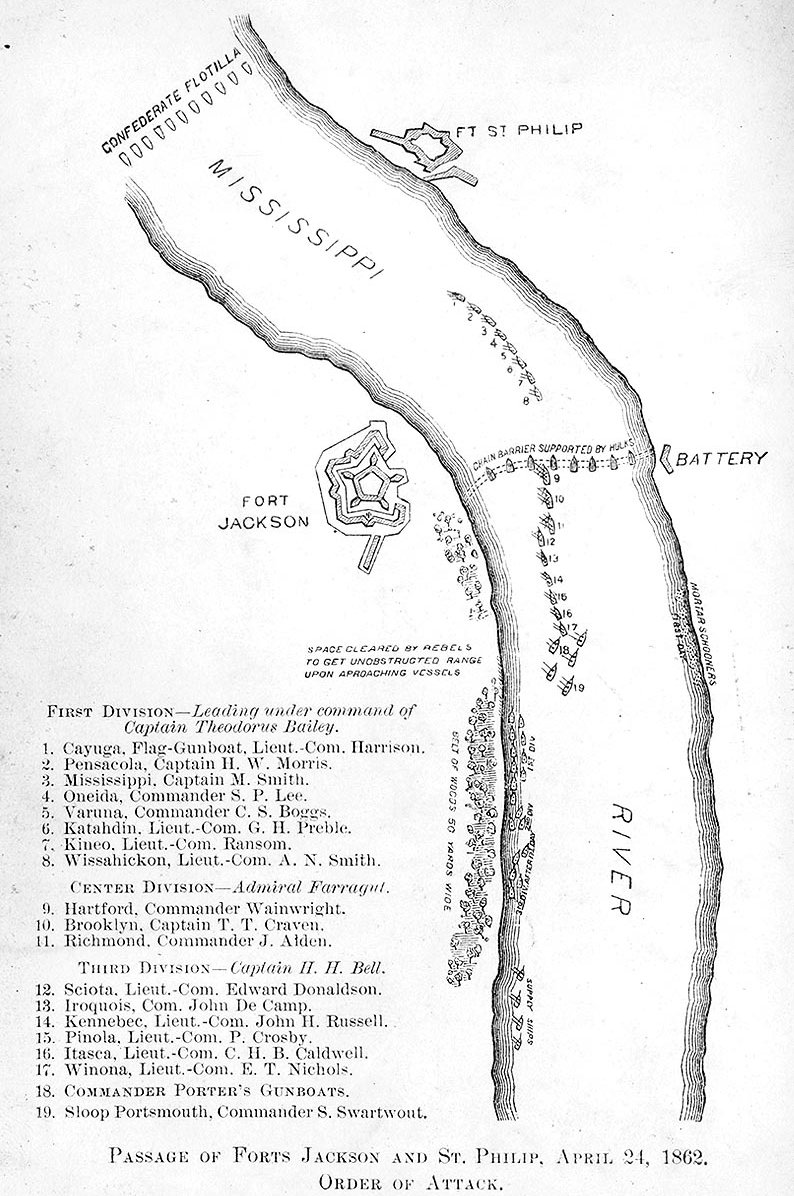
Map of Forts Jackson and St. Philip

Fort Jackson and Fort St. Philip were a pair of closely associated forts on the Mississippi River. They were sited some 40 kilometers (25 mi) above Head of Passes, where the river divides before it finally enters the Gulf of Mexico, or about 120 kilometers (75 mi) downstream from New Orleans. Fort Jackson was on the right (generally west, but here south) bank, while Fort St. Philip was on the left (here, north) bank of the river. Because of the path of the river, Fort Jackson was actually somewhat east of Fort St. Philip. Designed for defense against invasion in the days of sail, the two forts were sited near a bend in the river that would force ships to slow down in passing, so they would be nearly stationary targets under the 177 guns of the forts that bore on the channel.

=== Union preparations ===
Although land-based forts had long been considered to be invulnerable to attack by naval guns, some weaknesses had been exposed in the Battle of Port Royal, South Carolina, on November 7, 1861. Following that battle, (Union) Assistant Secretary of the Navy Gustavus V. Fox began to press for expanded use of the United States Navy in attacking coastal Confederate positions. He particularly emphasized the desirability of assaulting New Orleans, the largest city in the Confederacy, from the Gulf. Fox proposed that the two forts could be weakened if not completely destroyed by a mortar barrage, and a relatively small Army force then could assault the weakened forts. Following the reduction of the forts, or even during the army assault, a fleet could steam past them and attack New Orleans directly.

At first, the Army, in the person of General-in-Chief George B. McClellan, opposed the plan. The contingent of 30,000 to 50,000 troops that McClellan considered the minimum needed for success would be a diversion from other Army operations, particularly the Peninsula Campaign against Richmond, Virginia, that he was directing at that time. Army opposition was negated, however, when (Union) Secretary of the Navy Gideon Welles coopted the political general Benjamin F. Butler by allowing the expedition to proceed under Butler's name. With Butler's support, Welles was able to persuade President Abraham Lincoln to order the campaign forward. On February 23, 1862, Butler was informed that he was in charge of the land forces "destined to cooperate with the Navy in the attack on New Orleans." The number of troops at his disposal was whittled down appreciably from McClellan's original estimate, to only 18,000.

An organizational change in the Navy had to be made before planning for the campaign could proceed. On December 23, 1861, the Gulf Blockading Squadron was divided into the East Gulf and West Gulf Squadrons. To command the West Gulf Blockading Squadron, Secretary Welles selected Captain David Glasgow Farragut. The new commander arrived at Ship Island, in the Gulf of Mexico, on February 20, 1862; this can be taken as the starting date for the campaign.

Farragut had two problems to deal with in addition to any posed by the Confederates. The first, dealing with Butler and his army, was handled by simply ignoring him; the Army took no further part in his plans. The second was not so easily dismissed; part of Farragut's fleet was a semi-autonomous group of mortar schooners, headed by his foster brother David D. Porter. Porter was a master of intrigue who had the ear of Assistant Secretary Fox, and Farragut had to let the mortars be tried, despite his strong personal belief that they would prove worthless.

In mid-March, Farragut began moving his ships across the bar at the mouth of the river. This was not without incident; the depth of water was found to be only 15 feet (4.6 meters) instead of the 18 feet (5.5 meters) that was expected. At least one ship that the Administration wanted in the expedition, USS Colorado, drew too much to get across. To Farragut, the most serious problem presented by the failed effort to bring Colorado into the river was not the reduction in the force he had available, but rather the lost time. With Colorado subtracted, the fleet inside the bar included six ships and twelve gunboats.

After the warships of the squadron were safely in the river, Porter's 26 mortar schooners and associated vessels were brought in with no problems, beginning on March 18. In the next month, Farragut had to gauge the strength of the forts, find the range of their guns, determine the nature of other obstructions in the channel, place the mortar boats where they would be most effective, and put his warships in battle condition. Working under the intermittent fire of the forts and Confederate gunboats, men of the United States Coast Survey who had been assigned to the Navy went ashore and surveyed the forts from a distance, placing buoys in the river channel to mark where the gunboats should be anchored. On April 18, the preliminaries were completed.

==== Union chain of command ====
In the final days of preparation for his ships to run past the forts, Farragut organized his fleet, dividing it into three sections. (This would not have been at all exceptional in the Royal Navy, where the division of the fleet into the van, main fleet, and the rear was the usual practice, but the United States Navy had not used full fleets before the Civil War.) Command of the first division of gunboats was given to Captain Theodorus Bailey, who was also appointed second in overall command, to take over if Farragut himself were to become incapacitated. Command of the second division of gunboats was given to Captain Henry H. Bell. Farragut retained divisional command of the ships for himself.

=== Confederate preparations ===
From the beginning, plans of the Confederate War Department (Secretary of War Judah P. Benjamin at first, later George W. Randolph) in Richmond for defense of New Orleans were distorted by the belief that the primary threat to the city came from the north. Reflecting that belief, much of the material intended to protect the city was sent to strongpoints on the Mississippi, such as Island Number 10, Fort Pillow, and Memphis. The immediate vicinity of the city was actually weakened as guns were withdrawn for use in distant campaigns, as for example that leading to the Battle of Shiloh. The region was also stripped of men of military age. Confederate Major General Mansfield Lovell, commander of Department No. 1, put much more credence in the buildup in the Gulf than did his distant superiors. Flag Officer George N. Hollins, CSN, in charge of the Confederate naval forces on the Mississippi at the time, personally agreed with Lovell, but his orders did not permit him to act on his beliefs. Fort Jackson and Fort St. Philip were under the local command of Brigadier General Johnson K. Duncan. The average quality of the soldiers in the garrison was probably not as high as Lovell and Duncan would have liked; the most militant had been drawn off for other fields, leaving the irresolute and the unfit. Because New Orleans was something of an international city, the ranks contained a greater proportion of foreign-born soldiers than most units of the Confederate Army. Nevertheless, they could be expected to perform their duty, even if they would not make extraordinary exertions.

The forts around the city were supplemented by two defensive chains stretched across the river to prevent passage. (The chains were sometimes referred to as either 'rafts' or 'booms' in the reports.) One chain was placed above the city, and had no effect on the battle. The other was placed just below the forts, where enemy vessels trying to break it would come under their fire. This barrier was much more important than its counterpart. Originally put in place soon after Lovell took command of the department, it broke under the weight of debris washed down the river in the spring floods. It was repaired, but Lovell did not consider the replacement as good as the original.

Additional defense was provided by several ships and boats that were grouped into three separate organizations, with no common command. The largest of these (by firepower) was a contingent of the Confederate States Navy: three ironclads, CSS Manassas, Louisiana, and Mississippi; two more traditional warships, converted from merchantmen, CSS McRae and Jackson, and several unarmed support craft. The state of Louisiana furnished two ships of the Louisiana Provisional Navy, General Quitman and Governor Moore. Last were six cottonclad rams of the River Defense Fleet, nominally a part of the Confederate States Army but commanded by civilian captains and with mostly civilian crews: Warrior, Stonewall Jackson, Defiance, Resolute, General Lovell, and General Breckinridge (also known as R. J. Breckinridge). Also present were several tugs and unarmored harbor craft, of which two, Belle Algerine and Mosher, must be mentioned for the parts they played in the battle.

==== Confederate naval command ====
With three separate organizations in the confined waters of the lower Mississippi, the fleet command situation was already bad enough, but it began to deteriorate further when the buildup of Farragut's fleet in the lower river became apparent. Flag Officer Hollins was at this time near Memphis, which represented the then-northernmost holdings of the Confederacy on the river, and the Confederate War Department insisted that no effort should be spared to maintain possession. Hollins was sure that the threat from the Gulf was much more severe than Richmond thought, so he was prepared to listen when General Lovell pleaded for him to come down to New Orleans to help in its defense. When there, he sent a telegram to Richmond seeking permission to attack Farragut's ships while they were still being lightened to be brought in across the bar. His pleas were so insistent that they virtually amounted to insubordination. Hollins was called to Richmond, ostensibly to serve on an examination board, but in effect to be removed from active service. By default, command of the Confederate Navy vessels in the vicinity of New Orleans fell on the shoulders of Commander William C. Whittle, up to that time commandant of the navy yard there. Whittle did not consider himself able to handle all of his new duties, so on April 18 he passed command of CSS McRae, Jackson, and Manassas, together with their support vessels, to his executive officer, Commander John K. Mitchell. These were all the Confederate Naval vessels afloat at the time; Louisiana and Mississippi had not yet been launched, and were explicitly not controlled by Whittle or Mitchell. Later, when Louisiana was launched but before she was completed, she joined the others in Mitchell's domain.

General Lovell tried to reduce command confusion by ordering that all vessels afloat should likewise take orders from Commander Mitchell. However, Captain John A. Stephenson, leading the River Defense Fleet, refused to accept Navy orders. He was able to get away with this act of seeming mutiny because the relation of his fleet to the Army was contractual rather than military.

== Battle ==
=== First phase: the bombardment, April 18 through 23 ===
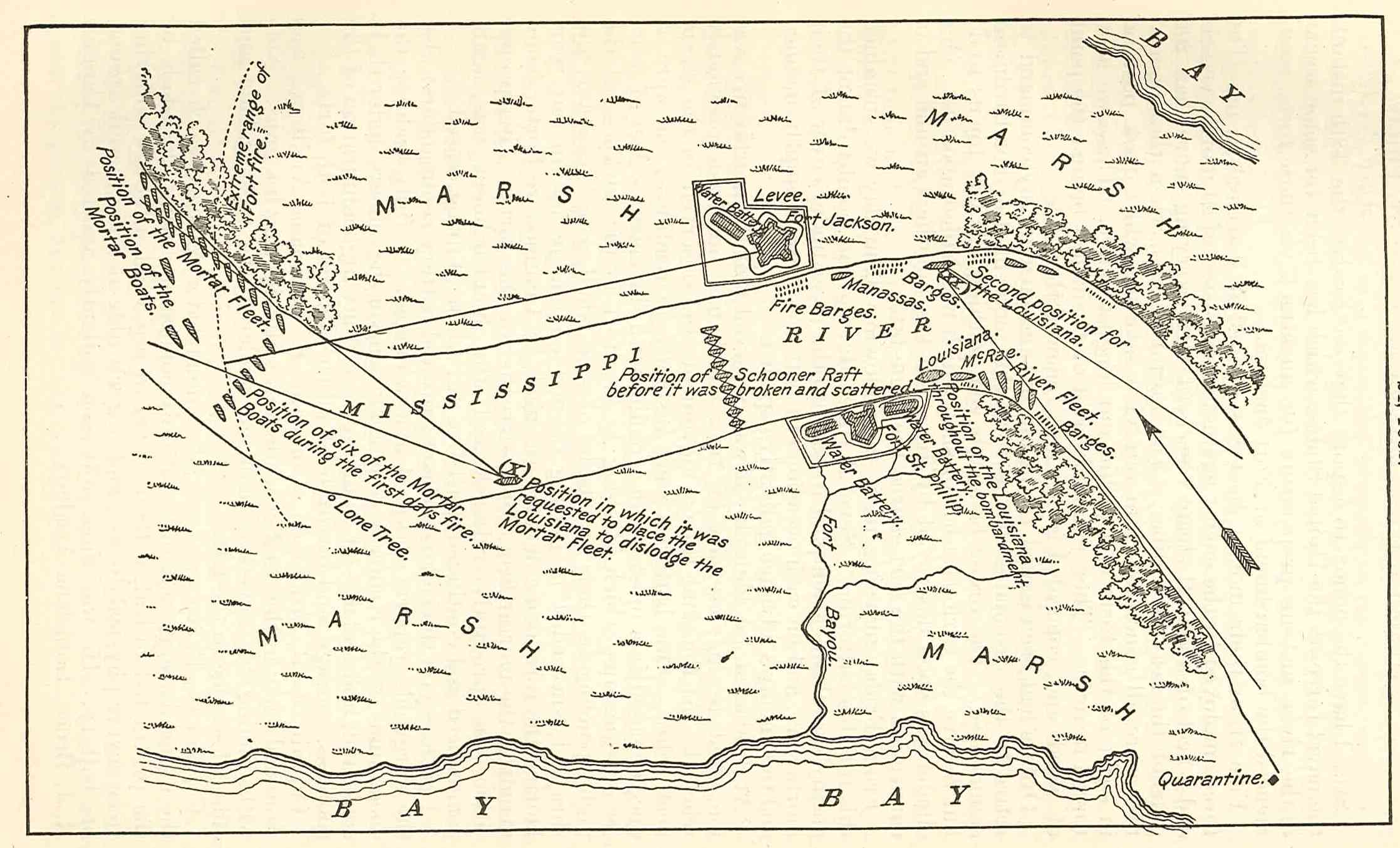
Map of the positions of Porter's mortar fleet and recommended positions of the CSS Louisiana (X) & (XX), April 16 to 24, 1862

Porter's 21 mortar schooners were in place on April 18. They were located close to the river banks downstream from the barrier chain, which was still in place. Their tops were covered with bushes for camouflage; though this was soon stripped away by the shock of the mortar fire. Commencing in the early morning, the mortars kept up a steady fire all day. Porter had specified a rate of a shot every ten minutes from each mortar, which would have kept a shot in the air throughout the bombardment. While the rate could not be maintained, more than 1400 shots were fired on the first day. The rate of fire was somewhat less on subsequent days.

The fuses in the shells proved to be unreliable, and many of the shells exploded prematurely. To eliminate the problem, on the second and subsequent days of the bombardment, Porter ordered that all fuses should be cut to full length. While the shells hit the ground before exploding, they sank into the soft earth, muffling the effects of the blast.

Probably because it was nearer to the Federal mortars, Fort Jackson suffered more damage than did Fort St. Philip, but even there it was minimal. Only seven pieces of artillery were disabled, and only two men were killed during the bombardment. Return fire on Porter's vessels was about equally ineffective; one schooner (USS Maria J. Carlton) was sunk, and one man was killed by enemy action (another man died when he fell from the rigging.)

Porter had rashly promised Welles and Fox that the mortar fleet would reduce both forts to rubble in 48 hours. Though this did not happen, and the immediate fighting capacity of the forts were only marginally affected, a survey of Fort Jackson after the battle did note the following damage:

Main deck of Union Navy mortar schooner showing mounting of 13-inch (330 mm) seacoast mortar and crew. (U.S. Army Military History Institute.)

All the scows and boats near the fort except three small ones were sunk. The drawbridge, hot shot furnaces and fresh water cisterns were destroyed. The floors of the casemates were flooded, the levee having been broken. All the platforms for pitching tents on were destroyed by fire or shells. All the casemates were cracked (the roof in some places being entirely broken through) and masses of brick dislodged in numerous instances. The outer walls of the fort were cracked from top to bottom admitting daylight freely. Four guns were dismounted, eleven carriages and thirty beds and traverses injured. 1113 mortar shells and 87 round shot were counted in the solid ground of the fort and levees. 3339 mortar shells are computed to have fallen in the ditches and overflowed parts of the defenses. 1080 shells exploded in the air over the fort. 7500 bombs were fired.

Brigadier General Duncan, CSA, commanding the forts, described damage to Fort Jackson on the first day, April 18:

The quarters in the bastions were fired and burned down early in the day, as well as the quarters immediately without the fort. The citadel was set on fire and extinguished several times during the first part of the day, but later it became impossible to put out the flames, so that when the enemy ceased firing it was one burning mass, greatly endangering the magazines, which at one time were reported to be on fire. Many of the men and most of the officers lost their bedding and clothing by these fires, which greatly added to the discomforts of the overflow. The mortar fire was accurate and terrible, many of the shells falling everywhere within the fort and disabling some of our best guns.

General Duncan recorded 2,997 mortar shells fired on that day.

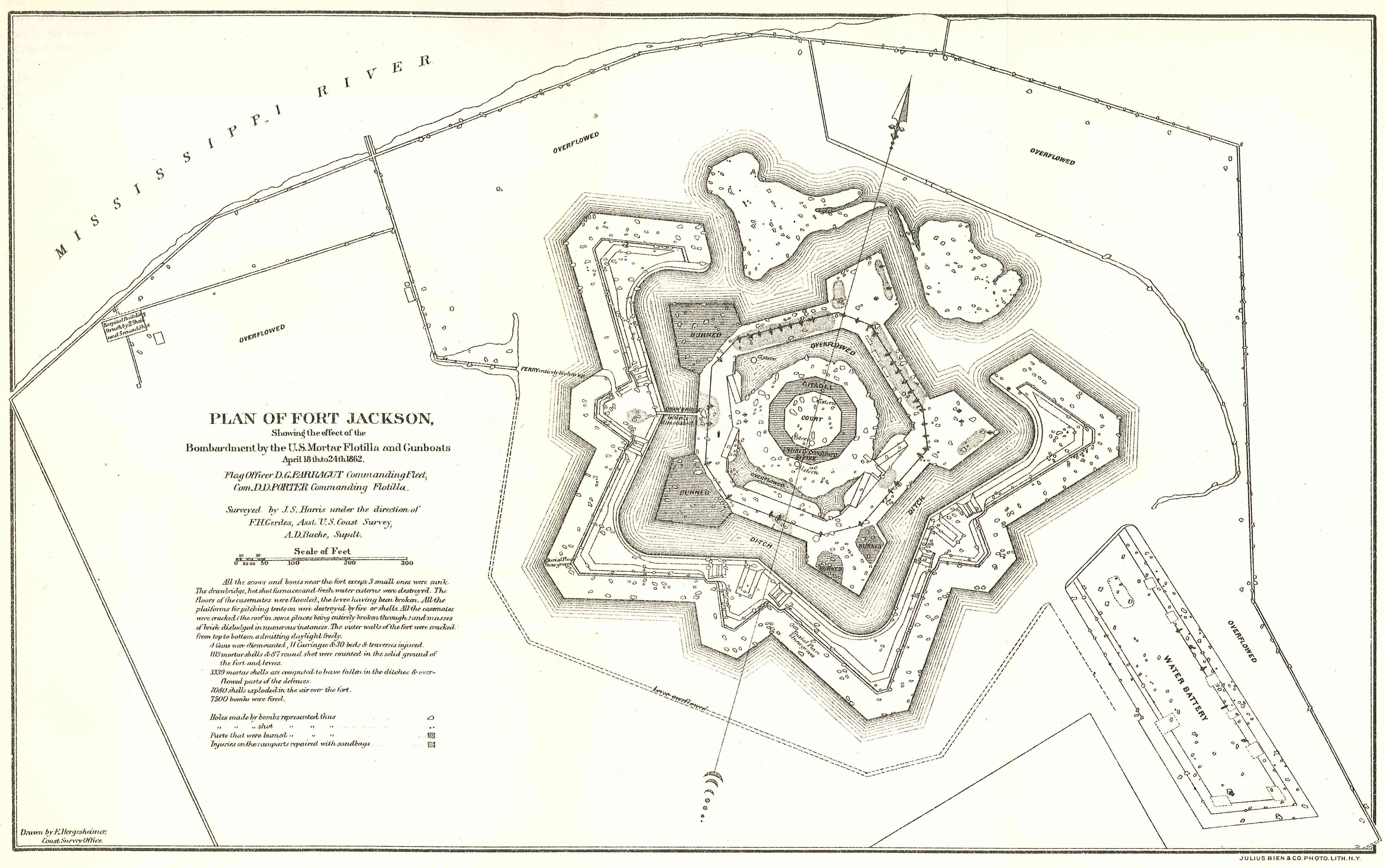
Plan of Fort Jackson showing damage done by the mortar bombardment and gunboats from April 18 to 24, 1862

This kind of damage made life in Fort Jackson a misery when combined with constant flooding from high water within the fort. The crew could be safe from mortar fragments and falling debris only within the dank and partially flooded casemates. Lack of shelter, food, blankets, sleeping quarters, drinkable water, along with the depressing effects of days of heavy, unanswered shelling were hard to bear. When combined with sickness and the ever-present corrosive fear, conditions were definitely a drain on morale. These factors contributed to the mutiny of the Fort Jackson garrison on April 28. This mutiny began a subsequent collapse of resistance downriver from the city. Fort St. Phillips was also surrendered, the CSS Louisiana blown up and even the Confederate fleet on Lake Pontchartrain was destroyed to avoid capture. The general collapse of morale began with the mutiny and greatly simplified the occupation of New Orleans by the Union navy.

The Confederate authorities had long believed that the Navy's ironclad ships, particularly CSS Louisiana, would render the river impregnable against assaults such as they were now experiencing. Although Louisiana was not yet finished, Generals Lovell and Duncan pressed Commodore Whittle to hurry the preparation. Acceding to their wishes against his better judgment, Whittle had the ship launched prematurely and added to Commander Mitchell's fleet even while workmen were still fitting her out. On the second day of the bombardment, she was towed (too late, her owners found that her engines were not strong enough to enable her to buck the current) to a position on the left bank, upstream from Fort St. Philip, where she became in effect a floating battery. Mitchell would not move her closer because her armor would not protect her from the plunging shot of Porter's mortars. However, because her guns could not be elevated, they could not be brought to bear on the enemy so long as they remained below the forts.

After several days of bombardment, the return fire from the forts showed no signs of slackening, so Farragut began to execute his own plan. On April 20, he ordered three of his gunboats, Kineo, Itasca, and Pinola, to break the chain blocking the river. Although they did not succeed in removing it altogether, they were able to open a gap large enough for the flag officer's purposes.

For various reasons, Farragut was not able to make his attack until the early morning of April 24.

=== Second phase: passing the forts ===
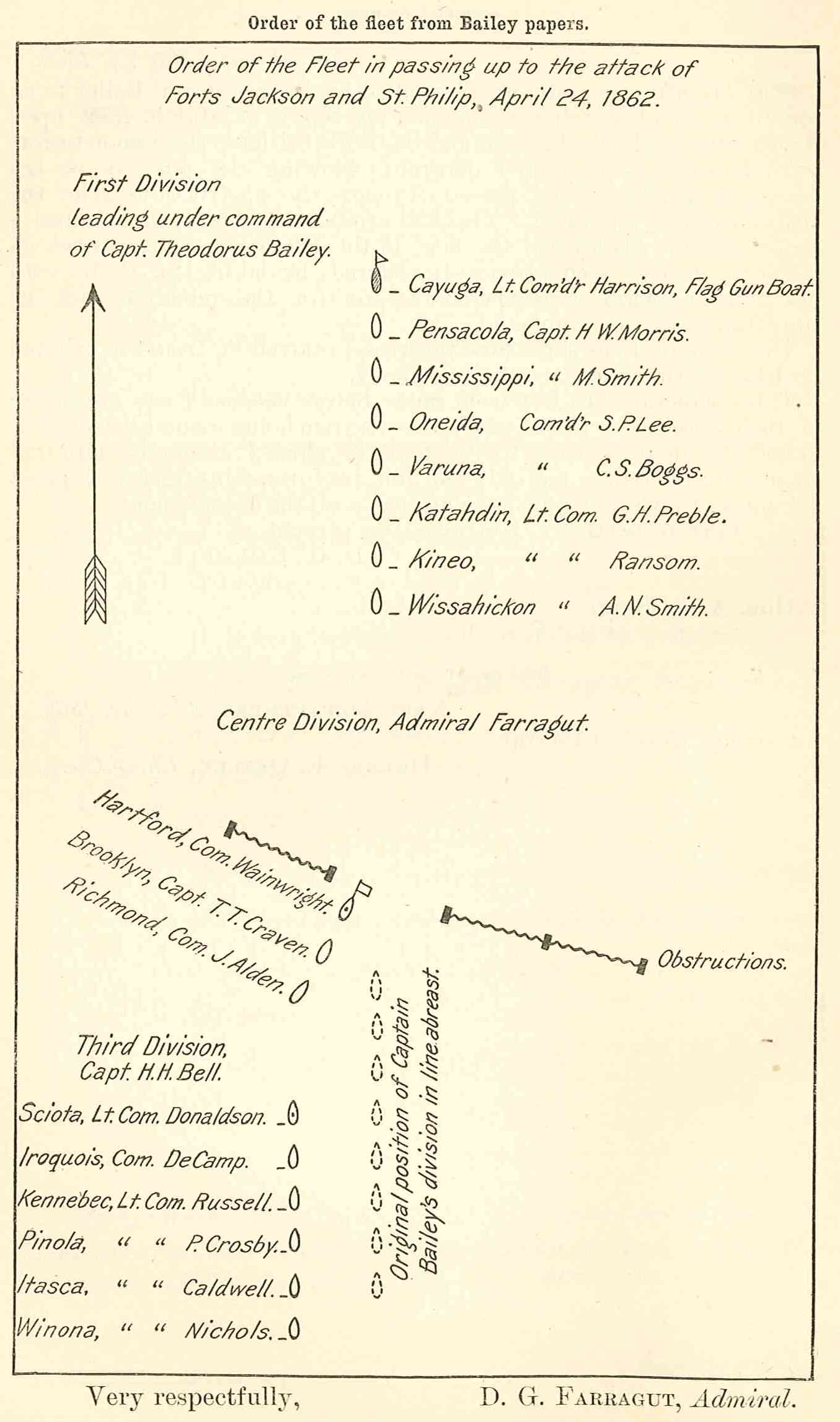
The order of the advance of the Union Fleet past the forts from the Bailey Papers, endorsed by Admiral D.G. Farragut

Having resolved to pass the forts, Farragut somewhat modified his fleet arrangements by adding two ships to Captain Bailey's first section of gunboats, thereby eliminating one of his ship sections. After the alteration, the fleet disposition was as follows:

First section, Captain Theodorus Bailey: USS Cayuga, Pensacola (ship), USS Mississippi, Oneida, Varuna, Katahdin, Kineo, and Wissahickon.

Second section (ships), Flag Officer Farragut: USS Hartford, Brooklyn, and Richmond.

Third section, Captain Henry H. Bell: USS Sciota, Iroquois, Kennebec, Pinola, Itasca, and Winona.

The ship Portsmouth was left to protect the mortar schooners.

When passing the forts, the fleet was to form two columns. The starboard column would fire on Fort St. Philip, while the port column would fire on Fort Jackson. They were not to stop and slug it out with the forts, however, but to pass by as quickly as possible. Farragut hoped that the combination of darkness and smoke would obscure the aim of the gunners in the forts, and his vessels could pass by relatively unscathed.

At approximately 03:00 on April 24, the fleet got under way and headed for the gap in the chain that had blocked the channel. Soon after passing that obstacle, they were spotted by men in the forts, which promptly opened up with all their available firepower. As Farragut had hoped, however, their aim was poor, and his fleet suffered little significant damage. His own gunners' aim was no better, of course, and the forts likewise sustained little damage. The last three gunboats in the column turned back. Itasca was disabled by a shot in her boilers and drifted out of action; the others (Pinola and Winona) turned back because dawn was breaking and not because of Rebel guns.

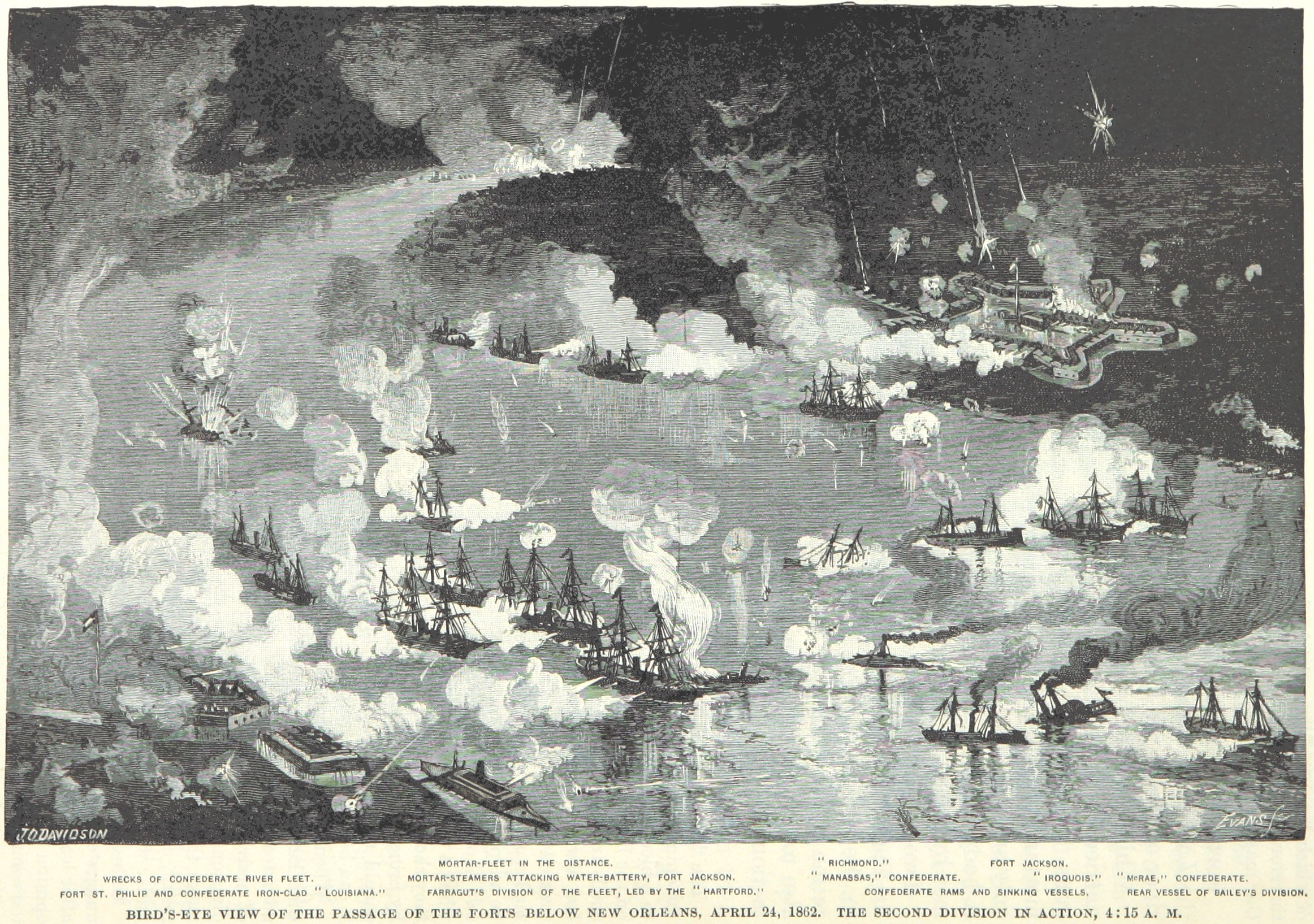
Admiral Farragut's second division passes the forts.

The Confederate fleet did very little in this stage of the battle. CSS Louisiana was finally able to use her guns, but with little effect. The armored ram CSS Manassas came in early and tried to engage the enemy, but the gunners in the forts made no distinction between Manassas and members of the Federal fleet, firing on friend and foe indiscriminately. Her captain, Lieutenant Commander Alexander F. Warley, therefore took his vessel back up the river, to attack when he would be fired upon by only the Union fleet.

Once past the forts, the head of the Federal column came under attack by some of the Confederate ships, while some of the vessels further back in the column were still under the fire of the forts. Because of their fragmented command structure, the Confederate ships did not coordinate their movements, so the battle degenerated into a jumble of individual ship-on-ship engagements.

Manassas rammed both USS Mississippi and USS Brooklyn, but could not disable either. As dawn broke, she found herself caught between two Union ships and was able to attack neither, so Captain Warley ordered her run ashore. The crew abandoned the vessel and set her afire. Later, she floated free from the bank, still afire, and finally sank in view of Porter's mortar schooners.

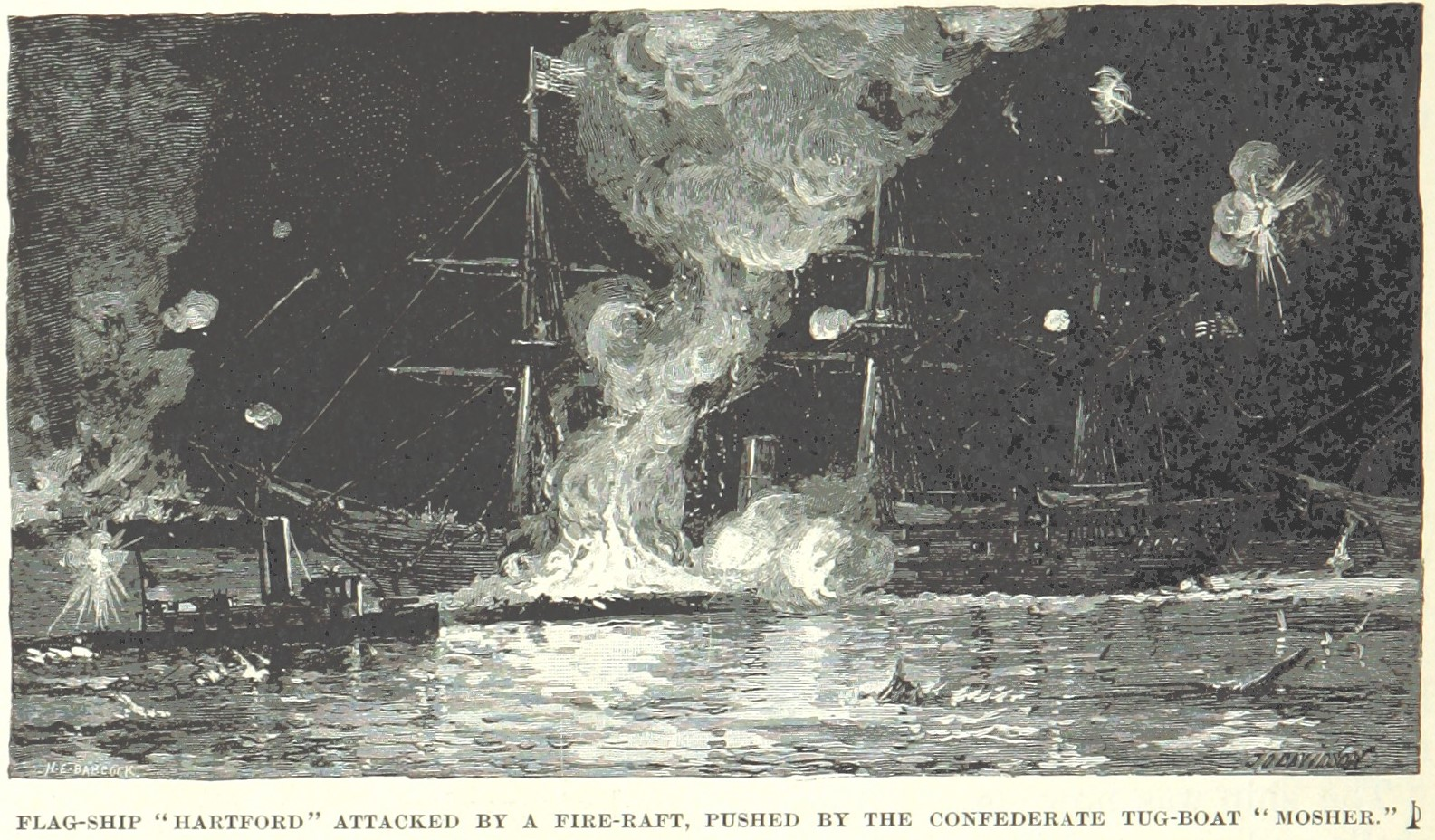
Mosher pushes the fire raft against Hartford.

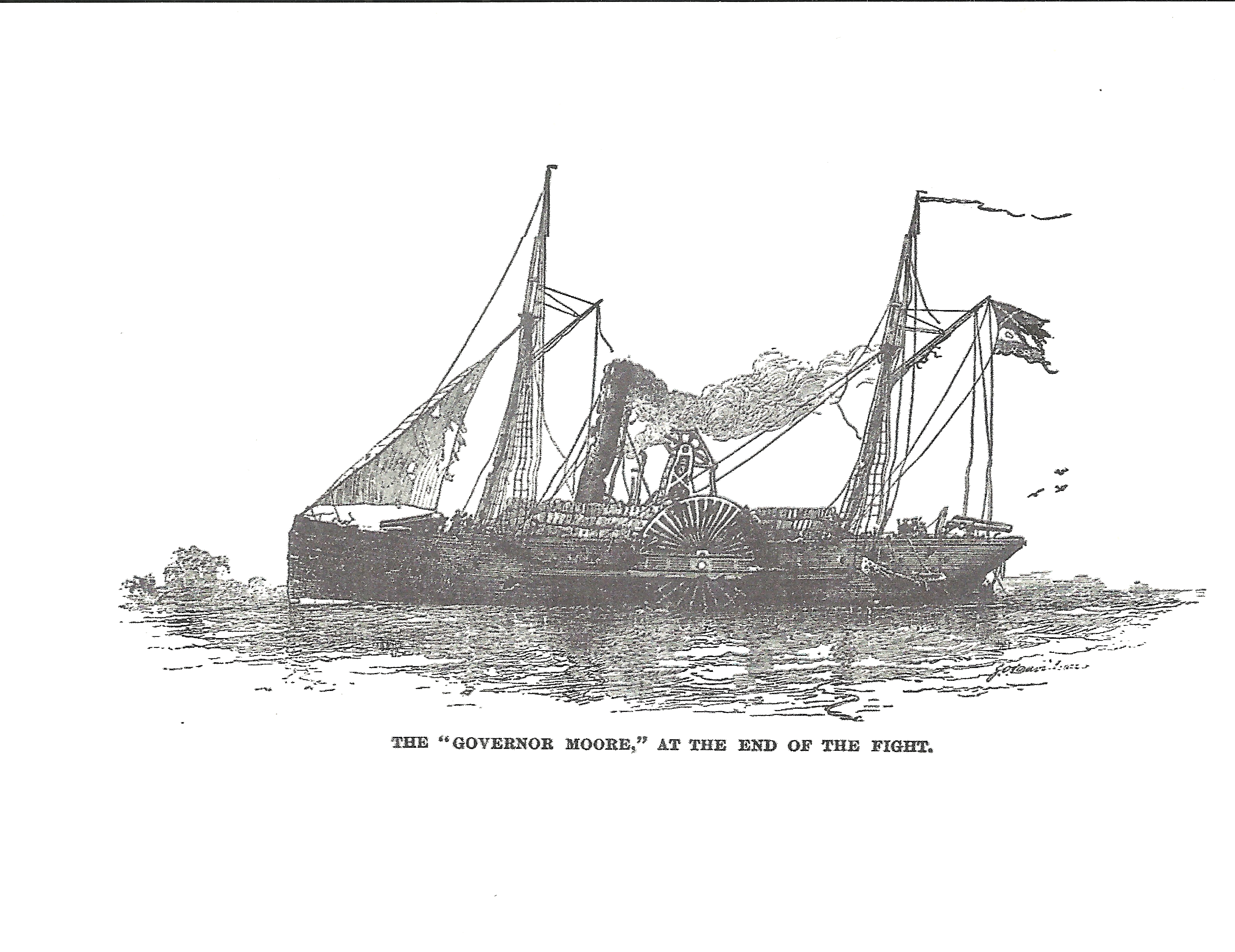
CSS Governor Moore

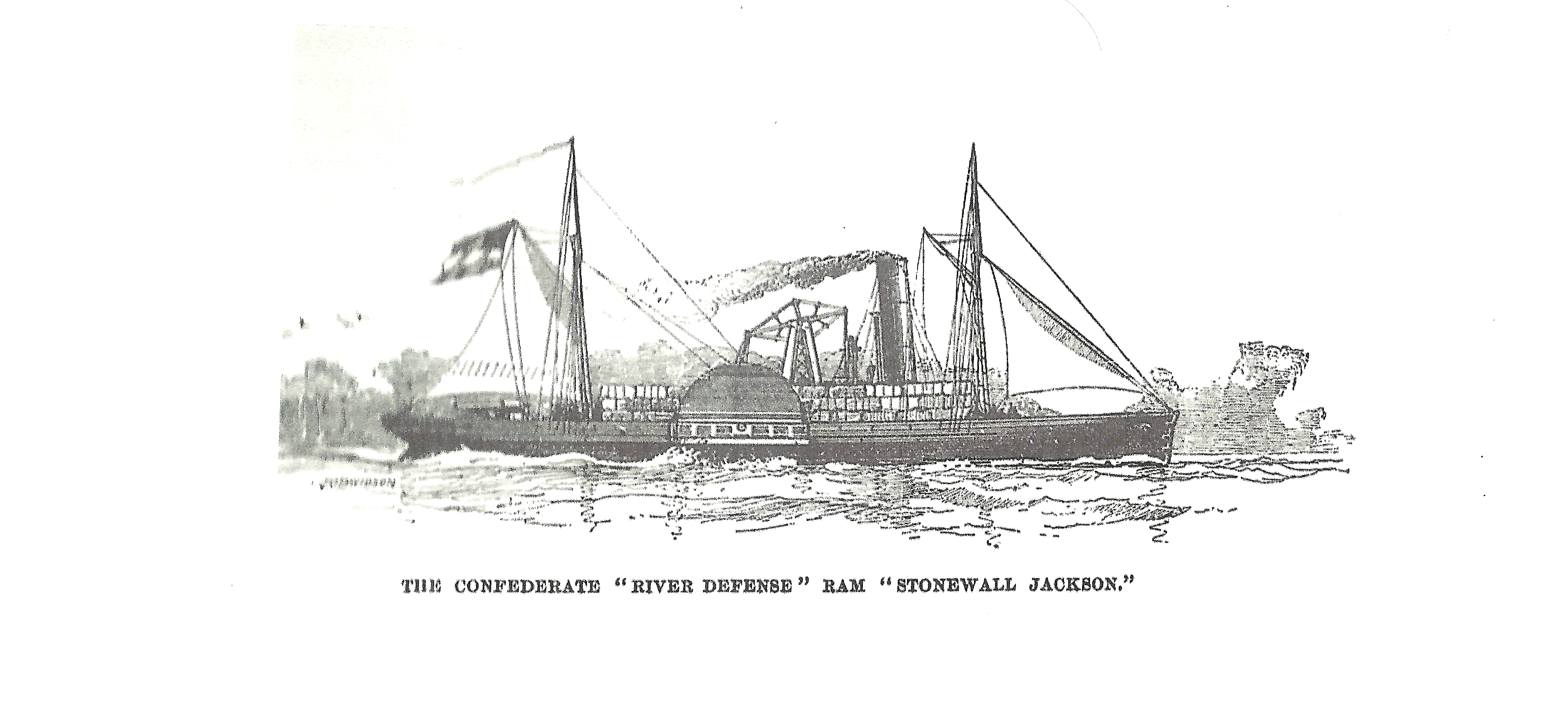
CSS Stonewall Jackson

The tug CSS Mosher pushed a fire raft against the flagship USS Hartford; for her daring she received a broadside from the latter that sent her to the bottom. Hartford, while attempting to avoid the fire raft, ran ashore not far upstream from Fort St. Philip. Although she was then within range of the guns of the fort, they could not be brought to bear, so the flagship was able to extinguish the flames and work her way off the bank with little significant damage.

In getting under way, Governor Moore was fouled by and ran into the Confederate tug Belle Algerine, sinking her. Attacking the Union fleet, she found USS Varuna ahead of the rest of the fleet. A long chase ensued, both ships firing on each other as Governor Moore pursued the Federal vessel. Despite losing a large part of her crew during the chase, she was eventually able to ram Varuna. The cottonclad ram Stonewall Jackson, of the River Defense Fleet, also managed to ram. Varuna was able to reach shallow water near the bank before she sank, the only vessel lost from the attacking fleet. Lieutenant Beverly Kennon, captaining Governor Moore, would have continued the fight, but his steersman had had enough and drove the ship ashore. Kennon, apparently realizing that his steersman was correct and that the ship was unable to do any more, ordered her abandoned and set afire.

CSS McRae engaged several members of the Federal fleet in an uneven contest that saw her captain, Lieutenant Commander Thomas B. Huger, mortally wounded. McRae herself was badly holed, and although she survived the battle, she later sank at her moorings in New Orleans.

None of the rest of the Confederate flotilla did any harm to the Union fleet, and most of them were sunk, either by enemy action or at their own hands. The survivors, in addition to McRae, were CSS Jackson, the ram Defiance, and the transport Diana. Two unarmed tenders were surrendered to the mortar flotilla with the forts. Louisiana also survived the battle, but was scuttled rather than be surrendered.

In summary, during the run of the fleet past the forts, the Union Navy lost one vessel, while the defenders lost twelve.

Historian John D. Winters in The Civil War in Louisiana (1963) noted that with few exceptions the Confederate fleet at New Orleans had "made a sorry showing. Self-destruction, lack of co-operation, cowardice of untrained officers, and the murderous fire of the Federal gunboats reduced the fleet to a demoralized shambles." Historian Allan Nevins argues the Confederate defenses were defective:

Confederate leaders had made a tardy, ill-coordinated effort to muster at the river barrier. Fortunately for the Union, both the naval and military auxiliaries were weak. In all their work of defense the Southerners had been hampered by poverty, disorganization, lack of skilled engineers and craftsmen, friction between State authorities and Richmond, and want of foresight.

== Surrender of New Orleans and the forts ==
The Union fleet faced only token opposition at Chalmette and thereafter had clear sailing to New Orleans. The fourteen vessels remaining arrived there in the afternoon of April 25 and laid the city under their guns. In the meantime, General Lovell had evacuated the troops that had been in the city, so no defense was possible. Panic-stricken citizens broke into stores, burned cotton and other supplies, and destroyed much of the waterfront. The unfinished CSS Mississippi was hastily launched; it was hoped that she could be towed to Memphis, but no towboats could be found, so she was burned by order of her captain. Farragut demanded the surrender of the city. The mayor and city council tried to buck the unpleasant duty up to Lovell, but he passed it back to them. After three days of fruitless negotiations, Farragut sent two officers ashore with a detachment of sailors and marines. They went to the Custom House, where they hauled down the state flag and ran up the United States flag. That signified the official return of the city to the Union.

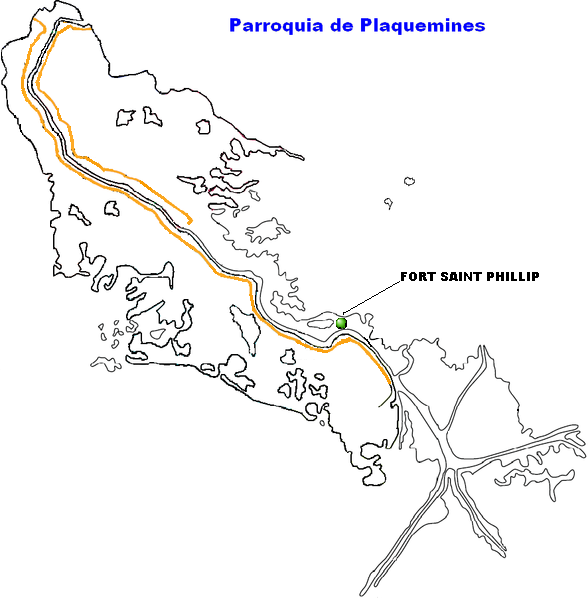
Fort St. Philip along the Mississippi River

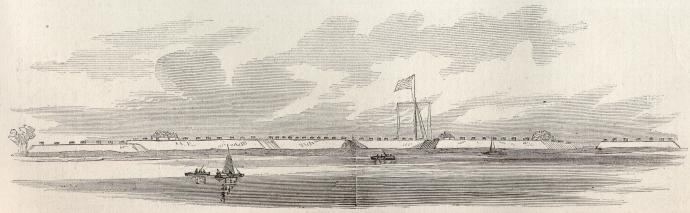
Fort St. Philip in 1862

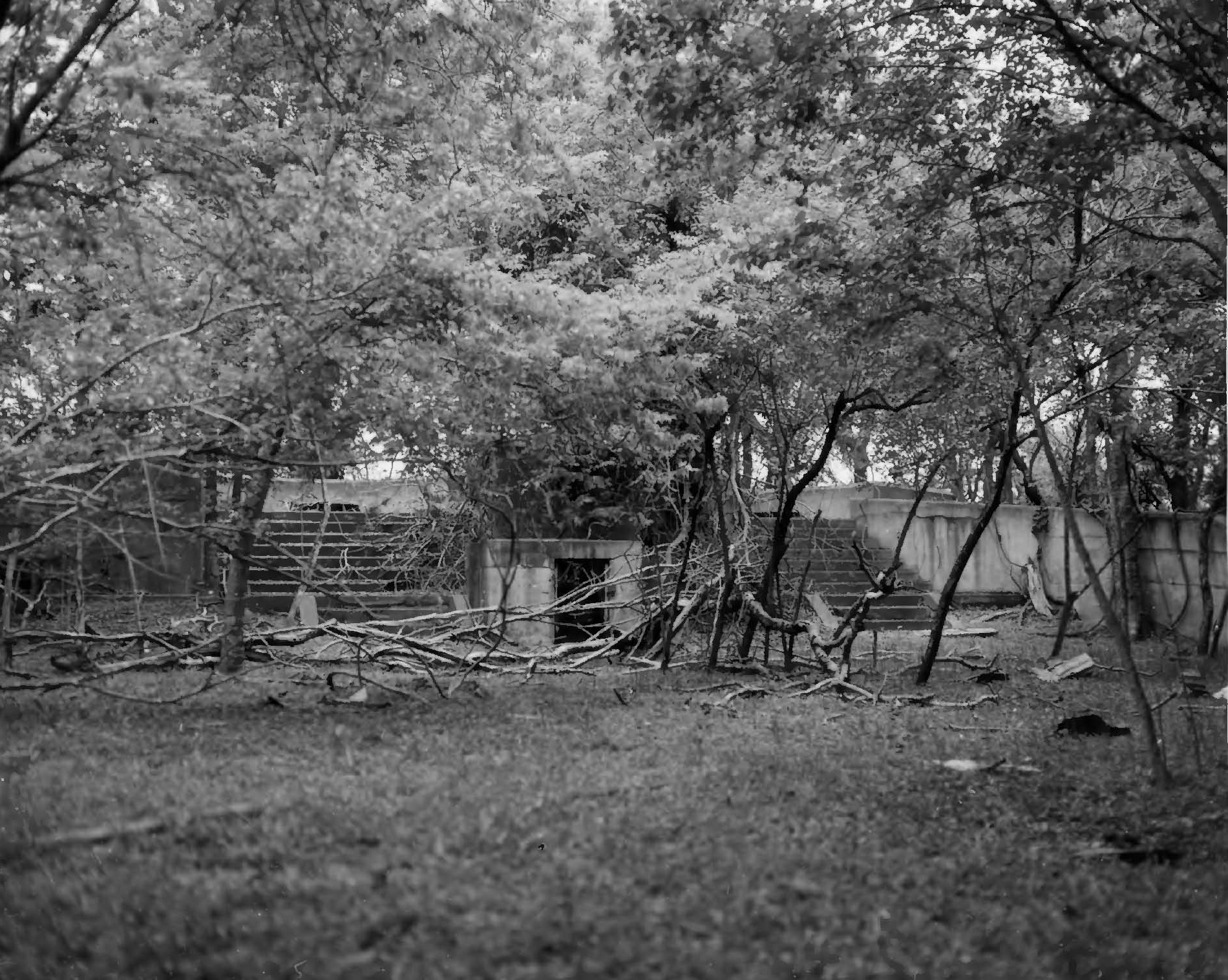
Fort St. Philip 1898

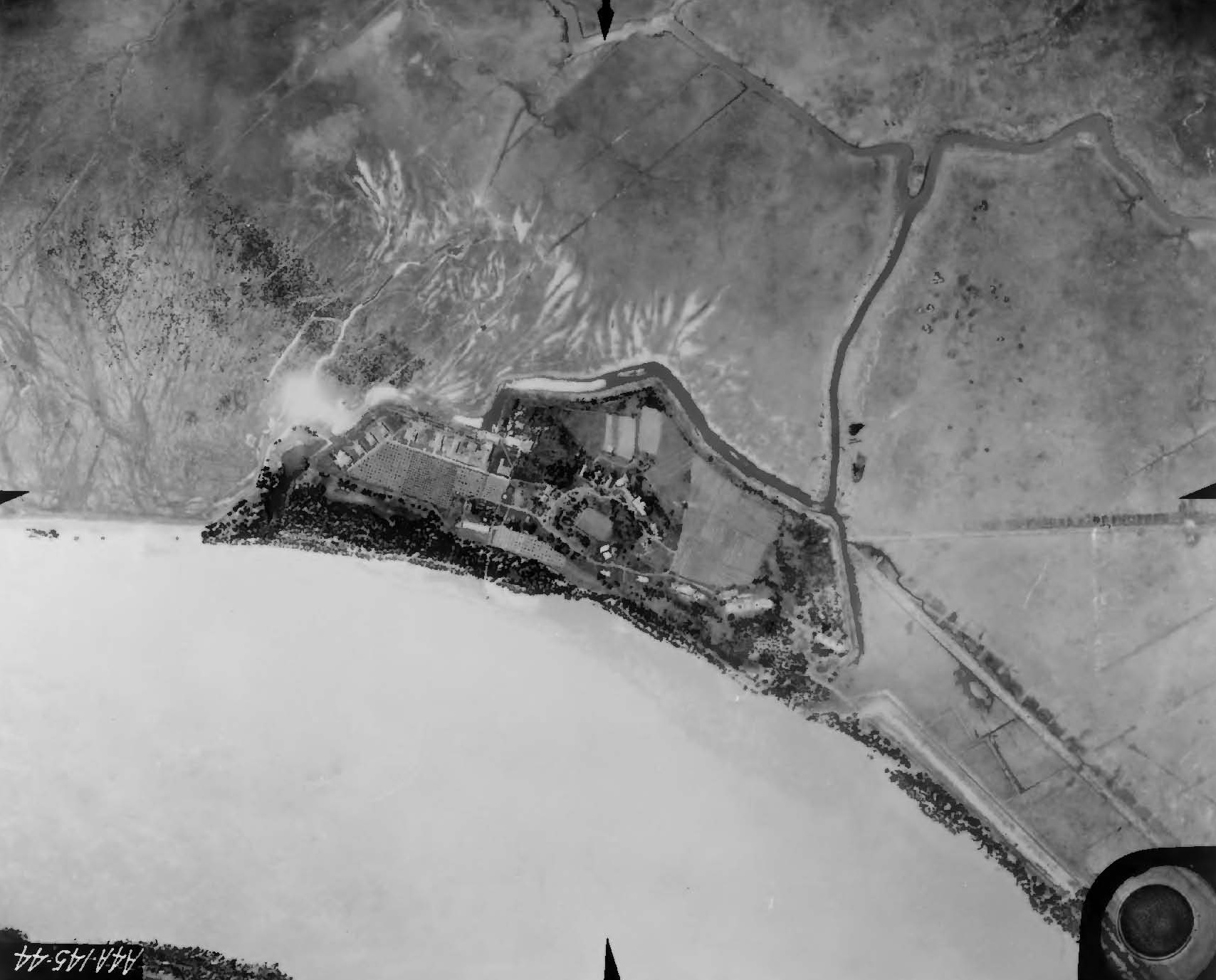
Fort St. Philip from the air in 1935.

Meanwhile, General Butler was preparing his soldiers for an attack on the forts that were now in Farragut's rear. Commodore Porter, now in charge of the flotilla still below the forts, delivered a demand to surrender to the forts, but General Duncan refused. Accordingly, Porter again began to bombard the forts, this time in preparation for Butler's assault. However, on the night of April 29, the enlisted garrison in Fort Jackson mutinied and refused to endure any more. Although Fort St. Philip was not involved in the mutiny, the interdependence of the two forts meant that it was also affected. Unable to continue the battle, Duncan capitulated the next day.

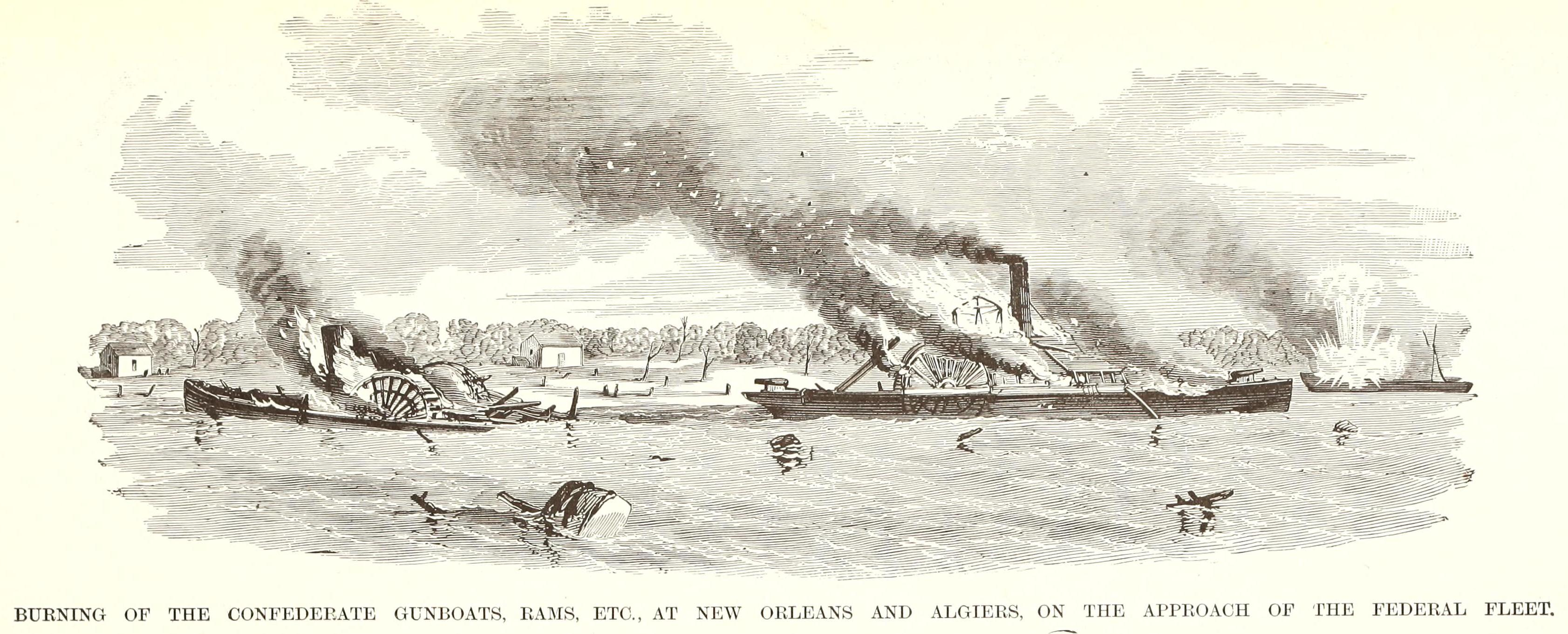
Burning of the Confederate gunboats, rams etc. at New Orleans and Algiers on the approach of the Federal Fleet

The end of CSS Louisiana came at this time. Commander John K. Mitchell, who represented the Confederate States Navy in the vicinity of the forts, was not included in the surrender negotiations. He therefore did not consider it his duty to observe the truce that had been declared, so he ordered Louisiana to be destroyed. Set afire, she soon became undocked and floated down the river. Louisiana blew up as she passed Fort St. Philip; the blast killed one soldier in the fort.

== Aftermath ==
Forts Jackson and St. Philip had been the shell of the Confederate defenses on the lower Mississippi, and nothing now stood between the Gulf and Memphis. After a few days spent repairing battle damage his ships had suffered, Farragut sent expeditions north to demand the surrender of other cities on the river. With no effective means of defense, Baton Rouge and Natchez complied. At Vicksburg, however, the guns of the ships could not reach the Confederate fortifications atop the bluffs, and the small army contingent that was with them could not force the issue. Farragut settled into a siege but was forced to withdraw when falling levels of the river threatened to strand his deep-water ships. Vicksburg would not fall until another year had passed.

The fall of New Orleans as a consequence of the battle may also have swayed European powers, primarily Great Britain and France, not to recognize the Confederacy diplomatically. Confederate agents abroad noted that they were generally received more coolly, if at all, after word of loss of the city reached London and Paris.

== See also ==
- Joseph Smith Harris: (personal account of the bombardment)
- Bibliography of Civil War naval history
- New Orleans in the Civil War

== Bibliography ==
- National Park Service battle description
- Davis, George B., Stephen B. Elkins, and Daniel S. Lamont, Atlas to Accompany the Official Records of the Union and Confederate Armies. US War Department, 1891. Reprint, Arno Press, 1978.
- Official Records of the Union and Confederate Navies in the War of the Rebellion. Series I: 27 volumes. Series II: 3 volumes. Washington: Government Printing Office, 1894–1922.
- War of the Rebellion: A Compilation of the Official Records of the Union and Confederate Armies. Series I: 53 volumes. Series II: 8 volumes. Series III: 5 volumes. Series IV: 4 volumes. Washington: Government Printing Office, 1886–1901.
- Callahan, James Morton, The Diplomatic History of the Southern Confederacy. Johns Hopkins, 1901.
- Catton, Bruce, Terrible Swift Sword: The Centennial History of the Civil War, Volume 2. Doubleday, 1963. ISBN 0-385-02614-5.
- Duffy, James P. Lincoln's Admiral: The Civil War Campaigns of David Farragut. Wiley, 1997. ISBN 0-471-04208-0
- Dufour, Charles L. The Night the War Was Lost. Garden City: Doubleday, 1960. ISBN 0-8032-6599-9 (1994 University of Nebraska Press edition).
- Eicher, David J., The Longest Night: A Military History of the Civil War. Simon & Schuster, 2001. ISBN 0-684-84944-5.
- Hearn, Chester G. The Capture of New Orleans, 1862. Louisiana State University Press, 1995.
- Johnson, Robert Underwood and Clarence Clough Buel, eds., Battles and Leaders of the Civil War. Century, 1894; reprint ed., Castle, n.d.
- Mitchell, John K. "Operations of Confederate States Navy in Defense of New Orleans" (letter). Southern Historical Society Papers, v. 2, pp. 240–244 (1876).
- Simson, Jay W., Naval Strategies of the Civil War: Confederate Innovations and Federal Opportunism. Cumberland House, 2001. ISBN 1-58182-195-6
- Wells, Tom H. The Confederate Navy: A Study in Organization. University of Alabama Press, 1971.
- Winters, John D., The Civil War in Louisiana. Louisiana State University Press, 1963. ISBN 0-8071-1725-0

=== Further reading ===
- Rhodes, James Ford (1917). History of the Civil War
  Macmillan & Co., New York, Boston, London, p. 467, E'Book (Note: Awarded the Pulitzer Prize in History in 1918: Extensive coverage of Naval theater, blockade runners, David Farragut, David Dixon Porter etc)
- Schouler, James (1899). History of the civil war, 1861–1865: being vol. VI of History of the United States of America, under the constitution
  Dodd, Meade & Co., New York, p. 699, E'Book (Note: Extensive coverage of Naval theater, blockade runners, David Farragut, David Dixon Porter, etc)
- Albert Gaius Hills and Gary L. Dyson (ed.), "A Civil War Correspondent in New Orleans, the Journals and Reports of Albert Gaius Hills of the Boston Journal." McFarland and Company, Inc. (2013) ISBN 978-0-7864-7193-5.
