= CSS General Quitman =

Two ships of the Confederate States Navy have been named General Quitman after John A. Quitman:

- CSS General Quitman (transport), a Confederate States transport built c.1859, sank at Morganza, Louisiana on October 23, 1868
- CSS General Quitman (gunboat), a gunboat of Confederate River Defense Fleet, probably built as the Galveston c.1857, burned to prevent capture on April 24, 1862

== See also ==
- River Defense Fleet
