= Johnson K. Duncan =

General of the Confederate States Army during the American Civil War

Johnson Kelly Duncan
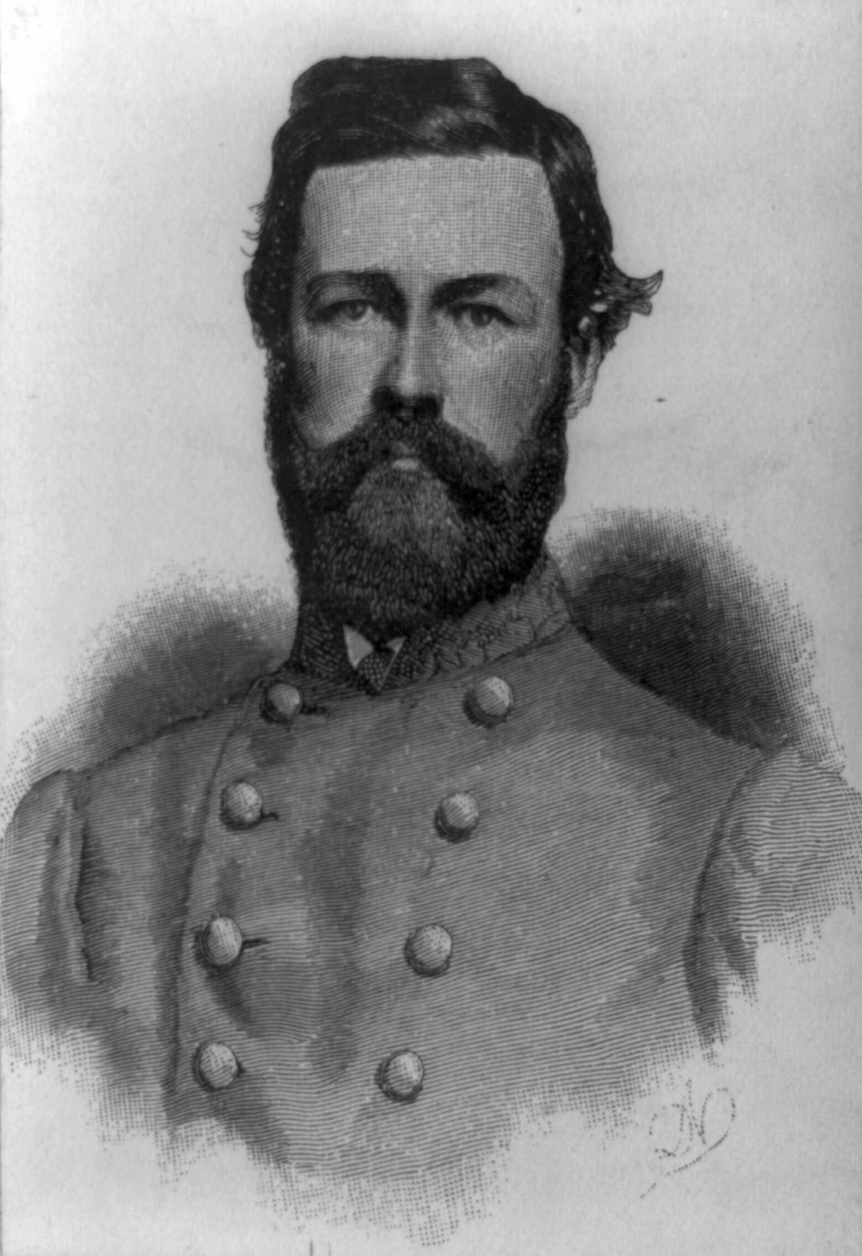
- Born: March 19, 1827; Chanceford Township, Pennsylvania
- Died: December 18, 1862 (aged 35); Knoxville, Tennessee
- Burial place: McGavock Confederate Cemetery
- Alma mater: United States Military Academy
- Spouse: Mary Julia Duncan
- Children: 2
- Military career
- Allegiance: United States; Confederate States
- Branch: United States Army; Confederate States Army
- Service years: 1845–1855 (USA); 1861–1862 (CSA)
- Rank: First Lieutenant (USA); Brigadier General (CSA)
- Conflicts: American Civil War; Battle of Forts Jackson and St. Philip

Johnson Kelly Duncan (March 19, 1827 – December 18, 1862) was one of the few generals in the Confederate States Army (CSA) during the American Civil War who was born and raised in the North. An antebellum officer in the U.S. Army, Duncan commanded the Confederate forts defending New Orleans during the Union Navy's successful attacks that led to the fall of the South's largest city.

== Early life and career ==
Duncan was born and raised in rural Chanceford Township in southeastern York County, Pennsylvania, which borders the broad Susquehanna River. He was appointed to the United States Military Academy on July 1, 1845, and graduated from West Point in June 1849. A good student, he ranked 5th in a class of 43 cadets. With his high academic standing, he was breveted as a second lieutenant and assigned to the Second U.S. Artillery in July of that year. Not long afterwards, on October 31, he was given the full rank of second lieutenant and reassigned to the Third Artillery. He saw his first combat action serving in the Florida hostilities against the Seminole Indians.

From 1850 until 1853, he was attached to Forts Sullivan and Preble in Maine, primarily serving on garrison duty. Promotion came relatively slowly in the antebellum army, and officers often resigned to take up civilian pursuits. Duncan Johnson was no exception. On Christmas Eve in 1853, his promotion to first lieutenant came through, but he was frustrated with army life. He was the assistant on the Northern Pacific railroad exploration until December 1854. He tendered his resignation from the U.S. Army on January 31, 1855, and entered private life in Louisiana.

Duncan became the Superintendent of Construction and Repairs in New Orleans, in charge of the branch mint, marine hospital, quarantine warehouse, and the Pas a l'Outre boarding station. Duncan, in collaboration with P.G.T. Beauregard, completed the work on the New Orleans Branch Mint in early 1859. From then until 1860, he was professionally occupied as a civil engineer, surveyor, and architect in New Orleans. In 1861, he became Chief Engineer of the Board of Public Works of the state of Louisiana.

== Civil War ==
When the Southern states began seceding from the Union, Duncan reentered military service for the Confederate States of America. He enlisted in the CSA forces as a colonel of the 1st Louisiana Regular Artillery Regiment and rose in rank and status rather quickly. Promoted to brigadier general of Louisiana troops on January 7, 1862, he was assigned to command the defenses of New Orleans and the Lower Mississippi. He quickly became widely known as one of the finest artillerists in that region. He commanded Forts Jackson and St. Philip at the time of their capture by Flag Officer David Farragut on April 25, 1862. He was taken prisoner. After being exchanged, Duncan was assigned to the staff of General Braxton Bragg, becoming Chief of Staff.

Johnson K. Duncan contracted a malarial fever and died far from his native York County at Knoxville, Tennessee on December 18, 1862, at the age of 35. He was buried in the McGavock Confederate Cemetery on the Carnton Plantation in Franklin, Tennessee.

== See also ==
- List of American Civil War generals (Confederate)
