= CSS Anglo-Norman =

Steam gunboat

History

Confederate States
- Name: Anglo-Norman
- Operator: Confederate States Navy
- Completed: 1850
- Acquired: January 16, 1862
- Fate: Burned or captured, April 1862

General characteristics
- Type: Gunboat
- Length: 175 ft 2 in (53.39 m)
- Beam: 29 ft 5 in (8.97 m)
- Draft: 9 ft (2.7 m)
- Propulsion: Steam engine; side-wheel
- Complement: 35 to 80
- Armament: 1 × 32-pounder gun (Note: Anglo-Norman possessed at least one 32-pounder gun and possibly another gun as well.)

CSS Anglo-Norman was a side-wheel steam gunboat of the Confederate States of America. Built at Algiers, Louisiana in 1850 and thereafter employed as a towboat by the Southern Steamship Company in New Orleans, Anglo-Norman was seized by Confederate forces on January 16, 1862. The steamer was one of fourteen ships acquired by Brigadier General Mansfield Lovell with the backing of the Confederate Secretary of War, for possible conversion to gunboats and rams in the Mississippi River Defense Fleet.

At the time of the action at Ports Jackson and St. Philip, April 1862, Anglo-Norman was not mentioned as one of the River Defense Fleet. The steamer is recorded as burning on April 27, but nevertheless appears as one of the 22 listed in the prize cases before arbitrators on 1 May 1862.
