= CSS Stonewall Jackson =

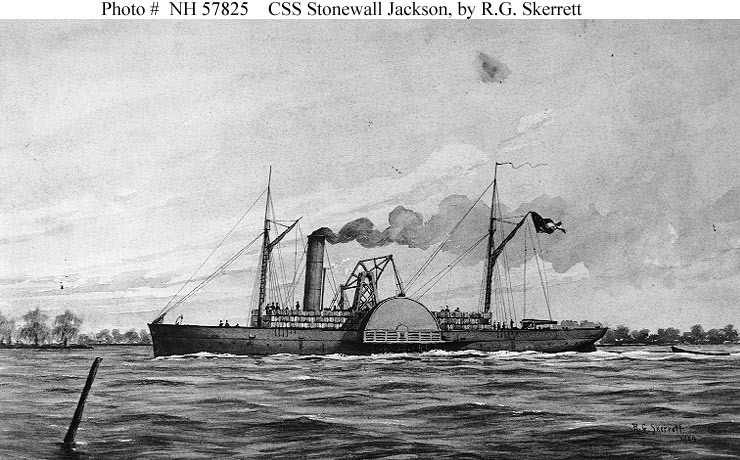

History

Confederate States
- Name: Stonewall Jackson
- Namesake: Stonewall Jackson
- Acquired: January 1862
- Commissioned: March 1862
- Fate: Driven ashore and burned, 24 April 1862

General characteristics
- Type: Sidewheel ram
- Propulsion: Steam engine, side-wheels
- Complement: 30
- Armament: 1 × 32-pounder gun or 24-pounder smoothbore

CSS Stonewall Jackson was a cottonclad sidewheel ram of the Confederate Navy during the American Civil War.

Stonewall Jackson was selected in January 1862, by Capt. James E. Montgomery to be part of his River Defense Fleet at New Orleans. On 25 January Montgomery began to convert her into a cottonclad ram by placing a 4-inch (100 mm) oak sheath with 1-inch (25 mm) iron covering on her bow, and by installing double pine bulkheads fitted with compressed cotton bales.

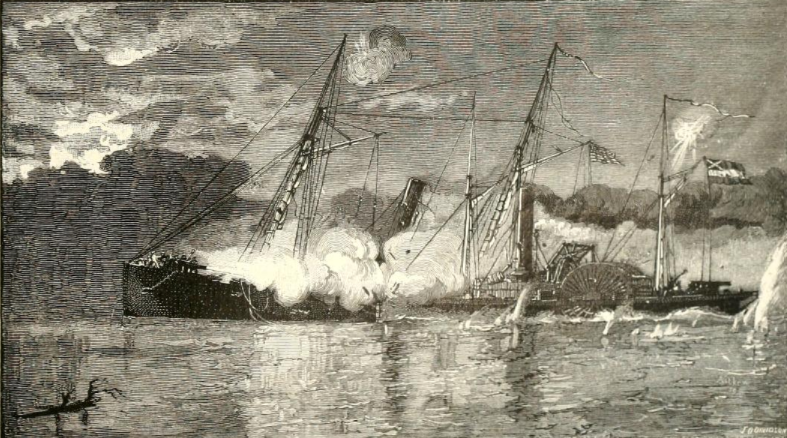
CSS Stonewall Jackson rams USS Varuna.

== Service history ==
Stonewall Jackson's conversion was completed on 16 March 1862. Under Capt. G. M. Phillips she was detached from Montgomery's main force and sent to Forts Jackson and St. Philip on the lower Mississippi to cooperate in the Confederate defense of New Orleans. There, with five other vessels of Montgomery's fleet, all under Capt. J. A. Stevenson, she joined the force under Capt. J. K. Mitchell, CSN, commanding Confederate naval forces in the lower Mississippi.

On 24 April 1862 a Union fleet under Flag Officer David Farragut, USN, ran past Forts Jackson and St. Philip on its way to capture New Orleans. In the engagement Stonewall Jackson rammed USS Varuna, which had already been struck by CSS Governor Moore. With Varuna's shot glancing off her bow, Stonewall Jackson backed off for another blow and struck again in the same place, crushing Varuna's side. The shock of the blow turned the Confederate vessel, and she received five 8-inch shells from Varuna, abaft her armor. Varuna ran aground in a sinking condition, and Stonewall Jackson, chased by USS Oneida coming to Varuna's rescue, was driven ashore and burned.

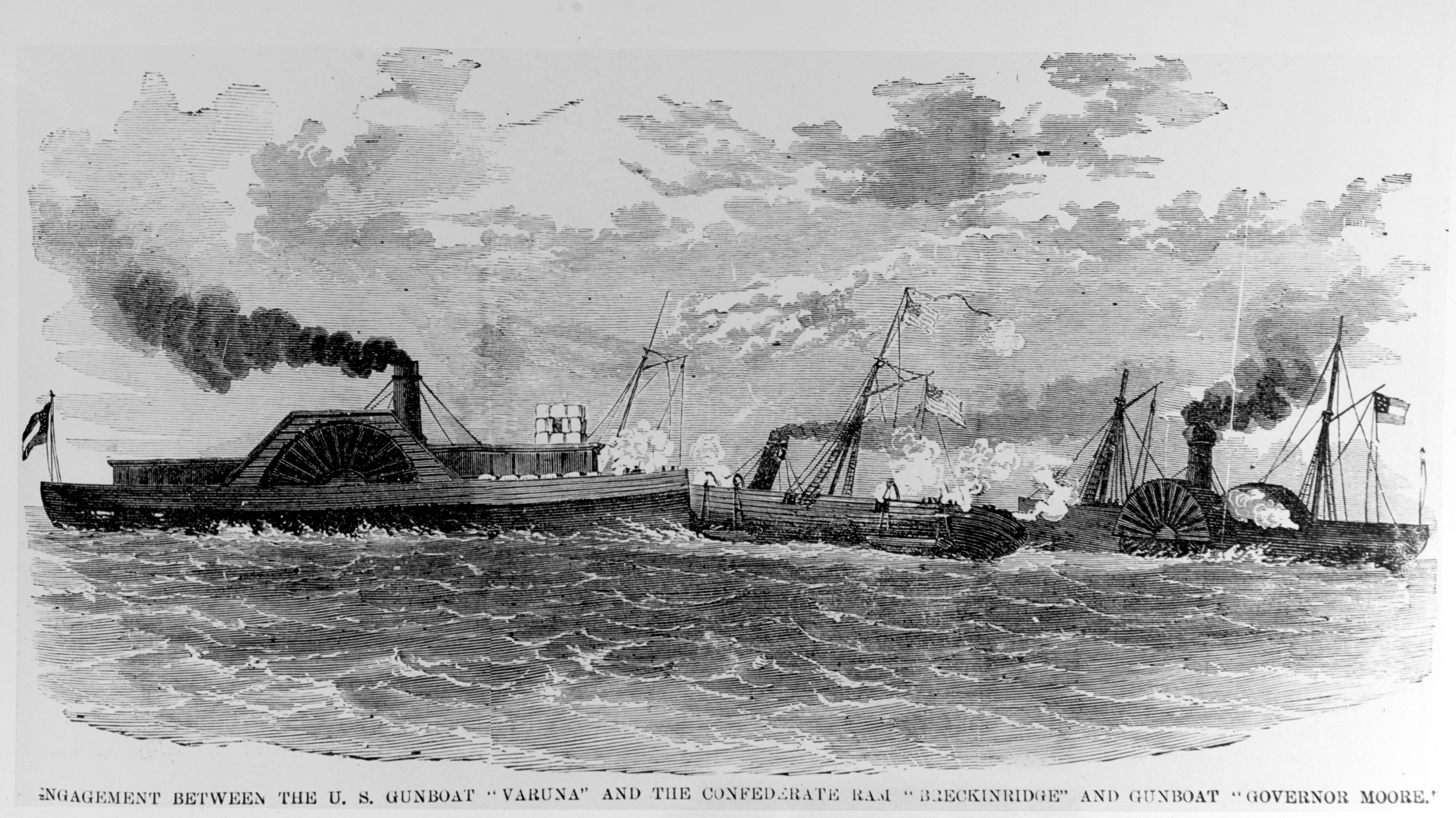
Engraving published in "The Soldier in Our Civil War", Volume I. It depicts USS Varuna (center), being rammed by a Confederate ship identified as "Breckinridge" (left) while engaging CSS Governor Moore (right) during the battle off Forts Jackson and St. Philip, 24 April 1862. The ship identified as "Breckinridge", is more probably the Stonewall Jackson.

== See also ==
- Bibliography of early American naval history
- CSS Stonewall (which later became Japanese ironclad Kōtetsu)
