= CSS General Lovell =

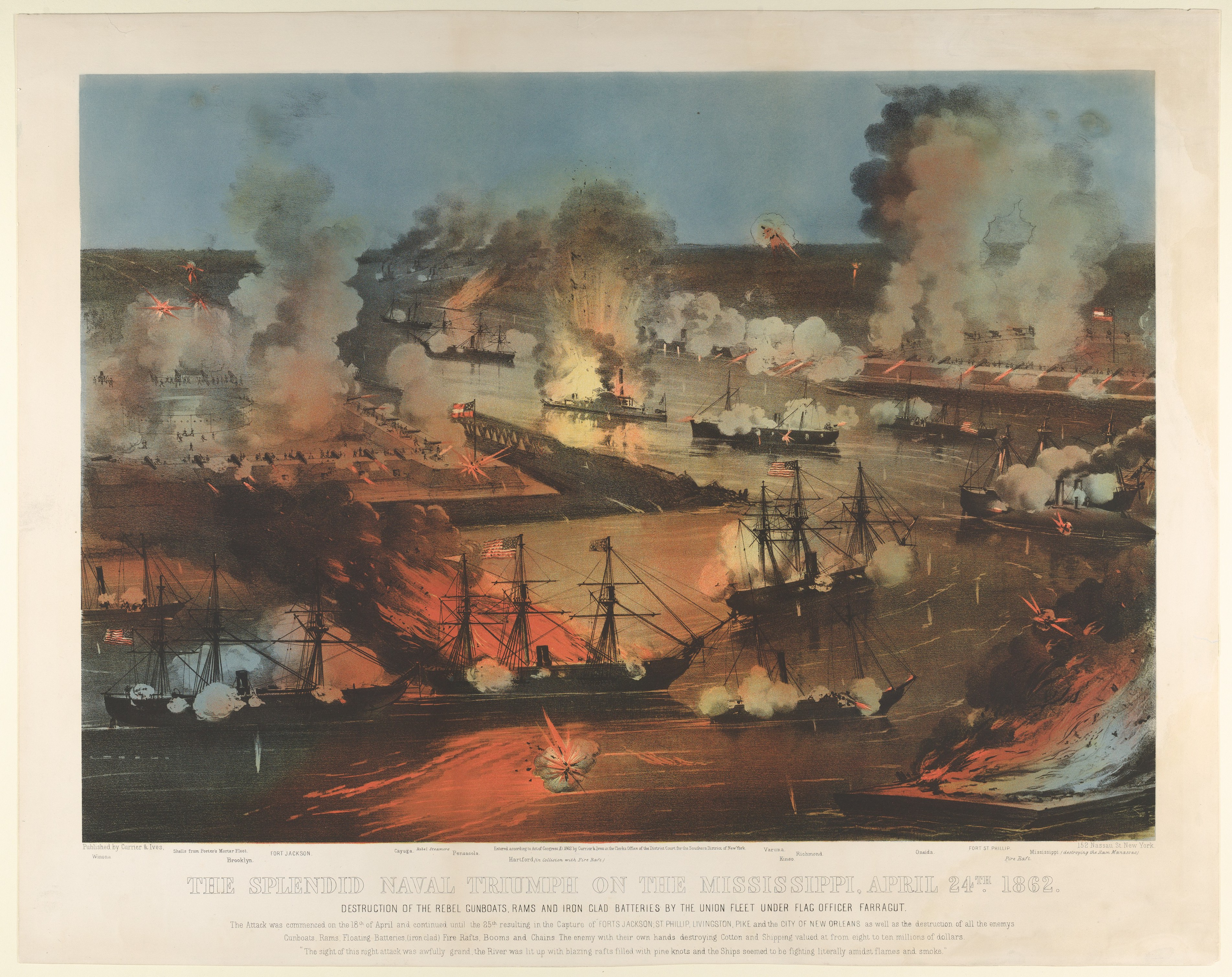
- Attack of the Union fleet, April 24, 1862; Fort Jackson at left and Fort St. Philip is shown at right

History
- Launched: 1845
- Reclassified: 1862
- Fate: Refitted as a ram

General characteristics
- Type: Sidewheel tug
- Propulsion: Steam engine, side-wheels

History
- Name: General Lovell
- Namesake: Mansfield Lovell
- Commissioned: March 1862
- Fate: Abandoned by crew and burned, 24 April 1862

General characteristics
- Type: Sidewheel ram
- Propulsion: Steam engine, side-wheels
- Complement: 40–50
- Armament: 1 × 32-pounder gun

Service record
- Part of: River Defense Fleet
- Operations: Battle of Forts Jackson and St. Philip

CSS General Lovell was a cotton-clad sidewheel ram of the Confederate Navy during the American Civil War.

Originally built in 1845 as a steam tug in Cincinnati, the ship was purchased for service in the Confederacy and refitted at New Orleans, where she was converted into a cottonclad ram with cotton bales sandwiched between double pine bulkheads to protect her boilers and machinery and iron casing over her bow. She was recommissioned in March 1862, and named for Major General Mansfield Lovell, commander of the defenses of New Orleans. She became part of the River Defense Fleet, under the overall command of Captain J. E. Montgomery, at New Orleans.

== Service history ==
General Lovell's conversion was completed on 22 April 1862. Under Captain B. Paris she was detached from Montgomery's main force and sent to Forts Jackson and St. Philip on the lower Mississippi to cooperate in the Confederate defense of New Orleans. There, with five other vessels of Montgomery's fleet, all under Capt. J. A. Stevenson, she joined the force under Capt. J. K. Mitchell, CSN, commanding Confederate naval forces in the lower Mississippi.

On 24 April 1862 a Union fleet under Flag Officer David Farragut, USN, ran past Forts Jackson and St. Philip on its way to capture New Orleans. General Lovell was abandoned by her crew after being set on fire to keep her from falling into Union hands.

== See also ==
- Bibliography of early American naval history
