= USS Isilda (1861) =

History

United States
- Name: USS Isilda
- Namesake: Previous name retained
- Acquired: 30 September 1861
- Commissioned: 1861
- Decommissioned: 1863
- Fate: Sold

General characteristics
- Type: Schooner
- Draft: 8 ft (2.4 m)
- Armament: one 24-pounder cannon

USS Isilda, sometimes spelled Ezilda, was an armed schooner in commission in the United States Navy from 1861 to 1863. As part of the Union Navy, she saw service during the American Civil War.

== Service history ==
=== Confederate service ===
Early in the American Civil War, Isilda operated under the British flag as a Confederate blockade runner. She sailed from Havana, Cuba, on 26 September 1861, cleared for Matamoros, Mexico. The U.S. Navy armed screw steamer USS South Carolina captured her in the Gulf of Mexico 4 to 5 nautical miles (7.4 to 9.3 km) off Timbalier Light, Louisiana, on 30 September 1861 and claimed her as a prize.

=== U.S. Navy service ===
The U.S. Navy took possession of Isilda and fitted her out as a tender. She joined the Gulf Blockading Squadron on 1 November 1861 to serve as tender to USS South Carolina in support of the Union blockade of the Confederacy in the Gulf of Mexico.

For a short time, Isilda was on duty off the Mississippi Delta, but her most distinguished service was performed off the west coast of Florida. Isilda fired a shot across the bow of an unidentified schooner standing in for shore off Cedar Key, Florida, on 24 April 1862. When the vessel refused to heave to, Isilda gave chase until the blockade runner slipped into shoal water and ran hard aground; on 26 April 1862, as an armed launch from Isilda was pulling toward the grounded schooner, a column of black smoke rose from the stern of the blockade runner and she blew up with a loud report. Isilda scored again on 10 June 1862 when she surprised the Confederate steamer Havana in Deadman's Bay on the coast of Florida and forced Havana′s crew to put her to the torch to prevent capture. On 24 March 1863, with the schooner USS Wanderer, she chased the Confederate sloop Ranger, enabling the sidewheel paddle steamer USS Fort Henry to capture Ranger and her cargo of salt, dry goods, and gunpowder off Crystal River, Florida.

By April 1863, after participating in an expedition which scoured the west coast of Florida from the mouth of the Suwanee River to the Anclote Keys, Isilda showed signs of serious wear and tear. She remained on station off Cedar Key until 11 June 1863 when she finally sailed to Key West, Florida, for repairs. There, when a survey found her too badly battered for economical repair, and she was condemned, stripped, and sold at public auction.
