= CSS General Quitman (transport) =

General Quitman was a river transport whose history from mid-January to 24 June 1862 is difficult to disentangle in official records from that of the former "sea steamer" Galveston, burned under the name General Quitman to escape capture when New Orleans fell to Farragut's forces. General Quitman is believed to have been built at New Albany, Ind. in 1859 for a New Orleans ship owner. She was "one of the best and most powerful boats on the river" in 1862 and one of the last to escape from the city the 24th, evacuating upriver "a good many ladies, some officers, and some ordnance stores." General Quitman continued to serve the Confederate States Army as a troop and supply ship on the western rivers until war's end. Passed to private ownership, she sank at New Texas Landing, near Morganza, Louisiana, 23 October 1868.
