= CSS Defiance =

History

Confederate States
- Name: Defiance
- Operator: Confederate States Navy
- Fate: Burned to prevent capture.

General characteristics
- Type: Steam side-wheel gunboat
- Armament: 1 × 32-pounder smoothbore gun

Defiance, a high-pressure steamer, was built at Cincinnati, Ohio, in 1849. She was purchased for the Confederate Army, probably from the Southern Steamship Co., New Orleans, La., in the latter part of 1861. Capt. J. E. Montgomery, a former river steamboat captain, selected her to be part of his River Defense Fleet. On January 25, 1862, he began to convert her into a cottonclad ram by placing a 4-inch oak sheath with a one-inch iron covering on her bow, and by installing double pine bulkheads filled with compressed cotton bales.

On March 10, 1862, Defiance's conversion was completed and she steamed from New Orleans to Fort Jackson on the lower Mississippi to operate in the Confederate defense of New Orleans. Defiance, with five other ships of Montgomery's fleet in that area was under the overall command of Capt. J. A. Stevenson, who operated under Capt. J. K. Mitchell, commanding Confederate naval forces on the lower Mississippi.

When Flag Officer D. G. Farragut, USN, ran his fleet past Forts Jackson and St. Philip on April 24, 1862, on his way to New Orleans, Defiance, under Capt. J. D. McCoy, was the only river defense vessel to escape destruction or capture. On April 26, Captain Stevenson turned her over directly to Captain Mitchell after her captain, officers, and crew left her. On April 28, Captain Mitchell, not having enough men for a crew, and realizing that capture was inevitable after the forts surrendered, burned her to keep her from falling into Union hands.

== Bibliography ==
- Silverstone, Paul H. (2006). Civil War Navies 1855–1883. The U.S. Navy Warship Series. New York: Routledge. ISBN 978-0-415-97870-5.
