= Governor Moore (gunboat) =

Steamboat

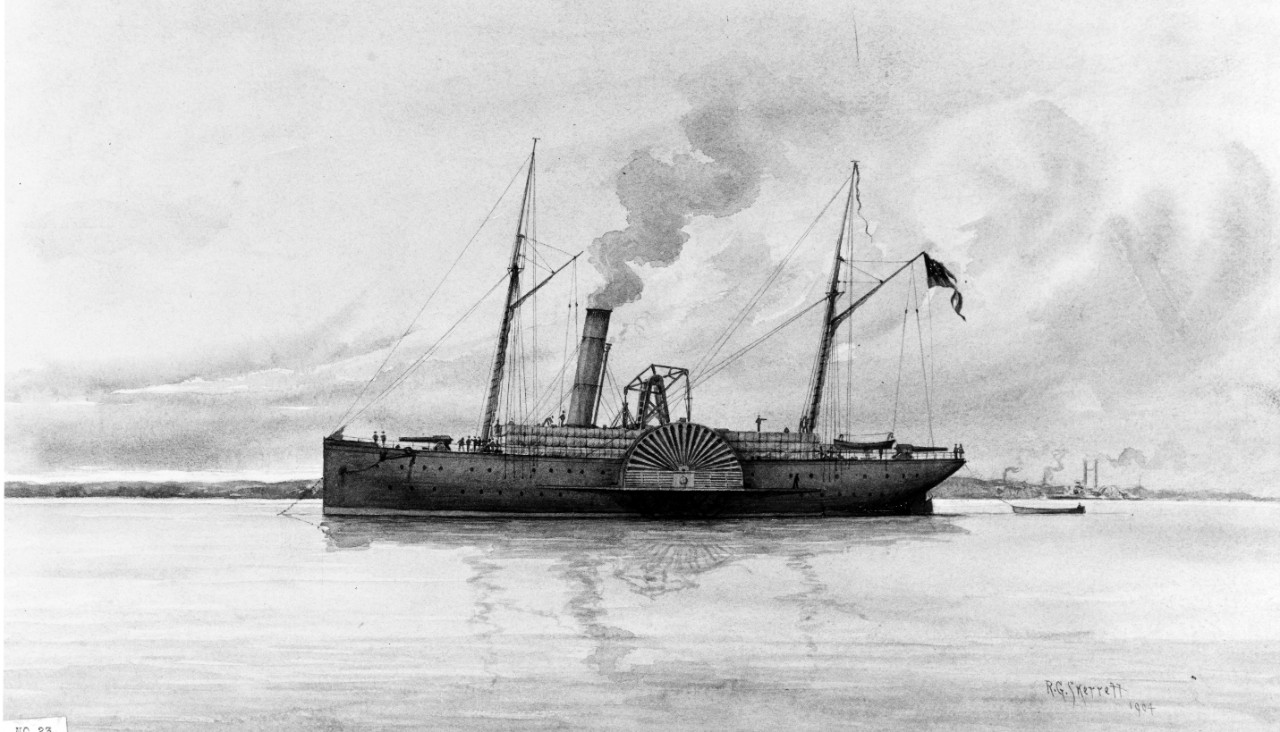
- A 1904 drawing of CSS Governor Moore

History

Confederate States of America
- Name: CSS Governor Moore
- Namesake: Thomas Overton Moore
- Launched: 1854
- Commissioned: 1862
- Decommissioned: 24 April 1862
- Fate: Disabled by enemy fire, destroyed to prevent capture

General characteristics
- Displacement: 1215 tons
- Propulsion: Steam engine
- Complement: 93 officers and men
- Armament: 2 32-pounder rifled cannons
- Notes: 74 casualties: 57 killed; 4 died of wounds; 13 wounded

CSS Governor Moore was a schooner-rigged steamer in the Confederate States Navy.

Governor Moore had been Southern S. S. Company's Charles Morgan, named for the firm's founder and built at New York in 1854 as a schooner-rigged, low pressure, walking beam-engined, seagoing steamer. She was seized at New Orleans, Louisiana by Brigadier General Mansfield Lovell, CSA, in mid-January 1862 "for the public service." As a gunboat, renamed for Louisiana's Governor Thomas Overton Moore, her stem was reinforced for ramming by two strips of flat railroad iron at the waterline, strapped and bolted in place, with pine lumber and cotton-bale barricades to protect her boilers, but the Governor Moore was never commissioned as a ship in the Confederate States Navy.

The larger of two similar cotton-clads owned and operated by the State of Louisiana, Governor Moore was commanded for some time by Lieutenant Beverly Kennon, CSN, then serving as Commander in the Louisiana Provisional Navy without pay. She distinguished herself in the battle of 24 April 1862, when Admiral David Farragut, USN, passed Fort Jackson and Fort St. Philip before dawn en route to capture New Orleans. After a furious exchange of raking fire, Governor Moore twice rammed USS Varuna, and a third thrust from another cottonclad forced Varuna aground. Next attacking USS Cayuga, Governor Moore exposed herself to fire from most of the Union flotilla. With practically her whole upper hamper shot away and 61 men dead or dying, she went out of command, drifting helplessly to shore, where her captain, pilot, and a seaman set her afire. Governor Moore blew up while they and three other survivors were being captured by USS Oneida's boats to be imprisoned on board USS Colorado; two-thirds of the two dozen or more crew members escaped into the marshes, the rest being captured by other ships' launches; no one drowned.

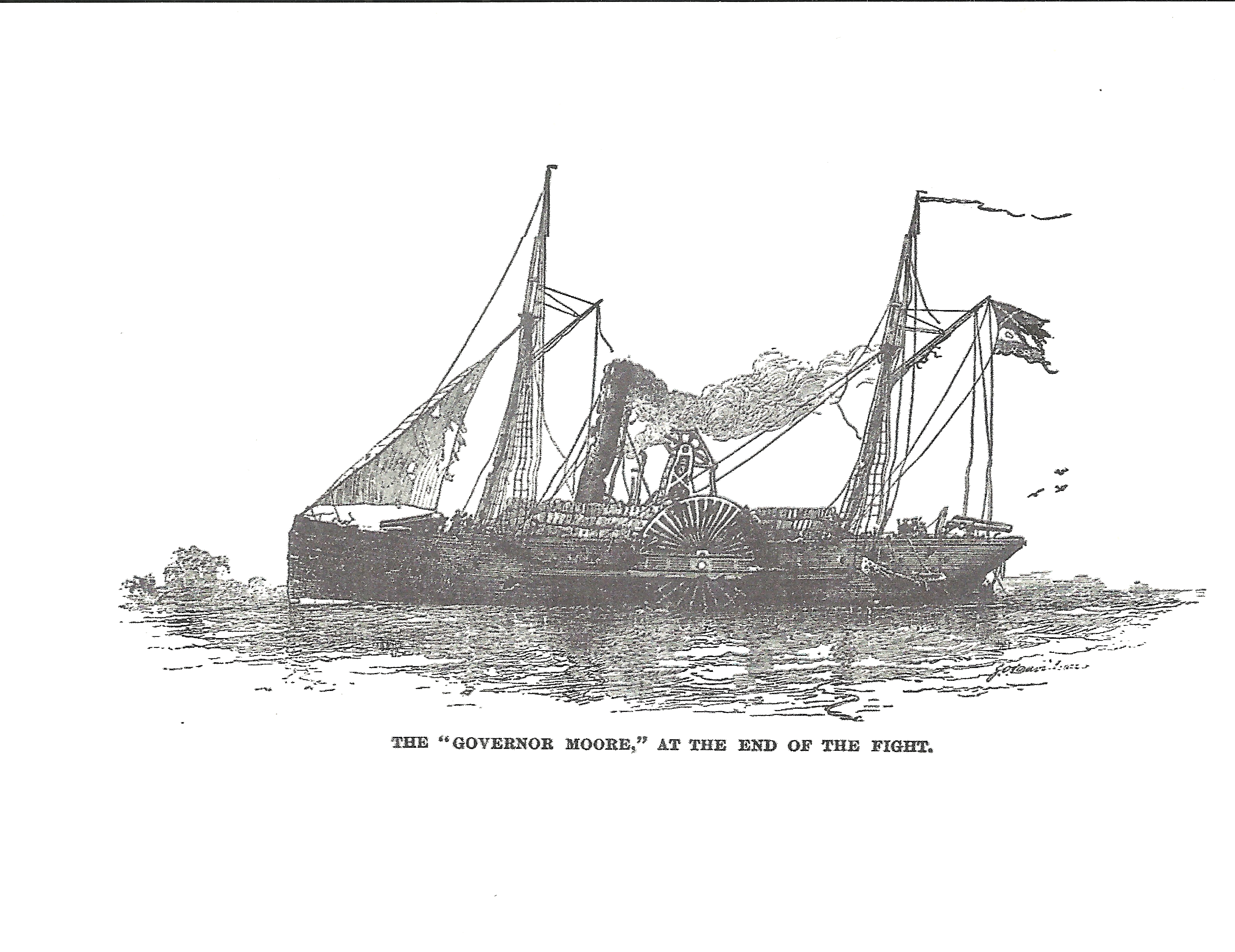
A drawing depicting CSS Governor Moore after her fight

"The pennant and remains of the ensign were never hauled down," wrote Kennon from Colorado. "The flames that lit our decks stood faithful sentinels over their halyards until they, like the ship, were entirely consumed. I burned the bodies of the slain. Our colors were shot away three times. I hoisted them myself twice; finally every stripe was taken out of the flag, leaving a small constellation of four little stars only, which showed to our enemy how bravely we had defended them." The ship sank with the Louisiana's colors flying (It is unclear if the flag referred to was the Confederate Stars and Bars or Louisiana State banner of January 1861; the Dictionary of American Naval Fighting Ships claims the latter.).

== See also ==
- Bibliography of early United States naval history
