= List of ship launches in 1861 =

The list of ship launches in 1861 is a chronological list of ships launched in 1861.

Date	Ship	Class/type	Builder	Location	Country	Notes
1 January	Undaunted	Bristol-class frigate		Chatham Dockyard	United Kingdom	For Royal Navy.
10 January	Cabinet	Barque	J. Davison	Sunderland	United Kingdom	For Clark & Co.
11 January	Balbirnie	Steamship	Messrs. Morton	Leith	United Kingdom	For private owner.
12 January	Bombay	Full-rigged ship	John Vaux	Harwich Dockyard	United Kingdom	For private owner.
12 January	Grecian	Cargo ship	E. J. Harland	Belfast	United Kingdom	For J. Bibby & Sons.
24 January	Coringa	Steamship	Messrs. Alexander Stephen & Sons	Kelvinhaugh	United Kingdom	For Calcutta and Burmah Steam Navigation Company.
25 January	Newsky	Steamship	William Simons & Co.	Renfrew	United Kingdom	For private owner.
25 January	Unnamed	Tug	William Simons & Co	Glasgow	United Kingdom	For Barrow Steam Navigation Co.
26 January	Chaturanga	Barque	J. & J. Brown	Pallion	United Kingdom	For Hudson & Co.
26 January	Dovercourt	Full-rigged ship	John Vaux	Harwich Dockyard	United Kingdom	For R. W. Madam.
26 January	Elaine	Merchantman	T. R. Oswald	Sunderland	United Kingdom	For E. T. Gourley.
28 January	Catherine	Sloop	John B. Jarrett	Nevin	United Kingdom	For private owner.
28 January	Mary A. Williams	Schooner	Edward F. Williams	Greenpoint, New York	United States	For New York Pilots.
29 January	Finzel	Barque	Messrs. R. & J. Evans	Liverpool	United Kingdom	For Mr. Finzel.
29 January	Junon	Frigate		Brest	France	For French Navy.
29 January	Mary Cumming	Schooner	Robert Innes	Leith	United Kingdom	For J. Warrack and others.
29 January	Alecton	Alecton-class wheeled aviso	Forges et Chantiers de la Mediterranée	La Seyne	France	For French Navy.
30 January	Neva	Steamship	Messrs. Charles & William Earle	Hull	United Kingdom	For Messrs. Norwood & Co.
30 January	The Farmer	Fishing smack	T. Smith	Fleetwood	United Kingdom	For Messrs. Sumner & Co.
30 January	William H. Aspinwall	Schooner	J. B. Van Dusen Bros.	New York	United States	For James Callaghan, Mrs. Dale, John Shooks and Henry Weaver.
January	Hibernian	Steamship	Messrs. William Denny & Bros.	Dumbarton	United Kingdom	For Montreal Ocean Steamship Company.
January	Plough Boy	Schooner	J. & R. Bailey	Shoreham-by-Sea	United Kingdom	For Field & Co.
7 February	Grille	Gunboat		Trieste	Austria	For Austrian Navy.
7 February	Pandora	Philomel-class gunvessel		Pembroke Dockyard	United Kingdom	For Royal Navy.
9 February	Chanticleer	Camelion-class sloop		Portsmouth Dockyard	United Kingdom	For Royal Navy.
9 February	Polynia	Steamship	Messrs. Stephen & Son	Dundee	United Kingdom	For private owner.
12 February	Bristol	Bristol-class frigate		Woolwich Dockyard	United Kingdom	For Royal Navy.
12 February	Moulmein	Steamship	Messrs. Simons & Co.	Renfrew	United Kingdom	For Calcutta and Burmah Steam Navigation Company.
16 February	Terribile	Formidabile-class ironclad	Société Nouvelle des Forges et Chantiers de la Méditerranée	La Seyne	France	For Royal Sardinian Navy.
23 February	Castor	Alecton-class wheeled aviso	Forges et Chantiers de la Mediterranee	La Seyne	France	For French Navy.
26 February	Prince Alfred	Paddle steamer	Messrs. J. & G. Thompson	Govan	United Kingdom	For North Lancashire Steam Navigation Company.
26 February	Queen of the Thames	Steamship	Waterman's Steam Packet Company	Woolwich	United Kingdom	For Waterman's Steam Packet Company.
26 February	Ville de Lyon	Ville de Nantes-class ship of the line	Arsenal de Brest	Brest	France	For French Navy.
27 February	Black Prince	Ironclad	Robert Napier and Sons	Glasgow	United Kingdom	For Royal Navy
27 February	Mary Tweeddale	Schooner	Messrs. Sinclair	Stirling	United Kingdom	For private owner.
27 February	Sicilia	Steamship	Messrs. Richardson & Duck	Stockton-on-Tees	United Kingdom	For London and Mediterranean Steam Navigation Company.
27 February	Ward Jackson	Schooner	Rees Jones	Port Dinorwic	United Kingdom	For Rees Jones and William Jones.
28 February	Gitana	Full-rigged ship	N. Cox	Roodee	United Kingdom	For Messrs. Charles Moore & Co.
February	Flower of the Forest	Brig	Cochar	Montrose	United Kingdom	For Messrs. George Milne & Sons.
February	Kelso	Full-rigged ship	William Pile	Sunderland	United Kingdom	For J. R. Kekso.
February	Saone	Steamship	Messrs. Henderson	Renfrew	United Kingdom	For Oriental Inland Steam Navigation Company. Dismantled for re-erection in India.
February	Zealand	Steamship	John Laird	Birkenhead	United Kingdom	For Messrs. Bailey & Leetham.
2 March	Beannuamha	Clipper	Messrs. Thomas Vernon & Son	Liverpool	United Kingdom	For Messrs. J. & T. Sinclair.
9 March	Andalousie	Steamship	Forges et Chantiers de la Mediterranée	La Seyne	France	For Compagnie des Messageries Imperiales.
11 March	Hope	Schooner	Henry Steers	Greenpoint, New York	United States	For Thomas B. Ives.
13 March	Guadalete	Steamship	Messrs. Henderson	Renfrew	United Kingdom	For private owner.
25 March	Hero	Steamship	Messrs. Earles'	Hull	United Kingdom	For Messrs. Thomas Wilson, Sons, & Co.
26 March	Ambrose	Full-rigged ship	Messrs. J. Wigham Richardson & Co.	Wallsend	United Kingdom	For Messrs. J. P. Schlizzi & Co.
27 March	American	Paddle steamer	Kerman	Millbrook	United Kingdom	For Southampton and Isle of Wight Steamship Company.
27 March	Ann Morgan	Schooner		Penmaenpool	United Kingdom	For Robert Jones.
27 March	Defiance	Ship of the line		Pembroke Dockyard	United Kingdom	For Royal Navy.
27 March	General Havelock	Steamship	James Laing	Sunderland	United Kingdom	For Mr. Smurthwaite.
27 March	Italian	Cargo ship	Harland & Wolff	Belfast	United Kingdom	For J. Bibby & Sons.
28 March	Couronne	Ironclad	Arsenal de Lorient	Lorient	France	For French Navy.
28 March	Dupleix	Cosmao-class corvette		Cherbourg	France	For French Navy.
28 March	Glasgow	Bristol-class frigate		Portsmouth Dockyard	United Kingdom	For Royal Navy.
28 March	J. H. Ransom	Barque	John Ransom	Northam	United Kingdom	For John Ransom.
28 March	Swatow	Steamship	Messrs. Wingate & Co.	Whiteinch	United Kingdom	For private owner.
30 March	Commodore	Full-rigged ship	Messrs. D. Burns & Co.	Aberdeen	United Kingdom	For private owner.
March	Ann	Schooner	Pace, Blumer & Co.	Sunderland	United Kingdom	For Mr. Hodge.
March	Caroline	Schooner	Camper	Gosport	United Kingdom	For W. Quin.
March	Lord of the Isles	Paddle steamer	Thames Ironworks and Shipbuilding Company	Blackwall	United Kingdom	For Southampton and Isle of Wight Steamship Company.
March	St. Lawrence	East Indiaman	Messrs. T. & W. Smith	Newcastle upon Tyne	United Kingdom	For Messrs. T. & W. Smith.
2 April	Santiago de Cuba	Paddle steamer	Jeremiah Simonson	Greenpoint, New York	United States	For Valiente & Co.
4 April	Invincible	Ironclad	Arsenal de Toulon	Toulon	France	For French Navy.
6 April	Italia	Frigate		Castellamare di Stabia	Italy	For Regia Marina.
11 April	Resistance	Defence-class ironclad	Westwood, Baillie & Co.	Poplar	United Kingdom	For Royal Navy.
11 April	Magicien	Alecton-class wheeled aviso	Forges et Chantiers de la Méditerranée	La Seyne	France	For French Navy
11 April	Wye	Steamship	Messrs. Patterson	Bristol	United Kingdom	For private owner.
12 April	City of New York	Steamship	Messrs Tod & MacGregor	Glasgow	United Kingdom	For Liverpool, New York and Philadelphia Steam Shipping Company.
12 April	Ismay	Barque	Messrs. Stephen	Glasgow	United Kingdom	For private owner.
12 April	Mexico	Brigantine	Messrs. Stephen	Glasgow	United Kingdom	For private owner.
13 April	Annie Grieve	Schooner	Messrs. Denny & Rankine	Dumbarton	United Kingdom	For Duncan Hendry and others.
13 April	Margaret Kerr	Full-rigged ship	Messrs. A. M'Millan & Son	Dumbarton	United Kingdom	For John Kerr.
13 April	Shamrock	Steam yacht	Thomas B. Seath	Rutherglen	United Kingdom	For Marquess of Conyngham.
13 April	Water Lily	Yawl	Messrs. Harvey & Son	Wivenhoe	United Kingdom	For Lord Alfred Paget.
15 April	Blue Bell	Schooner	Messrs. Bayley	Ipswich	United Kingdom	For Messrs. Goddard, Haggar & Mills.
24 April	Defence	Defence-class ironclad	Palmers Shipbuilding and Iron Company	Jarrow	United Kingdom	For Royal Navy.
24 April	Mary E. Fish	Schooner	Edward F. Williams	Greenpoint, New York	United States	For New York Pilots.
24 April	Mary Hannah	Schooner	Robert Thomas	Nevin	United Kingdom	For George Frederick North.
24 April	Reliance	Schooner	Robert Thomas	Nevin	United Kingdom	For private owner.
25 April	Middlesex	Full-rigged ship	John Watson	Sunderland	United Kingdom	For George Marshall.
25 April	Miss Hunt	Schooner	Thomas Williams	Caernarfon	United Kingdom	For private owner.
25 April	Queen of Nations	Clipper	Walter Hood	Aberdeen	United Kingdom	For George Thompson Jr.
26 April	Æolus	Cutter	Fyfe	Fairlie	United Kingdom	For C. T. Couper.
27 April	Batallion	Steamship	Messrs. Palmer Bros	Howdon	United Kingdom	For Messrs. Laing & Stephens.
27 April	Volage	Yacht	Messrs. Ratsey & Sons	Cowes	United Kingdom	For Lord Colville.
29 April	Jura	Steamship	Messrs. M'Millan & Son	Dumbarton	United Kingdom	For Messrs. Fyfe & McCulloch.
April	Devina	Steamship	Messrs. Barclay, Curle & Cohawl	Stobcross	United Kingdom	For Leith, Hull and Hamburg Shipping Company.
April	Ironside	Full-rigged ship	Thomas R. Oswald	Pallion	United Kingdom	For Temperley & Co.
April	Lope de Vega	Steamship	Messrs. Scott & Co.	Greenock	United Kingdom	For private owner.
April	Memnon	Schooner	Messrs. Scott & Co.	Greenock	United Kingdom	For Messrs. Holt, Lamport & Co.
April	Osborne	Steamship	Messrs. Blackwood & Gordon	Port Glasgow	United Kingdom	For Messrs. G. Gibson & Co.
April	St. Claspar	Paddle Steamer		River Tyne	United Kingdom	For Citizens' Company.
2 May	Caerwys Castle	Schooner	Messrs. Ferguson, McCallum & Baird	Flint	United Kingdom	For David Jones.
7 May	Outro	Paddle steamer	Archibald Denny	Dumbarton	United Kingdom	For private owner.
8 May	Fingal	Steamship	Messrs. J. & G. Thomson	Govan	United Kingdom	For Messrs. D. Hutcheson & Co.
8 May	Lady Nyassa	Steam yacht	Messrs. Tod & MacGregor	Glasgow	United Kingdom	For David Livingstone. Dismantled post-launch for re-erection on the Zambezi.
9 May	Pride of the South	Brig	George Lungley	Northam	United Kingdom	For private owner.
10 May	Cerdagne	Steamship		La Seyne	France	For Compagnie des Messageries Imperiales.
10 May	Norwegian	Steamship	Messrs. Denny & Rankin	Dumbarton	United Kingdom	For Montreal Ocean Steamship Company.
10 May	Ospray	Chinaman	Messrs. Denny & Rankin	Dumbarton	United Kingdom	For Messrs. Martin & Co.
11 May	Volunteer	Steamship	Messrs. S. & H. Morton & Co.	Leith	United Kingdom	For private owner.
13 May	Order	Steamship	Messrs. Earle's	Hull	United Kingdom	For private owner.
17 May	Morben	Smack	John Jones	Aberdovey	United Kingdom	For John Evans.
18 May	Henrietta	Schooner	Henry Steers	Greenpoint, New York	United States	For James Gordon Bennett Jr.
18 May	Mary Celeste	Brigantine	Joshua Dewis	Spencer's Island	(United Kingdom of Great Britain and Ireland) Colony of Nova Scotia	For private owner.
18 May	Mayflower	Tug	Stothert & Marten	Bristol	United Kingdom	For private owner.
23 May	Black Eagle	Steam yacht	Mr. M'Lea	Rothesay	United Kingdom	For F. Boyle.
23 May	Good Hope	Brig	Messrs. Badenoch & Stewart	Garmouth	United Kingdom	For Herman Ganson.
24 May	Rosette	Schooner	Mr. M'Lea	Rothesay	United Kingdom	For H. Rigge.
25 May	Medea	Schooner	Great Western Shipyard	Bristol	United Kingdom	For B. Hartley.
25 May	Pei-ho	Floating battery			France	For French Navy.
25 May	Tartar	Steamship	Messrs. Richardson & Duck	Stockton-on-Tees	United Kingdom	For Messrs. Bailey & Leetham.
25 May	The Murray	Clipper	Alexander Hall & Co.	Aberdeen	United Kingdom	For James Thompson & Co.
29 May	Tancrède	Lynx-class aviso	Chaigneau et Bichon	Lormont	France	For French Navy.
May	Dalmat	Gunboat		Trieste	Austria	For Austrian Navy.
May	(United Kingdom of Great Britain and Ireland) Colony of Nova Scotia		Merigomish	Eliza Frazer	Brigantine	For
May	Eunice	Barque	William Briggs & Son	Sunderland	United Kingdom	For Lewis & Co.
May	Hum	Gunboat		Trieste	Austria	For Austrian Navy.
May	Milo	Brigantine	David Banks & Co.	Plymouth	United Kingdom	For private owner.
May	Rowena	Schooner	Fyfe	Fairlie	United Kingdom	For J. S. Mills.
May	Sir James Duke	Collier	Messrs. Palmers	Howdon	United Kingdom	For Sir James Duke and partners.
May	Staffa	Clipper	T. C. Gingras	Quebec	(United Kingdom of Great Britain and Ireland) Province of Canada	For private owner.
May	Wall	Gunboat		Trieste	Austria	For Austrian Navy.
May	Wild Huntress	Merchantman	J. H. Watson	Sunderland	United Kingdom	For G. Watson.
6 June	Anglia	Steamship	John Laird	Birkenhead	United Kingdom	For private owner.
8 June	Adolf van Nassau	Frigate	Rijkswerf	Vlissingen	Netherlands	For Royal Netherlands Navy.
8 June	Jane Hughes	Schooner	Hugh Hughes	Penrhos	United Kingdom	For private owner.
8 June	Wisbech	Steamship	William Pile Jr.	Sunderland	United Kingdom	For Richard Young.
10 June	Belle Aventure	Schooner	John Barter	Brixham	United Kingdom	For John Barter, Edward Barter and others.
11 June	Susan	Cutter	Camper	Gosport	United Kingdom	For Earl of Hardwicke.
13 June	Emily	Humber Keel	John Harrison	Bevereley	United Kingdom	For E. A. Baron & Mr. Thorpe.
12 June	Earl of Elgin	Steamship	James Laing	Sunderland	United Kingdom	For H. T. Morton & Co.
20 June	Princess Royal	Steamship	Tod & MacGregor	Glasgow	United Kingdom	For M. Langlands & Sons.
21 June	Arethusa	Brig	T. Metcalfe & Sons	South Shields	United Kingdom	For William Davison.
22 June	Aurora	Imperieuse-class frigate		Pembroke Dockyard	United Kingdom	For Royal Navy.
22 June	Florence	Schooner	Ratsey	Cowes	United Kingdom	For Duke of Leeds.
22 June	Magenta	Magenta-class ironclad	M. Marman	Brest	France	For French Navy.'
22 June	Vistula	Schooner	Messrs. Stephen & Forbes	Peterhead	United Kingdom	For Messrs. Mitchell.
24 June	Solférino	Magenta-class ironclad	Arsenal de Lorient	Lorient	France	For French Navy.'
25 June	Saigon	Floating battery	M. Armand	Bordeaux	France	For French Navy.
25 June	Scotia	Ocean liner	Robert Napier and Sons	Glasgow	United Kingdom	For Cunard Line.
27 June	Arratoon Apcar	Steamship	James Henderson & Son	Renfrew	United Kingdom	For Apcar Line.
27 June	Tuscarora	Mohican-class sloop	Merrick & Sons	Philadelphia, Pennsylvania	United States	For United States Navy.
June	Ganges	Paddle steamer	James Laing	Sunderland	United Kingdom	For Oriental Inland Steamship Company. Dismantled for re-erection abroad.
June	Princess Royal	Steamship	Messrs. Tod & MacGregor	Glasgow	United Kingdom	For private owner.
June	Stag	Yawl	Messrs. White	Cowes	United Kingdom	For HM Coastguard.
5 July	Dunnikier	Barque	Messrs. Alexander Stephe & Sons	Kelvinhaugh	United Kingdom	For private owner.
6 July	Briton	Steamship	Lungley	Deptford	United Kingdom	For Union Steamship Company.
6 July	Dorothy	Barque	William Briggs & Son	Pallion	United Kingdom	For Suart & Co.
8 July	Lizzie and Ada	Brig	Messrs. Thompson & Sons	Sunderland	United Kingdom	For W. Watson.
8 July	Mary Stowe	Brig	Messrs. Pickersgill & Miller	Gloucester	United Kingdom	For private owner.
8 July	Tamand	West Indiaman	Messrs. Barclay, Curle & Co.	Stobcross	United Kingdom	For Messrs. Gregor, Turnbull & Co.
9 July	Edith	Steamship	Mr. Oswald	Sunderland	United Kingdom	For Messrs. Webster & Co.
9 July	Eugenie	Paddle steamer	Messrs. Samuelson	Hull	United Kingdom	For South Eastern Railway.
9 July	Ganges	Full-rigged ship	William Pile	Sunderland	United Kingdom	For Nourse Line.
9 July	Rattlesnake	Jason-class corvette		Chatham Dockyard	United Kingdom	For Royal Navy.
10 July	Enos	Barque	James Robinson	Sunderland	United Kingdom	For Messrs. Smith & Co.
10 July	Fame	Barque	Ratcliffe & Co.	Sunderland	United Kingdom	For Mr. Allen.
10 July	Jane Alice	Barque	Messrs. Potts Bros.	Sunderland	United Kingdom	For Messrs. Potts Bros.
10 July	Pilgrim	Schooner	David Richards	Port Mado	United Kingdom	For private owner.
10 July	Polly	Barque	Brown	Sunderland	United Kingdom	For H. Wheatley.
10 July	Saint Bernard	Barque	D. A. Douglas	Southwick	United Kingdom	For R. Girvin.
10 July	Zodiac	Barque	W. Adamson	Sunderland	United Kingdom	For Mr. Adamson.
11 July	Dorothea Wright	Merchantman	Johnston	Carrickfergus	United Kingdom	For Mr. Wright.
11 July	Knight Templar	Full-rigged ship	Messrs. Chaloner, Hart, & Sinnott	Liverpool	United Kingdom	For T. P. Sawyer.
12 July	Talarvor	Schooner	Holland	Port Madoc	United Kingdom	For Dr. Williams and others.
18 July	Osborne	Barque	Wapping Dock Company	Bristol	United Kingdom	For private owner.
20 July	Fearnot	Merchantman	George W. Jackman Jr.	Newburyport, Massachusetts	United States	For private owner.
22 July	Hebe	Steamship	Messrs. Earle's	Hull	United Kingdom	For Messrs. T. Wilson, Sons, & Co.
23 July	Andalucia	Steamship	J. G. Lawrie	Whiteinch	United Kingdom	For private owner.
23 July	Egyptian	Cargo ship	E. J. Harland	Belfast	United Kingdom	For J. Bibby & Sons.
24 July	Majestic	Brigantine	William Griffiths	Borth	United Kingdom	For Owen Lloyd.
25 July	Beautiful Star	Brigantine	Dundee Ship Building Company	Dundee	United Kingdom	For Messrs. W. Long, Page, Cox, & Co.
26 July	Harriet	Cutter	Messrs. Fyfe	Rothesay	United Kingdom	For A. J. Lamont.
July	Avoca	Steamship	Neptune Iron Works	Waterford	United Kingdom	For private owner.
July	Celcus	Barque	Messrs. Pace & Co.	Sunderland	United Kingdom	For Blumer & Co.
July	Criterion	Brig			United Kingdom	For private owner.
July	Dorothea	Barque	Thompson	Southwick	United Kingdom	For private owner.
July	Glance	Cutter	Messrs. Watson & Son	Sunderland	United Kingdom	For private owner.
July	Glenfallon	Full-rigged ship		River Clyde	United Kingdom	For private owner.
July	Kalahome	Barque	John Robinson	Sunderland	United Kingdom	For Smith & Co.
July	Kate	Schooner	William Bonker	Salcombe	United Kingdom	For William S. Hannaford, Joseph J. Tolcher and others.
July	Liberator	Barque	Robert Thompson Jr.	Sunderland	United Kingdom	For P. Scott.
July	Lord Collingwood	Barque	John Davison	Sunderland	United Kingdom	For Tully & Co.
July	Louis Napoleon	Steamship	Messrs. Scott & Co.	Greenock	United Kingdom	For private owner.
July	Pearl	Brig		Seaham	United Kingdom	For private owner.
July	Penfield	Schooner		Three Mile Bay, New York	United States	For private owner.
July	Pera	Full-rigged ship	T. R. Oswald	Sunderland	United Kingdom	For Messrs. C. Moore & Co.
July	Peterhoff	Paddle steamer	T. R. Oswald	Sunderland	United Kingdom	For private owner.
July	Rose	Brig	Messrs. Denniston & Pearson	Sunderland	United Kingdom	For W. Kish.
July	Veleda	Barque	Thomas Stonehouse	Sunderland	United Kingdom	For Walton & Co.
July	Unnamed	Clipper	W. Pile	Sunderland	United Kingdom	For private owner.
July	No. 17	Hopper barge	River Tyne Commissioners	Howdon	United Kingdom	For River Tyne Commissioners.
6 August	No. 18	Hopper barge	River Tyne Commissioners	Howdon	United Kingdom	For River Tyne Commissioners.
8 August	Chimborazo	Barque	John Batchelor, or Batchelor Bros.	Cardiff	United Kingdom	For W. Nichol.
8 August	Juno	Steamship	Messrs. Samuelson & Co.	Hull	United Kingdom	For Messrs. Thomas Wilson & Sons.
8 August	Natal	Schooner	Adamson	Alloa	United Kingdom	For Mr. Page and others.
10 August	Vaxo Andaluz	Steamship	Messrs. Tod & MacGregor	Particki	United Kingdom	For private owner.
17 August	Unadilla	Unadilla-class gunboat	Novelty Iron Works	New York	United States	For United States Navy.
19 August	Problem	Schooner	Messrs. William Bayley & Sons	Ipswich	United Kingdom	For Messrs. William & James Bayley.
20 August	Riva	Steamship	Messrs. John Laird & Sons	Birkenhead	United Kingdom	For Messrs. Jardine, Mathieson & Co.
20 August	Sidon	Steamship	Messrs. William Denny & Bros.	Dumbarton	United Kingdom	For Cunard Line.
21 August	Perseus	Camelion-class sloop		Pembroke Dockyard	United Kingdom	For Royal Navy.
21 August	Victoire	Frigate		Lorient	France	For French Navy.
22 August	Ida	Steamship	Messrs. Palmer Bros	Jarrow	United Kingdom	For Galway Mail Packet Company.
22 August	Salamander	Drache-class ironclad	Stabilimento Tecnico Triestino	Trieste	Austria	For Austrian Navy.
23 August	Erin	Steamship	Messrs. Blackwood & Gordon	Port Glasgow	United Kingdom	For Citizen Rivers Steamers Company (Limited).
23 August	Hansa	Steamship	Messrs. Caird & Co.	Greenock	United Kingdom	For Norddeutscher Lloyd.
27 August	Seneca	Unadilla-class gunboat	Jeremiah Simonson	New York	United States	For United States Navy.
29 August	Phœnix	Steamship	Messrs. James Henderson & Sons	Renfrew	United Kingdom	For Danish General Steam Navigation Company.
August	Andalusia	Steamship	J. G. Laurie	Glasgow	United Kingdom	For private owner.
August	Bristolian	Full-rigged ship	Messrs. J. & S. W. Olive	Carleton	(United Kingdom of Great Britain and Ireland) Colony of New Brunswick	For private owner.
August	Caprera	Merchantman	W. Ratcliffe	Sunderland	United Kingdom	For William Bedford.
August	Morpeth	Paddle steamer	Messrs. Mitchell's	Newcastle upon Tyne	United Kingdom	For Hunter River New Steam Navigation Company.
August	Sémiramis	Frigate		Rochefort	France	For French Navy.
1 September	Sagamore	Unadilla-class gunboat	Reaney, Son & Archbold	Boston, Massachusetts	United States	For United States Navy.
3 September	The Queen of the Fleet	Schooner	Messrs. D. A. Fullarton & Co.	Ayr	United Kingdom	For John Ward.
7 September	Athens	Steamship	Messrs. Leslie & Co.	Newcastle upon Tyne	United Kingdom	For Greek and Oriental Steam Navigation Company.
7 September	Drache	Drache-class ironclad	Stabilimento Tecnico Triestino	Trieste	Austria	For Austrian Navy.
7 September	Emma	Schooner		Bristol	United Kingdom	For private owner.
7 September	Jessie Knowles	Lifeboat		Southport	United Kingdom	For Royal National Lifeboat Institution.
7 September	Pladda	Steamship	Messrs. Blackwood & Sons	Port Glasgow	United Kingdom	For Clyde Shipping Company.
7 September	Undine	Steamship	Messrs. Thomas Wingate & Co.	Whiteinch	United Kingdom	For Douglas Lapraik and others.
10 September	Alpha	Pilot cutter	Read	Ipswich	United Kingdom	For Southwold Pilots.
11 September	Kearsarge	Mohican-class sloop		Portsmouth Navy Yard	United States	For United States Navy.
14 September	Chippewa	Unadilla-class gunboat	Webb & Bell	New York	United States	For United States Navy.
14 September	Winona	Unadilla-class gunboat	C. & R. Poillon	New York	United States	For United States Navy.
16 September	Queensland	Paddle Steamer	Messrs. Barclay, Curle & Co.	Stobcross	United Kingdom	For Queensland Steam Navigation Co.
17 September	Era	Steamship	Messrs. Palmer Bros.	Jarrow	United Kingdom	For Saint Petersburg Co.
18 September	Dmitri Donskoi	Frigate		Saint Petersburg	Russia	For Imperial Russian Navy.
19 September	Queen	Steamship		Glasgow	United Kingdom	For Aberdeen, Leith & Clyde Shipping Co.
19 September	Resolución	Screw frigate	Reales Astilleros de Esteiro	Ferrol	Spain	For Spanish Navy.
19 September	Unas	Barque	Messrs. Cox & Son	Bideford	United Kingdom	For Messrs. Bath.
21 September	Alexander Nevsky	Frigate	Okhtinskaya Shipyard	Saint Petersburg	Russia	For Imperial Russian Navy.
21 September	Express	Paddle steamer	Messrs. J. & G. Thomson	Govan	United Kingdom	For Messrs. Lyall, Still & Co.
21 September	Huron	Unadilla-class gunboat	Paul Curtis	Boston, Massachusetts	United States	For United States Navy.
21 September	Scotia	Steamship	Messrs. Gourlay, Brothers & Co.	Dundee	United Kingdom	For Dundee, Perth, and London Shipping Company.
23 September	Darius	Barque	John Robinson	Sunderland	United Kingdom	For Jobling & Co.
24 September	Industry	Merchantman	G. Short	Sunderland	United Kingdom	For R. Ness.
25 September	Pioneer	Steamship	Messrs. Stothert & Marten	Bristol	United Kingdom	For Weaver Navigation Trustees.
27 September	Opyt	Gunboat	Carr and MacPherson	Saint Petersburg	Russia	For Imperial Russian Navy.
September	Colleen Bawn	Clipper	Messrs. A. Hall & Co.	Aberdeen	United Kingdom	For private owner.
September	Europa	Brig			(United Kingdom of Great Britain and Ireland) Colony of Prince Edward Island	For private owner.
September	Harry Clasper	Steamship	Messrs. John Rogerson & Co.	Newcastle upon Tyne	United Kingdom	For private owner.
September	Matilda	Barque	William Briggs & Son	Sunderland	United Kingdom	For Hankey & Co.
September	Patrocinio	Frigate			Spain	For Spanish Navy.
September	San Giovanni	Corvette		Toulon	France	For Regia Marina, originally launched in 1849 and converted to screw power in 1861–1862
September	Varuna	Steamship	Mallory Yard	Mystic, Connecticut	United States	For private owner.
September	Wiepo	Corvette		Nicholaieff	Russia	For Imperial Russian Navy.
September	Wolu	Corvette		Nicholaieff	Spain	For Imperial Russian Navy.
September	Wolu	Corvette		Nicholaieff	Russia	For Imperial Russian Navy.
1 October	Formidabile	Formidabile-class ironclad	Société Nouvelle des Forges et Chantiers de la Méditerranée	La Seyne	France	For Regia Marina.
1 October	Itasca	Unadilla-class gunboat	Hillman & Streaker	Philadelphia, Pennsylvania	United States	For United States Navy.
3 October	Pinola	Unadilla-class gunboat	J. J. Abrahams	Baltimore, Maryland	United States	For United States Navy.
4 October	Nuestra Señora del Carmén	Screw frigate	Arsenal de Cartagena	Cartagena	Spain	For Spanish Navy.
4 October	Henrietta	Brig	Messrs. R. Steele & Co.	Greenock	United Kingdom	For private owner.
4 October	Physician	Schooner	Owen Roberts	Pwllheli	United Kingdom	For private owner.
5 October	Chocura	Unadilla-class gunboat	Curtis & Tilden	Boston, Massachusetts	United States	For United States Navy.
5 October	Kennebec	Unadilla-class gunboat	G. W. Lawrence	Thomaston, Maine	United States	For United States Navy.
5 October	Orient	Steamship	John Laird	Birkenhead	United Kingdom	For F. Clint.
5 October	Owasco	Unadilla-class gunboat	Charles Mallory	Mystic, Connecticut	United States	For United States Navy.
8 October	Askalon	Steamship	Messrs. Scott & Co.	Cartsdyke	United Kingdom	For private owner.
8 October	China	Steamship	Messrs. Napier & Sons	Govan	United Kingdom	For Cunard Line.
9 October	Kineo	Unadilla-class gunboat		Portland, Maine	United States	For United States Navy.
10 October	Wachusett	Mohican-class sloop		Boston Navy Yard	United States	For United States Navy.
11 October	China	Steamship	Messrs. Napier & Sons	Govan	United Kingdom	For Cunard Line.
12 October	Baron DeKalb	Ironclad	James B. Eads	Carondelet, Missouri	United Kingdom	For United States Navy.
12 October	Katahdin	Unadilla-class gunboat	Larrabee & Allen	Bath, Maine	United States	For United States Navy.
15 October	Sciota	Unadilla-class gunboat	Jacob Birely	Philadelphia, Pennsylvania	United States	For United States Navy.
15 October	Vesper	Schooner	Messrs. Stephen & Forbes	Peterhead	United Kingdom	For Peterhead and London Shipping Company.
16 October	Marblehead	Unadilla-class gunboat	George W. Jackman Jr.	Newburyport, Massachusetts	United States	For United States Navy.
17 October	Esmeralda	Fishing trawler	John Barter	Brixham	United Kingdom	For W. J. Hart.
17 October	Shearwater	Rosario-class sloop		Pembroke Dockyard	United Kingdom	For Royal Navy.
18 October	Nuestra Señora del Triunfo	Lealtad-class screw frigate	Arsenal de La Carraca	San Fernando	Spain	For Spanish Navy.
19 October	Atlas	Steamship	James Laing	Sunderland	United Kingdom	For E. T. Gourley.
19 October	Eleanor	Barque	William Briggs & Son	Sunderland	United Kingdom	For J. Shepherd.
19 October	Prince Pierre	Steamship	Messrs. Scott & Co.	Cartsdyke	United Kingdom	For private owner.
21 October	Cayuga	Unadilla-class gunboat	S. Gildersleeve & Sons	Portland, Connecticut	United States	For United States Navy.
21 October	Kanawha	Unadilla-class gunboat	G. B. & W. H. Goodspeed	East Haddam, Connecticut	United States	For United States Navy.
22 October	Morocco	Steamship	Messrs. William Denny & Bros.	Dumbarton	United Kingdom	For Messrs Burns & McIver.
23 October	Maria	Schooner	Messrs. Menzies & Co.	Granton	United Kingdom	For Messrs. Andrews & Banks.
24 October	Catherine and Mary	Sloop	McLea	Rothesay	United Kingdom	For Robert Johnston.
26 October	Georgina	Schooner	Robert Jones	Voryd	United Kingdom	For Messrs. Pennington & Co.
October	Aroostook	Unadilla-class gunboat	N. L. Thompson	Kennebunk, Maine	United States	For United States Navy.
October	Carolina	Barque		Quebec	(United Kingdom of Great Britain and Ireland) Province of Canada	For private owner.
October	Carondelet	City-class ironclad	James Eads & Co.	Carondelet, Missouri	United States	For United States Navy.
October	Estella	Steamboat	W. Fletcher	Burscough	United Kingdom	For private owner.
October	Louisville	City-class ironclad	James Buchanan Eads	St. Louis, Missouri	United States	For United States Navy.
October	Mound City	City-class ironclad			United States	For United States Navy.
October	Panther	Steamship	Brownlow & Lumsden	Hull	United Kingdom	For William B. Brownlow and others.
October	Pittsburgh	City-class ironclad	James B. Eads	Mound City, Illinois	United States	For United States Navy.
October	Triumfo	Frigate			Spain	For Spanish Navy.
October	Viola	Clipper	P. Brunette & Sons	Quebec	(United Kingdom of Great Britain and Ireland) Province of Canada	For private owner.
2 November	Orchid	Barque	Messrs. Charles Hill & Sons	Bristol	United Kingdom	For Messrs. T. Daniel & Co.
4 November	Annie Comrie	Barque	J. H. Watson	Sunderland	United Kingdom	For J. Gray.
5 November	Aquilae	Snow	W. Pile Jr.	Sunderland	United Kingdom	For S. Wright Kelso.
5 November	David Begg	Full-rigged ship	Messrs. William Simons & Co.	Renfrew	United Kingdom	For private owner.
5 November	Oasis	East Indiaman	Messrs. Josiah Jones, Quiggan & Co.	Liverpool	United Kingdom	For private owner.
5 November	Wave Queen	East Indiaman	Messrs. A. Stephen & Sons	Kelvinghaugh	United Kingdom	For John H. Watt.
16 November	Investigator	Survey vessel		Deptford Dockyard	United Kingdom	For Royal Navy.
16 November	Miami	Gunboat		Philadelphia Navy Yard	United States	For United States Navy.
16 November	Ossipee	Sloop-of-war		Portsmouth Navy Yard	United States	For United States Navy.
18 November	Orange Grove	Barque	Messrs. Barclay, Curle & Co.	Whiteinch	United Kingdom	For Mungo Campbell Jr.
18 November	Research	Full-rigged ship	John Richards	Yarmouth	(United Kingdom of Great Britain and Ireland) Colony of Nova Scotia	For Thomas Killam.
19 November	Africa	Sloop-of-war	Arsenal de la Carraca	San Fernando	Spain	For Spanish Navy.
19 November	Colonia	Steamship	Messrs. H. M. Lawrence & Co.	Liverpool	United Kingdom	For Messrs. Drabble Bros.
19 November	Dalmatian	Cargo ship	E. J. Harland	Belfast	United Kingdom	For J. Bibby & Sons.
19 November	Jane and Ann	Schooner	Thomas Williams	Caernarfon	United Kingdom	For private owner.
19 November	Paraguayri	Steamship	Messrs. J. & A. Blyth		United Kingdom	For Paraguayan Government.
19 November	Penobscot	Unadilla-class gunboat			United States	For United States Navy.
19 November	Vad Ras	Sloop-of-war	Arsenal de la Carraca	San Fernando	Spain	For Spanish Navy.
20 November	Housatonic	Ossipee-class sloop		Boston Navy Yard	United States	For United States Navy.
20 November	Oneida	Mohican-class sloop		New York Navy Yard	United States	For United States Navy.
20 November	Rhos	Merchantman	Roberts	Rhuddlan	United Kingdom	For D. Jones.
26 November	Maratanza	Paddle steamer		Boston Navy Yard	United States	For United States Navy.
30 November	Lord Lyndhurst	Full-rigged ship	Messrs. Thomas Vernon & Co.	Liverpool	United Kingdom	For Messrs. Liston, Young, & Co.
30 November	Sebago	Gunboat		Portsmouth Navy Yard	United States	For United States Navy.
November	Bonaventure	Barque		Quebec	(United Kingdom of Great Britain and Ireland) Province of Canada	For private owner.
November	City of London	Barque	G. W. & W. J. Hall	Sunderland	United Kingdom	For T. Todd.
November	Jane	Brig		St. Mary's	(United Kingdom of Great Britain and Ireland) Colony of Nova Scotia	For private owner.
November	Onega	Barque		Saint John	(United Kingdom of Great Britain and Ireland) Colony of New Brunswick	For private owner.
November	Tantivy	Schooner	Messrs. Harvey & Son	Ipswich	United Kingdom	For Mr. Pope.
1 December	Napier	Schooner			Portugal	For Portuguese Navy.
1 December	Sa da Bandiera	Sloop-of-war			Portugal	For Portuguese Navy.
2 December	Gresham	Full-rigged ship	G. Peverall	Sunderland	United Kingdom	For Teighe & Co.
4 December	Macgregor Laird	Steamship		River Clyde	United Kingdom	For African Steam Company.
4 December	Ardèche	Ardèche-class horse transport	Chantiers Arman	Bordeaux	France	For French Navy.
5 December	Jessie Brown	Steamship	Messrs. Barclay, Curle & Co.	Stobcross	United Kingdom	For Ballycastle Iron Mining Company.
7 December	Octorara	Paddle steamer		Brooklyn Navy Yard	United States	For United States Navy.
9 December	Sovereign	Barque	Denniston & Pearson	Sunderland	United Kingdom	For Mr. Dale.
10 December	Mahaska	Paddle steamer		Portsmouth Navy Yard	United States	For United States Navy.
11 December	Allier	Ardèche-class horse transport	Ernest Gouin	Nantes	France	For French Navy.
14 December	Royalist	Rosario-class sloop		Devonport Dockyard	United Kingdom	For Royal Navy.
17 December	Cortes	Steamship	Messrs. J. & G. Thompson	Govan	United Kingdom	For Spanish Steam Navigation Company.
18 December	Rosalind	Schooner	G. W. Hall	Sunderland	United Kingdom	For Mr. Robson Jr.
28 December	Magicienne	Frigate		Toulon	France	For French Navy.
31 December	Colon	Steamship	Messrs. Caird & Co.	Greenock	United Kingdom	For Spanish Navigation Co.
31 December	Mary	Steam lighter	Robert Wilson	Port Downie	United Kingdom	For Bonnybridge Tile Works.
31 December	Soane	Steamship	Messrs. J. Henderson & Co.	Renfrew	United Kingdom	For Oriental Inland Steam Company.
December	Alice Richardson	Merchantman	Gray & Young	Sunderland	United Kingdom	For Rehrdan & Co.
December	Annette	Steamship			United Kingdom	For private owner.
December	Colon	Steamship	Messrs. Caird & Co.	Glasgow	United Kingdom	For Spanish Steam Navigation Company.
December	Cortes	Steamship	Messrs. J. & G. Thompson	Govan	United Kingdom	For Spanish Steam Navigation Company.
December	Livorno	Steamship	Messrs. Charles Connel & Co.	Overnewton	United Kingdom	For Messrs. Handysides & Henderson.
December	Oreto	Steamship	W. C. Miller	Liverpool	United Kingdom	For Messrs. Fawcett, Preston & Co.
December	Volunteer	Barque		Saint John	(United Kingdom of Great Britain and Ireland) Colony of New Brunswick	For private owner.
Unknown date	Adriatic	Full-rigged ship	Curtis & Tilden	Boston, Massachusetts	United States	For Elisha E. Morgan, Richard Moore & Mr. Riley.
Unknown date	Ajax	Merchantman	James Laing	Sunderland	United Kingdom	For E. T. Gourley & Co.
Unknown date	A. C. Powell	Paddle tug		Syracuse, New York	United States	For private owner.
Unknown date	Alice	Schooner	Brundrit & Whiteway	Runcorn	United Kingdom	For private owner.
Unknown date	Allerston	Brig	B. Hodgson	Sunderland	United Kingdom	For Messrs. Dukes.
Unknown date	Anne Wood	Merchantman	G. W. Hall	Sunderland	United Kingdom	For Wood & Co.
Unknown date	Antelope	Steamship	J. L. Wolverton	Newport, Michigan	United States	For L. S. Bowtell.
Unknown date	Balcombe	Merchantman	Austin & Mills	Sunderland	United Kingdom	For T. Hankey.
Unknown date	Belmont	Merchantman		Sunderland	United Kingdom	For William Brown.
Unknown date	Bengairn	Merchantman	B. Hodgson	Sunderland	United Kingdom	For Rae & Co.
Unknown date	Ben Lomond	Merchantman	J. Barkes	Sunderland	United Kingdom	For J. Morrison.
Unknown date	Bermuda	Steamship	Pearse & Lockwood	Stockton-on-Tees	United Kingdom	For Edwin Haigh.
Unknown date	Bermuda	Steamship	Messrs. Richardson & Duck	Stockton on Tees	United Kingdom	For private owner.
Unknown date	Bertie	Smack	Brundrit & Whiteway	Runcorn	United Kingdom	For Brundrit & Whiteway.
Unknown date	Bessy	Yacht	Mr. Harvey	Wivenhoe	United Kingdom	For J. H. Hedge.
Unknown date	Bombay	Merchantman	James Laing	Sunderland	United Kingdom	For Cowie & Co.
Unknown date	Brothers	Merchantman	A. Scott	Sunderland	United Kingdom	For Scott & Sons.
Unknown date	Cairo	City-class ironclad	James Eads & Co.	Mound City, Illinois	United States	For United States Navy.
Unknown date	Caldera	Barque	W. Pile	Sunderland	United Kingdom	For Henry J. Madge.
Unknown date	Cambay	Barque	T. & J. Brocklebank	Whitehaven	United Kingdom	For T. & R. Brocklebank.
Unknown date	Cape City	Merchantman	W. Pile	Sunderland	United Kingdom	For Henry Ellis.
Unknown date	Cathay	Merchantman	Taylor & Scouter	Sunderland	United Kingdom	For J. Gibbon.
Unknown date	Cincinnati	City-class ironclad	James Eads	St. Louis, Missouri	United States	For United States Navy.
Unknown date	Clifton	Paddle steamer		Brooklyn, New York	United States	For private owner.
Unknown date	Clintonia	Barque	N. Stothard	Sunderland	United Kingdom	For J. Robinson.
Unknown date	Colleen Bawn	Merchantman	James Robinson	Sunderland	United Kingdom	For J. Smith.
Unknown date	Colonist	Schooner	Messrs. Denny & Rankine	Dumbarton	United Kingdom	For John Phillips.
Unknown date	Connecticut	Paddle steamer	William Webb	New York	United States	For private owner.
Unknown date	Coral Isle	Merchantman	W. Naizby	Sunderland	United Kingdom	For Hick & Co.
Unknown date	Corrinne	Merchantman	W. Pickersgill	Sunderland	United Kingdom	For Hall Bros.
Unknown date	Cresswell	Merchantman	Todd & Brown	Sunderland	United Kingdom	For Mr. Eltringham.
Unknown date	Cygnet	Snow	Robert Thompson	Sunderland	United Kingdom	For Walker & Co.
Unknown date	Daybreak	Merchantman	Rawson & Watson	Sunderland	United Kingdom	For Coxon & Co.
Unknown date	Dolphin	Cutter	Inman	Lymington	United Kingdom	For Royal Navy.
Unknown date	Dovercourt	Clipper	Vaux	Harwich	United Kingdom	For private owner.
Unknown date	Dunphallie Castle	Merchantman	James Laing	Sunderland	United Kingdom	For Duncan Dunbar.
Unknown date	Edenton	Paddle steamer	Harlan & Hollingsworth	Wilmington, Delaware	United States	For Albemarle Steam Packet Company.
Unknown date	Eliza Blanche	Merchantman	W. Pile	Sunderland	United Kingdom	For Dalgetty and others.
Unknown date	Ellen Mary	Merchantman	W. Taylor	Sunderland	United Kingdom	For Mr. Beaumont.
Unknown date	Ellen & Lucy	Merchantman	L. Wheatley	Sunderland	United Kingdom	For Mr. Goddard.
Unknown date	Erinagh	Merchantman	Todd & Brown	Sunderland	United Kingdom	For Ewing & Co.
Unknown date	Flambeau	Steamship	Lawrence & Foulks	New York	United States	For private owner.
Unknown date	Florence	Barque	Peter Austin	Sunderland	United Kingdom	For Ord & Co.
Unknown date	Freedom	Merchantman	Robert Thompson	Sunderland	United Kingdom	For M. Robson.
Unknown date	Free Love	Schooner		Port Madoc	United Kingdom	For private owner.
Unknown date	Friar's Goose	Merchantman	John T. Alcock	Sunderland	United Kingdom	For private owner.
Unknown date	Glenaln	Merchantman	James Robinson	Sunderland	United Kingdom	For Mr. Rennison.
Unknown date	Glenaros	Merchantman	W. Pile	Sunderland	United Kingdom	For Adamson & Co.
Unknown date	Haswell	Merchantman	James Laing	Sunderland	United Kingdom	For Hugh Taylor & Co.
Unknown date	Helene	Brig		Stralsund	Prussia	For private owner.
Unknown date	Henry Brinker	Steamship		Brooklyn, New York	United States	For Henry Brinker.
Unknown date	Hetzel	Paddle steamer		Baltimore, Maryland	United States	For United States Coast Survey.
Unknown date	Hibernia	Steamship	Messrs. Palmer, Bros., & Co.	Jarrow	United Kingdom	For Atlantic Royal Mail Steamship Navigation Company.
Unknown date	Hjejlen	Paddle steamer	Baumgarten & Burmeister	Copenhagen	Denmark	For Michael Drewsen.
Unknown date	Honduras	Paddle steamer		New York	United States	For Simeon Ackerman.
Unknown date	Hopeful	Fishing trawler	R. S. Abbott & Co.	Hull	United Kingdom	For James Westcott Jr.
Unknown date	Ibis	Merchantman	G. Peverall	Sunderland	United Kingdom	For Lucas & Co.
Unknown date	Indus	Steamship		Kurrachee	(United Kingdom of Great Britain and Ireland) India	For Oriental Inland Steam Company.
Unknown date	Ione	Merchantman	W. Naizby	Sunderland	United Kingdom	For Ritson & Co.
Unknown date	Isaac Smith	Steamship	Lawrence & Foulks	New York	United States	For E. J. Hamilton.
Unknown date	Isabella	Brig	George Bartram & Sons	Sunderland	United Kingdom	For Dawson & Co.
Unknown date	Isabella Thompson	Schooner		Saint John	(United Kingdom of Great Britain and Ireland) Colony of New Brunswick	For private owner.
Unknown date	J. A. Cotton	Paddle steamer		Jeffersonville, Indiana	United States	For private owner.
Unknown date	Jane	Merchantman	John T. Alcock	Sunderland	United Kingdom	For Peacock & Co.
Unknown date	Jane	Merchantman	G. Peverall	Sunderland	United Kingdom	For Mr. Brodie.
Unknown date	Jesmond	Merchantman	builder	Sunderland	United Kingdom	For T. Reay.
Unknown date	Josephine	Merchantman	William Doxford	Sunderland	United Kingdom	For Ray & Sons.
Unknown date	Kirkwood	Merchantman	J. Haswell	Sunderland	United Kingdom	For W. Kirkwood.
Unknown date	Lady Havelock	Merchantman	James Laing	Sunderland	United Kingdom	For J. Smurthwaite et al.
Unknown date	Laura	Merchantman	Sykes & Co.	Sunderland	United Kingdom	For Green & Co.
Unknown date	Lavinia Logan	Sternwheeler		Parkersburg, Virginia	United States	For private owner.
Unknown date	Letitia	Merchantman	S. Metcalf	Sunderland	United Kingdom	For Mr. Griffin.
Unknown date	Letitia	Merchantman	W. Barclay	Sunderland	United Kingdom	For A. Thompson.
Unknown date	Lollard	Merchantman	Todd & Brown	Sunderland	United Kingdom	For J. Candlish.
Unknown date	Lurline	Merchantman	J. Robinson	Sunderland	United Kingdom	For Messrs. Croptons.
Unknown date	Margaret Davis	Merchantman	James Hardie	Sunderland	United Kingdom	For F. Davies.
Unknown date	Maria	Sternwheeler		Cincinnati, Ohio	United States	For private owner.
Unknown date	Maritana	Snow	Robert Thompson Jr.	Sunderland	United Kingdom	For J. & W. Hill.
Unknown date	Mary Ada	Merchantman	William Doxford	Sunderland	United Kingdom	For Anderson & Co.
Unknown date	Mary Ann	Merchantman	J. Peddie	Pallion	United Kingdom	For Mr Streugham.
Unknown date	Mary Ann	Brig	W. Adamson	Sunderland	United Kingdom	For W. Adamson.
Unknowndate	Mary Fry	Merchantman			United Kingdom	For private owner.
Unknown date	Matfen	Merchantman	Robert Pace	Sunderland	United Kingdom	For Gregory & Co.
Unknown date	Meg	Merchantman	James Hardie	Sunderland	United Kingdom	For Mr. Hargreave.
Unknown date	Mercedita	Steamship		Brooklyn, New York	United States	For J. C. Jewett & Co.
Unknown date	Neptune	Paddle steamer	Robert Napier and Sons	Govan	United Kingdom	For James S. Napier & James McIntyre.
Unknown date	Norwich	Steamship		Norwich, Connecticut	United States	For J. M. Huntington & Co.
Unknown date	Natal	Barque			United Kingdom	For private owner.
Unknown date	Neva	Merchantman	B. Hodgson	Sunderland	United Kingdom	For Humble & Co.
Unknown date	Newburn	Merchantman	James Laing	Sunderland	United Kingdom	For Fenwick & Co.
Unknown date	Nisa	Smack	Stanger	Stromness	United Kingdom	For Mr. Tulloch.
Unknown date	North Eastern	Steamship		Newcastle upon Tyne	United Kingdom	For private owner.
Unknown date	Norwegian	Steamship	Messrs. William Denny & Bros.	Dumbarton	United Kingdom	For private owner.
Unknown date	Oban	Merchantman	B. & J. Gardner	Sunderland	United Kingdom	For Craven & Co.
Unknown date	Octa	Steamship	Earle's Shipbuilding	Hull	United Kingdom	For Norwood C. M. & Co.
Unknown date	Oleander	Merchantman	J. Haswell	Sunderland	United Kingdom	For Philip Patmore.
Unknown date	Ottawa	Unadilla-class gunboat	Jacob Aaron Westervelt	New York	United States	For United States Navy.
Unknown date	Palermo	Cargo ship	Charles Connell & Co Ltd	Glasgow	United Kingdom	For private owner.
Unknown date	Paquete de Maule	Paddle steamer	Lawrence & Foulks	Williamsburg, New York	United States	For G. K. Stevenson & Co.
Unknown date	Parthenon	Merchantman	T. R. Oswald	Sunderland	United Kingdom	For E. Gourley.
Unknown date	Pearl	Merchantman	E. Potts	Sunderland	United Kingdom	For J. Wilson.
Unknown date	Pembina	Unadilla-class gunboat	Thomas Stack	Williamsburg, New York	United States	For United States Navy.
Unknown date	Pet	Steamship		Dumbarton	United Kingdom	For private owner.
Unknown date	Phantom	Schooner	J. Mitchell	Nagasaki	Japan	For private owner.
Unknown date	Plato	Barque	Austin & Mills	Sunderland	United Kingdom	For Mills & Co.
Unknown date	Polina	Merchantman	Rawson & Watson	Sunderland	United Kingdom	For J. Patton.
Unknown date	Magicien	Aviso		La Seyne	France	For French Navy.
Unknown date	Prince Alfred	Merchantman	A. Simer	Sunderland	United Kingdom	For T. Smith.
Unknown date	Quercus	Merchantman	W. Pile	Sunderland	United Kingdom	For R. Lliff.
Unknown date	Rescue	Tug	Harlan & Hollingsworth	Wilmington, Delaware	United States	For Harlan & Hollingsworth.
Unknown date	Restless	Tug		St. Louis, Missouri	United States	For private owner.
Unknown date	Robert Cleugh	Merchantman	B. & J. Gardner	Sunderland	United Kingdom	For R. Cleugh.
Unknown date	Rondinella	Merchantman	G. Bartram	Sunderland	United Kingdom	For G. Bartram.
Unknown date	Rondinella	Merchantman	Robert Thompson	Sunderland	United Kingdom	For William Nicholson & Co.
Unknown date	Rowena	Merchantman	W. Pickersgill	Sunderland	United Kingdom	For W. Abbay.
Unknown date	Sampson	tug		New Haven, Missouri	United States	For private owner.
Unknown date	Samuel	Merchantman	Austin & Mills	Sunderland	United Kingdom	For S. & J. Pegg.
Unknown date	San Jose	Barque	W. Pickersgill	Sunderland	United Kingdom	For Mr. Langridge.
Unknown date	Seafield	Clipper		Dundee	United Kingdom	For private owner.
Unknown date	Scout	Cutter	Inman	Lymington	United Kingdom	For Royal Navy.
Unknown date	Southwick	Steamship	James Laing	Sunderland	United Kingdom	For W. Gray & Co.
Unknown date	Sovereign of India	Merchantman	G. Peverall	Sunderland	United Kingdom	For Castle & Co.
Unknown date	Speedwell	Tug	W. C. Miller	Liverpool	United Kingdom	For Liverpool Steam-tug Company.
Unknown date	Spring	Merchantman	J. Lister	Sunderland	United Kingdom	For J. Harper.
Unknown date	Stepping Stones	Ferry		New York	United States	For private owner.
Unknown date	Stettin	Steamship		Sunderland	United Kingdom	For private owner.
Unknown date	Stettin	Merchantman	W. Pile	Sunderland	United Kingdom	For Zacharia C. Pearson.
Unknown date	Susannah	Humber Keel			United Kingdom	For William G. England.
Unknown date	Sylphide	Merchantman	J. Denniston	Sunderland	United Kingdom	For Scurfield & Co.
Unknown date	Thomas Dryden	Merchantman	J. Davison	Sunderland	United Kingdom	For J. Dryden.
Unknown date	Thomas & Mary	Snow	Peter Austin	Sunderland	United Kingdom	For T. Thompson.
Unknown date	Thrush	Brig	R. H. Potts & Bros.	Sunderland	United Kingdom	For Potts Bros.
Unknown date	Tientsin	Barque	W. Pile	Sunderland	United Kingdom	For J. Hay.
Unknown date	Troubadour	Barque		Miramichi	(United Kingdom of Great Britain and Ireland) Province of Canada	For private owner.
Unknown date	Tuscarora	Paddle steamer			United Kingdom	For Southern Steamship Company.
Unknown date	Vanquisher	Merchantman	Green & Richardson	Sunderland	United Kingdom	For Mr. Farrow Jr.
Unknown date	Vedra	Merchantman	Peter Austin	Sunderland	United Kingdom	For Allison Whitefield & Co.
Unknown date	Vencedora	Screw corvette	Arsenal de Cartagena	Cartagena	Spain	For Spanish Navy.
Unknown date	Victoria	Merchantman		Sunderland	United Kingdom	For private owner.
Unknown date	Volunteer	Merchantman	J. Barkes	Sunderland	United Kingdom	For T. Tiffin.
Unknown date	Whitehead	Paddle steamer		New Brunswick, New Jersey	United States	For private owner.
Unknown date	Why Not	Yacht	Hatchter, or Thatcher	Southampton	United Kingdom	For C. J. Gray.
Unknown date	William & Catherine	Merchantman	Robert Thompson	Sunderland	United Kingdom	For D. Park.
Unknown date	Wiliam & Jane	Merchantman	Peter Austin	Sunderland	United Kingdom	For W. Kish.
Unknown date	William Balls	Merchantman	L. Wheatley	Sunderland	United Kingdom	For W. Balls.
Unknown date	William Walker	Brig	J. & J. Brown	Sunderland	United Kingdom	For E. Bassett.
Unknown date	Winsome	Schooner	G. W. Hall	Sunderland	United Kingdom	For Matthew Robson Jr.
Unknown date	Wissahickon	Unadilla-class gunboat		Philadelphia, Pennsylvania	United States	For United States Navy.
Unknown date	Zouave	Steamship		Albany, New York	United States	For private owner.
