= List of shipwrecks in April 1864 =

The list of shipwrecks in April 1864 includes ships sunk, foundered, grounded, or otherwise lost during April 1864.

== 1 April ==
List of shipwrecks: 1 April 1864
Ship	State	Description
Arlington	United States	The barque was wrecked on North Bimini, Bahamas. She was on a voyage from Portland, Maine to Havana, Cuba.
Fair Haven	United States	The 474-ton screw steamer was stranded at Cape Henry, Virginia.
Key West No. 4	United States	The sternwheel paddle steamer struck a snag and sank in the Arkansas River at Paw Paw Landing, 20 nautical miles (37 km) downstream of Little Rock, Arkansas.
Maple Leaf	United States Army	American Civil War: The 508-ton sidewheel paddle steamer, a transport carrying baggage of the 13th Indiana Infantry Regiment, 112th New York Infantry Regiment, and 169th New York Infantry Regiment (all Union Army), struck a Confederate mine in the St. Johns River at McIntosh's Point opposite Doctors Lake 15 nautical miles (28 km) upstream of Jacksonville, Florida. Confederate States of America and sank with the loss of four lives, leaving her funnels and upper deck above water. A company of the 1st Georgia Infantry Regiment and a section of the Florida Light Artillery (both Confederate States Army) burned her funnels and upper deck on 2 April. She and her cargo were declared a total loss.
Tahiti	United States	The ship was wrecked on Harbour Island, Bahamas. She was on a voyage from New York to Havana, Cuba.
Zambezi	United Kingdom	The barque was wrecked on Bimini. She was on a voyage from Portland to Matanzas, Cuba.

== 2 April ==
List of shipwrecks: 2 April 1864
Ship	State	Description
Hoang Ho	United Kingdom	The ship was driven ashore in the Saltee Islands, County Wexford. She was on a voyage from Greenock, Renfrewshire to Singapore, Straits Settlements and Penang, Malaya. She was later refloated and put in to Liverpool, Lancashire.
Jackson	United States	The 84-ton sternwheel paddle steamer burned at New Orleans, Louisiana.
Rosalie Camilla	France	The schooner collided with another vessel and foundered in the North Sea off Hartlepool, County Durham. Her crew were rescued by the ketch Alma (United Kingdom). Rosalie Camilla was on a voyage from Sunderland, County Durham, United Kingdom to Marseille, Bouches-du-Rhône.

== 3 April ==
List of shipwrecks: 3 April 1864
Ship	State	Description
Brazilian	United Kingdom	The ship was driven ashore on Lady Isle, in the Firth of Clyde. She was on a voyage from Troon, Ayrshire to Copenhagen, Denmark. She was refloated and towed back to Troon.
Florence Nightingale	United Kingdom	The steamship was run down and sunk by the steamship Admiral (United Kingdom) 2 nautical miles (3.7 km) east south east of the Gunfleet Lightship ( Trinity House with the loss of two of her crew. Survivors were rescued by Admiral. Florence Nightingale was on a voyage from Newcastle upon Tyne, Northumberland to London.
HMS Magpie	Royal Navy	The Dapper-class gunboat was wrecked on the west coast of Ireland. All on board survived.
Ravenna	United Kingdom	The barque was driven ashore at Cape Henry, Virginia, Confederate States of America. She was on a voyage from Liverpool to Baltimore, Maryland, United States.

== 4 April ==
List of shipwrecks: 4 April 1864
Ship	State	Description
Maid of the Yare	United Kingdom	The ship was driven ashore at Lydd, Kent. She was on a voyage from Caen, Calvados to the River Tyne. She was refloated and resumed her voyage.
Matilda	Confederate States of America	The 390-register ton screw steamer ran aground and sank off Lundy Island, Devon, United Kingdom. All 31 people on board were rescued. She was on a voyage from Cardiff, Glamorgan, United Kingdom to Bermuda.
Zephyr	Sweden	The ship ran aground on the Longsand, in the North Sea off toe coast of Essex, United Kingdom. She was on a voyage from Gothenburg to Rio de Janeiro, Brazil. She was refloated with the assistance of five smacks and put in to Harwich, Essex.

== 5 April ==
List of shipwrecks: 5 April 1864
Ship	State	Description
Acorn	United Kingdom	The schooner was driven ashore in the Belfast Lough. She was refloated on 8 April and beached at Bangor, County Down in a severely damaged condition.
Appoline	United Kingdom	The ship ran aground in Granville Bay, Bermuda. She was later refloated and taken in to Saint Thomas, Virgin Islands, where she arrived on 8 May in a leaky condition.
Doris	United Kingdom	The brigantine was wrecked on the Dulas Rocks, on the coasts of Anglesey. Her crew were rescued. She was on a voyage from Liverpool, Lancashire to Zierikzee, Zeeland, Netherlands. She was towed in to Amlwch, Anglesey in a waterlogged condition on 9 April.
H. B. B.	United Kingdom	The lugger collided with Princess Victoria (United Kingdom) and sank off Corsewall Point, Wigtownshire. Her crew were rescued by Princess Victoria. H. B. B. was on a voyage from Troon, Ayrshire to Strangford, County Antrim.
Jo Jacques	United States	The 34-ton sternwheel paddle steamer sank in the Ohio River at Metropolis, after colliding with General Anderson (Flag unknown).
New Falls City	Confederate States of America	American Civil War: Confederate forces sank the 880-ton sidewheel paddle steamer as a blockship in the Red River of the South in Louisiana at the foot of Scopern's Cutoff, 1 nautical mile (1.9 km) upstream of Loggy Bayou.
Royal Stuart	United Kingdom	The ship was wrecked in the Torres Strait. She was on a voyage from Auckland, New Zealand to Madras, India.
Sultana	United Kingdom	The ship was driven ashore and wrecked 10 nautical miles (19 km) south of Barnegat, New Jersey, United States. Her crew were rescued. She was on a voyage from Newport, Monmouthshire to New York, United States.

== 6 April ==
List of shipwrecks: 6 April 1864
Ship	State	Description
Mynore	(United Kingdom of Great Britain and Ireland) New South Wales	The steamship was wrecked at Georges Head. All on board were rescued. She was on a voyage from Moruya to Sydney.
Priscilla	United Kingdom	The ship was lost in the Weser. Her crew were rescued. She was on a voyage from South Shields, County Durham to Bremerhaven.

== 7 April ==
List of shipwrecks: 7 April 1864
Ship	State	Description
Royal Tar	United Kingdom	The steamship was wrecked in Carmarthen Bay. She was on a voyage from Newport, Monmouthshire to Liverpool.
Thistle	United Kingdom	The brig ran aground on Seedy's Bank, off the coast of County Waterford.
Viceroy	(United Kingdom of Great Britain and Ireland) New South Wales	The brigantine collided with the steamship Wonga Wonga ( (United Kingdom of Great Britain and Ireland) New South Wales) and sank. Her crew were rescued.

== 8 April ==
List of shipwrecks: 8 April 1864
Ship	State	Description
Caledonia	United Kingdom	The steamship was wrecked on Spectacle Island, United States. She was on a voyage from Halifax, Nova Scotia, British North America to Bermuda.
Janet Cowan	United Kingdom	The ship was wrecked on St Kilda. Her crew survived. She was on a voyage from Calcutta, India to Dundee, Forfarshire.
Lily	United Kingdom	The oyster cutter collided with a brig and foundered in the English Channel 20 nautical miles (37 km) north of Fécamp, Seine-Inférieure. Her crew were rescued.
HMS Magpie	Royal Navy	The Dapper-class gunboat was wrecked in Galway Bay.
Star	United Kingdom	The ship was driven ashore in Luce Bay. She was on a voyage from Liverpool, Lancashire to Newcastle upon Tyne, Northumberland. She was refloated the next day and resumed her voyage.

== 9 April ==
List of shipwrecks: 9 April 1864
Ship	State	Description
Hero	United Kingdom	The ship sprang a leak and was beached at Montrose, Forfarshire. She was on a voyage from Middlesbrough, Yorkshire to the Firth of Tay.
Star	United Kingdom	The full-rigged ship was driven ashore in Drumor Bay. She was being towed from Liverpool, Lancashire to Troon, Ayrshire. She was refloated and towed in to Troon.
Windau	Russia	The ship was driven ashore at "Wiken", Sweden. She was on a voyage from Liverpool to Riga. She was refloated and resumed her voyage.

== 11 April ==
List of shipwrecks: 11 April 1864
Ship	State	Description
Belfast	United Kingdom	The ship departed from Liverpool, Lancashire for San Francisco, California, United States. No further trace, presumed foundered with the loss of all hands.
Cornelia	United Kingdom	The barque ran aground on the Pratas Shoal. She was on a voyage from Shanghai, China to New York, United States. She was refloated on 18 April with the assistance of the steamship Chanticleer (United Kingdom) and towed in to Hong Kong, where sher arrived on 22 April.
Dash	United Kingdom	The ship was wrecked on Cape Sable Island, Nova Scotia, British North America. Her crew were rescued. She was on a voyage from Cienfuegos, Cuba to Saint John's, Newfoundland, British North America.
Flora	United Kingdom	The ship was driven ashore at Lindisfarne, Northumberland. She was on a voyage from Middlesbrough, Yorkshire to Leith, Lothian. She was refloated on 14 April and taken in to Lindisfarne.
Garo	United Kingdom	The schooner ran aground in the River Tyne. She was on a voyage from Aberdeen to North Shields, Northumberland. She was refloated and taken in to North Shields.

== 12 April ==
List of shipwrecks: 12 April 1864
Ship	State	Description
Able Seaman	United Kingdom	The ship was holed by ice and sank in the Gulf of Saint Lawrence. Her crew took to boats; they were rescued on 17 April by the schooner Wide Awake ( (United Kingdom of Great Britain and Ireland) British North America). Able Seaman was on a voyage from London to Montreal, Province of Canada, British North America.
Adams	United States	American Civil War: The steamer, carrying a cargo of United States Army quartermaster′s stores and ammunition, collided with the steamer Chippewa (United States) and sank in the Arkansas River 20 nautical miles (37 km) downstream of Little Rock, Arkansas.
Honesty	United Kingdom	The Mersey Flat collided with the steamboat Wild Rose (United Kingdom and sank in the River Mersey.
La Crosse	United States	American Civil War: The 186-ton sternwheel or screw steamer burned at Egg Bend, Louisiana.

== 13 April ==
List of shipwrecks: 13 April 1864
Ship	State	Description
Air	United Kingdom	The schooner collided with the steamship John Liddel (United Kingdom) and sank in the Swin. Her crew were rescued. She was on a voyage from Sunderland, County Durham to London.
Dapper	(United Kingdom of Great Britain and Ireland) Jersey	The ship collided with City of Paris (United Kingdom) and sank in the English Channel off the coast of Cornwall. Her crew were rescued by a pilot cutter. She was on a voyage from Swansea, Glamorgan to Fécamp, Seine-Inférieure, France.
Rosina	Confederate States of America	American Civil War, Union blockade: The sloop was forced aground off San Luis Pass, Texas, by the armed screw steamer USS Virginia (United States Navy). She was set afire by United States Navy shelling on 15 April.

== 14 April ==
List of shipwrecks: 14 April 1864
Ship	State	Description
Enterprise	United Kingdom	The barque was run into by the schooner Joan and san in the River Thames with the loss of three of her crew. She was on a voyage from London to Saint Vincent.
Garland	United Kingdom	The ship ran aground on the Cross Sand, in the North Sea off the coast of Norfolk. She was on a voyage from Calcutta, India to Dundee, Forfarshire. She was refloated and taken in to Lowestoft, Suffolk in a leaky condition.
Renski Hoortjes	Netherlands	The ship struck rocks on the coast of Northumberland, United Kingdom and sank. She was on a voyage from Harlingen, Friesland to the River Tyne.
William and Catherine	United Kingdom	The ship was wrecked at Rilledge Point, Devon. She was on a voyage from Cardiff, Glamorgan to Ilfracombe, Devon.
Unidentified sloop	Confederate States of America	American Civil War: The sloop was captured and destroyed on the Nansemond River in Virginia by crew members of the gunboat Reno (United States Army) and troops of the 9th New Jersey Infantry Regiment (Union Army).

== 15 April ==
List of shipwrecks: 15 April 1864
Ship	State	Description
USS Eastport	United States Navy	American Civil War, Red River Campaign: The ironclad ram was sunk by a Confederate mine on the Red River of the South in Louisiana, Confederate States of America. She was destroyed on 26 April to prevent her capture by Confederate forces.
Emma	United Kingdom	The sealing ship, Captain Gavill, foundered in the Arctic Ocean off Jan Mayen, Norway (70°10′N 14°00′W). Her crew were rescued by the whaler Elise (Norway), Captain Gunnar.
Mantura	United Kingdom	The barque was driven ashore at St. Mawes Castle, Cornwall. She was on a voyage from Falmouth, Cornwall to Cork. She was refloated with the assistance of a tug.

== 16 April ==
List of shipwrecks: 16 April 1864
Ship	State	Description
General Hunter	United States Army	American Civil War: The transport struck a Confederate mine near Mandarin Point in the St. Johns River in the vicinity of Jacksonville, Florida, Confederate States of America, and sank with the loss of one life.

== 17 April ==
List of shipwrecks: 17 April 1864
Ship	State	Description
Lecompte	United States	The 250-ton sidewheel paddle steamer struck a snag and sank in the Red River of the South 10 nautical miles (19 km) upstream of Campti, Louisiana, Confederate States of America.

== 18 April ==
List of shipwrecks: 18 April 1864
Ship	State	Description
Alma	Prussia	The ship was scuttled in the Atlantic Ocean 75 nautical miles (139 km) west of the Isles of Scilly, United Kingdom. Her fourteen crew were rescued by the full-rigged ship Helene (United Kingdom). Alma was on a voyage from Antwerp, Belgium to New York, United States.
Bombshell	United States Army	American Civil War: The armed transport tug was sunk by Confederate artillery batteries in North Carolina, either in Albemarle Sound or on the Roanoke River at a dock in Plymouth, North Carolina, Confederate States of America (sources disagree). The Confederates raised and repaired her and placed in service as the gunboat CSS Bombshell. Union forces recaptured her on 5 May 1864.
Buston Vale	United Kingdom	The ship ran aground at Kurrachee, India. She was on a voyage from Kurrachee to London. She was refloated'.
Good Hope	Confederate States of America	American Civil War, Union blockade: Carrying a cargo of salt and dry goods, the ca. 150-ton schooner was captured and burned at the mouth of the Homosassa River in Florida by the schooner USS Fox (United States Navy).
Vigilante	France	The ship sank off the Minquiers, Channel Islands. She was on a voyage from Saint-Malo, Ille-et-Vilaine to Jersey, Channel Islands.

== 19 April ==
List of shipwrecks: 19 April 1864
Ship	State	Description
Corea	United Kingdom	The barque ran aground on Taylor's Bank, in Liverpool Bay. She was on a voyage from Laguna to Liverpool, Lancashire and Saint Petersburg, Russia. She was refloated the next day and towed in to Liverpool.
Falls City	United States	The 183-ton sternwheel paddle steamer foundered in Loggy Bayou in Louisiana, Confederate States of America.
HMS Flamer	Royal Navy	The ship was driven ashore on the coast of China. Subsequently refloated, repaired and returned to service.
Samuel Dunning	United Kingdom	The full-rigged ship foundered with the loss of 25 her 31 crew. Survivors were rescued by Chariot of Fame (United Kingdom). Samuel Dunning was on a voyage from Rangoon, Burma to Liverpool.
USS Southfield	United States Navy	Illustration of USS Southfield sinking. American Civil War, Battle of Plymouth: The gunboat was rammed and sunk in the Roanoke River off Plymouth, North Carolina, Confederate States of America by the ironclad ram CSS Albemarle (Confederate States Navy). Twelve of her crew died; 49 were rescued.

== 20 April ==
List of shipwrecks: 20 April 1864
Ship	State	Description
HMS Wanderer	Royal Navy	The gunvessel was driven ashore at "Cape Passer". Subsequently refloated, repaired and returned to service.

== 21 April ==
List of shipwrecks: 21 April 1864
Ship	State	Description
Integrity	United Kingdom	The barque foundered in the Atlantic Ocean off Lisbon, Portugal. Her ten crew were rescued by the brig Sisters (United Kingdom). Integrity was on a voyage from Cádiz, Spain to Saint John's, Newfoundland, British North America.
Loochoo	United Kingdom	The barque was wrecked in the Yangtze Kiang. Her crew were rescued. She was on a voyage from Ardrossan, Ayrshire to Shanghai, China.

== 22 April ==
List of shipwrecks: 22 April 1864
Ship	State	Description
Christine	United Kingdom	The ship sprang a leak and foundered in the North Sea 24 nautical miles (44 km) east north east of Scarborough, Yorkshire. Her crew were rescued. She was on a voyage from Middlesbrough, Yorkshire to Valencia, Spain.
USS Petrel	United States Navy	American Civil War: After being disabled in combat with Confederate forces on the Yazoo River near Yazoo City, Mississippi, Confederate States of America, the tinclad wooden paddle steamer was captured by the Confederates, stripped of her guns and stores, and burned.

== 23 April ==
List of shipwrecks: 23 April 1864
Ship	State	Description
Benledi	United Kingdom	The ship was wrecked on a reef off Nassau, Bahamas. She was on a voyage from Glasgow, Renfrewshire to Nassau.
Christine	Kingdom of Hanover	The ship foundered in the North Sea 24 nautical miles (44 km) east north east of Scarborough, Yorkshire, United Kingdom. Her crew were rescued. She was on a voyage from Middlesbrough, Yorkshire to Valencia, Spain.
Hastings	United States	The 191-ton sternwheel paddle steamer struck a snag and sank in the Red River of the South at Alexandria, Louisiana.
Janet	United Kingdom	The smack was wrecked at Coleraine, County Londonderry. Her crew were rescued. She was on a voyage from Glasgow, Renfrewshire to Coleraine.
Rockingham	United States	American Civil War: The 976-ton full-rigged ship, carrying a cargo of guano from Callao, Peru, to Cork, United Kingdom, was captured, used for gunnery practice, and then burned in the Atlantic Ocean west of the Cape Verde Islands (approximately 15°53′N 31°44′W) by the screw sloop-of-war CSS Alabama (Confederate States Navy).
Sola	(Denmark) Danish West Indies	The schooner was abandoned in the Atlantic Ocean. Her crew were rescued by Lady Butt (United Kingdom.
Vixen	United Kingdom	The paddle tug ran aground and sank in the Clyde.
Woodbine	United Kingdom	The ship was destroyed by fire at Marianople, Russia. Two of her crew were severely wounded.

== 24 April ==
List of shipwrecks: 24 April 1864
Ship	State	Description
Crescent	United Kingdom	The schooner collided with Queen of the South (United Kingdom) and foundered off Queenstown, County Cork. Her crew were rescued. She was on a voyage from Cádiz, Spain to Liverpool, Lancashire.
Elizabeth Wilthew Green	United Kingdom	The ship ran aground on the Goodwin Sands, Kent. She was on a voyage from Sunderland, County Durham to Saint-Nazaire, Loire-Inférieure, France. She was refloated with the assistance of a tug and towed in to Ramsgate, Kent in a leaky condition.
Woodbine	United Kingdom	The ship was destroyed by fire at Marianople, Russia. Her crew were rescued, but two of them were severely burned.
Unnamed	United Kingdom	The barque was wrecked at Cape Quitate, 4 nautical miles (7.4 km) east of Al Hoceima, Morocco with the loss of three of her ten crew.

== 25 April ==
List of shipwrecks: 25 April 1864
Ship	State	Description
Agnes and Mary	United Kingdom	The ship was driven ashore at Coleraine, County Londonderry.
Magog	United Kingdom	The ship ran aground in the River Tay. She was refloated and put back to Dundee, Forfarshire.

== 26 April ==
List of shipwrecks: 26 April 1864
Ship	State	Description
Champion No. 3	United States	American Civil War, Red River Campaign: Transporting freed African-American slaves, the 195-ton sidewheel tug and pump steamer was wrecked on the Red River of the South 5 nautical miles (9.3 km) upstream of the mouth of the Cane River when a shell fired by the St. Mary's Cannoneers Louisiana Artillery Regiment exploded in her boiler, scalding to death 177 of the 192 people on board, including 172 freed slaves. Confederate forces then sank her wreck in the river as a blockship.
Homer	United States	American Civil War: The sidewheel paddle steamer was scuttled in the Ouachita River off Camden, to prevent her capture by Confederate forces.

== 27 April ==
List of shipwrecks: 27 April 1864
Ship	State	Description
Champion No. 5	United States	American Civil War, Red River Campaign: The 184-ton sidewheel tug and pump steamer was disabled on the Red River of the South in Louisiana 5 nautical miles (9.3 km) upstream of the mouth of the Cane River by Confederate sharpshooters and cannon fire by the St. Mary's Cannoneers Louisiana Artillery Regiment. She ran aground and sank, leaving her hurricane deck and boiler deck underwater.
Margaret	United Kingdom	The smack was wrecked in the Sound of Sleat. She was on a voyage from Kessock, Inverness-shire to "Loch Gushernock".
Tycoon	United States	American Civil War: The 717-ton barque, carrying a cargo of expensive clothing and other merchandise from New York to San Francisco, California, was captured and burned in the Atlantic Ocean east of Salvador, Brazil, by the screw sloop-of-war CSS Alabama (Confederate States Navy).

== 29 April ==
List of shipwrecks: 29 April 1864
Ship	State	Description
Prince Arthur	United Kingdom	The ship foundered in the Pacific Ocean 200 nautical miles (370 km) off Newcastle, New South Wales. She was on a voyage from Newcastle to Otago, New Zealand.
Queen	United Kingdom	The brig ran aground on the Puttgardens Reef, in the Baltic Sea off Fehmarn, Denmark and was wrecked. Her crew were rescued. She was on a voyage from Korsør, Denmark to Gävle, Sweden.

== 30 April ==
List of shipwrecks: 30 April 1864
Ship	State	Description
Amelia	United States	The schooner was lost near Point Judith, Rhode Island.
Chippewa Valley	United States	The 101-ton sternwheel paddle steamer struck a snag and sank in the Cumberland River 5 nautical miles (9.3 km) downstream of Gallatin Landing, Tennessee.
Falk	Sweden	The ship was wrecked near "Hagbyhamn". She was on a voyage from Kalmar to Leith, Lothian, United Kingdom.
Grecian	United Kingdom	The brig was wrecked on Nine Mile Beach, New South Wales during a gale.
Nacootan Francisco	Spain	The brig was wrecked on Key Cruz. Her crew survived. She was on a voyage from "Nacoitas" to London, United Kingdom.
Nor	Norway	The ship was holed by ice and sank in the Grand Banks of Newfoundland with the loss of all but two of her crew. Survivors were rescued by Montezuma (United Kingdom).

== Unknown date ==
List of shipwrecks: Unknown date in April 1864
Ship	State	Description
Adelheid	Belgium	The ship struck the Orbez Bank. She was on a voyage from Buenos Aires, Argentina to Antwerp. She was refloated and put in to Montevideo, Uruguay in a leaky condition.
Alma	Prussia	The brig foundered off the Isles of Scilly, United Kingdom. Her crew were rescued.
Cactus	United Kingdom	The ship was driven ashore on the coast of Seine-Inférieure, France.
Camillus	United Kingdom	The ship foundered in the Atlantic Ocean. Her crew were rescued. She was on a voyage from the Rio Grande to Queenstown, County Cork.
Casualidad	Spain	The barque was driven ashore at Cárdenas, Cuba.
Charlotte	Hamburg	The ship foundered in the North Sea before 25 April. Her crew were rescued. She was on a voyage from Nykøbing, Denmark to London, United Kingdom.
Drie Stahlen	Flag unknown	The ship caught fire and was run ashore near Havana, Cuba. She was on a voyage from Swansea, Glamorgan, United Kingdom to Havana.
Eleanor	United Kingdom	The ship was driven ashore at Hyannis, Massachusetts, United States. She was on a voyage from Cardiff, Glamorgan to Portland, Maine, United States.
Emma	United Kingdom	The ship was driven ashore on the coast of Norfolk. She was on a voyage from Gothenburg, Sweden to London. She was refloated on 29 April and towed in to Great Yarmouth, Norfolk.
Falmouth	United Kingdom	The full-rigged ship foundered. She was on a voyage from New York, United States to Aspinwall, United States of Colombia.
Herman	Flag unknown	The ship was driven ashore at "Longstrup". She was on a voyage from Messina, Sicily, Italy to Saint Petersburg, Russia.
Idaho	United States	American Civil War: The sidewheel paddle steamer was sunk accidentally in the Ohio River by a United States Navy gunboat. She later was refloated.
Juanita	Mexico	American Civil War, Union blockade: The schooner, under the control of a United States Navy prize crew after being captured off San Luis Pass, Texas, by the armed screw steamer USS Virginia (United States Navy) on 11 April, ran aground at San Luis Pass on either 11 or 13 April and was captured by Confederate forces. One source claims she was aground on 12 April when United States Navy warships shelled her, hitting her once.
Ludwig	Sweden	The ship was lost. She was on a voyage from Calcutta, India to Gothenburg.
Mount Vernon	United Kingdom	The ship was driven ashore on the Ilha de Itamaracá, Uruguay. She was on a voyage from Cardiff to São Vicente, Cape Verde Islands and Pernambuco, Brazil.
Muscovite	(United Kingdom of Great Britain and Ireland) British North America	The schooner was abandoned in the Atlantic Ocean. Her six crew were rescued by Nebraska (United States). Muscovite was on a voyage from Church Point, Nova Scotia to Antigua.
Oder	Prussia	The ship sank at Havana.
Presto	United Kingdom	The ship was wrecked at Coatzacoalcos, Mexico. Her crew were rescued. She was on a voyage from Coatzacoalcos to Liverpool, Lancashire.
R. D. Whidden	United Kingdom	The barque was wrecked on Inagua, Bahamas before 18 April. She was on a voyage from Port-au-Prince, Haiti to the Clyde.
Renskernbooltees	Netherlands	The ship sank of the mouth of the River Tyne.
Seringapatam	United Kingdom	The ship was abandoned in the Atlantic Ocean before 25 April. Her crew were rescued. She was on a voyage from New York to Queenstown.
St. Mary′s	United States	American Civil War: The sidewheel paddle steamer was sunk on the Alabama River in Alabama by a Confederate mine. She was refloated, repaired, and returned to service.
Teme	United Kingdom	The ship was driven ashore near Marianople, Russia.
Utopia	United Kingdom	The ship was driven ashore at Mogador, Morocco. She was on a voyage from Liverpool to Mogador She was refloated on 5 April.
Two unidentified torpedo boats	Confederate States Navy	American Civil War: The torpedo boats were destroyed in a large cotton fire at Wilmington, North Carolina.
