= Italian ironclad Formidabile =

Ironclad warship of the Italian Royal Navy

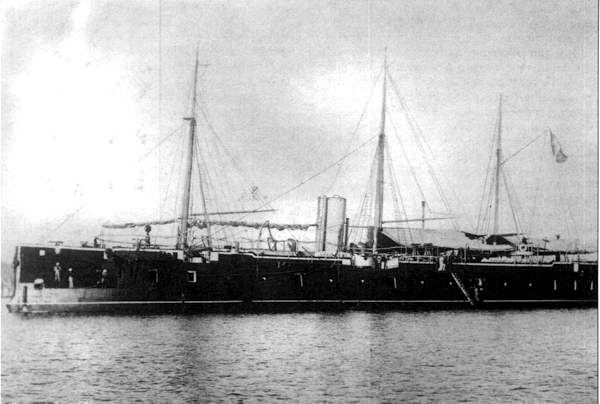
- Formidabile

History

Italy
- Name: Formidabile
- Laid down: December 1860
- Launched: 1 October 1861
- Completed: May 1862
- Stricken: 1903
- Fate: Broken up

General characteristics
- Class & type: Formidabile-class ironclad
- Displacement: Normal: 2,682 long tons (2,725 t); Full load: 2,807 long tons (2,852 t)
- Length: 65.8 m (215 ft 11 in)
- Beam: 14.44 m (47 ft 5 in)
- Draft: 5.45 m (17 ft 11 in)
- Installed power: 6 × fire-tube boilers; 1,080 ihp (810 kW)
- Propulsion: 1 × marine steam engine; 1 × screw propeller
- Speed: 10 knots (19 km/h; 12 mph)
- Range: 1,300 nmi (2,400 km) at 10 kn (19 km/h; 12 mph)
- Complement: 371
- Armament: 4 × 203 mm (8 in) guns; 16 × 164 mm (6 in) guns
- Armor: Belt armor: 109 mm (4.3 in)

Formidabile was the lead ship of the Formidabile-class ironclad warships, the first ships of that type to be built for the newly formed Italian Regia Marina (Royal Navy). Formidabile and her sister, Terribile, were both built in France; Formidabile was laid down in December 1860, was launched in October 1861, and was completed in May 1862. She was a broadside ironclad, equipped with four 203 mm (8 in) and sixteen 164 mm (6.5 in) guns.

The ship took part in the operation off Lissa in 1866 during the Third Italian War of Independence. There, she silenced the Austrian coastal batteries protecting the main port, but she was too badly damaged to take part in the ensuing Battle of Lissa. The ship's postwar career was limited due to a combination of drastically reduced naval budgets and the appearance of more modern ironclads. Formidabile was used as a training ship starting in 1887; she was discarded in 1903 and broken up for scrap.

== Design ==
The two Formidabile-class ironclads were originally ordered as armored floating batteries in the wake of the Crimean War, but were converted into sea-going ironclad corvettes during construction. They were the first armored warships built for the Kingdom of Piedmont-Sardinia, which became the unified Kingdom of Italy. The Sardinians' longtime rival across the Adriatic Sea, the Austrian Empire, respnded with ironclads of their own, thus beginning the Austro-Italian ironclad arms race.

Formidabile was 65.8 meters (215 ft 11 in) long overall; she had a beam of 14.44 m (47 ft 5 in) and an average draft of 5.45 m (17 ft 11 in). She displaced 2,682 long tons (2,725 t) normally and up to 2,807 long tons (2,852 t) at full load. She had a crew of 371. Her propulsion system consisted of one single-expansion marine steam engine that drove a single screw propeller, with steam supplied by six coal-fired, rectangular fire-tube boilers. The boilers were vented through a single funnel. Her engine produced a top speed of 10 knots (19 km/h; 12 mph) from 1,080 indicated horsepower (810 kW). She could steam for about 1,300 nautical miles (2,400 km; 1,500 mi) at her top speed. To supplement her steam engine, the ship was schooner-rigged.

Formidabile was a broadside ironclad, carrying all of her guns in the traditional broadside arrangement. She was armed with a main battery of four 203 mm (8 in) guns and sixteen 164 mm (6.5 in) rifled muzzle-loading guns. The ship's wooden hull was sheathed with wrought iron belt armor that was 109 mm (4.3 in) thick.

== Service history ==
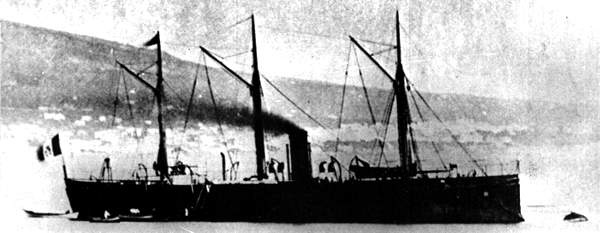
Formidabile in 1870

Formidabile was laid down at the Société Nouvelle des Forges et Chantiers de la Méditerranée shipyard in La Seyne, France in December 1860, originally ordered by the Royal Sardinian Navy. She was launched on 1 October 1861 and was completed in May 1862; by this time, the Sardinian fleet had been reformed as the Regia Marina (Royal Navy) of the newly unified Kingdom of Italy. In June 1866, Italy declared war on Austria, as part of the Third Italian War of Independence, which was fought concurrently with the Austro-Prussian War. The Italian fleet commander, Admiral Carlo Pellion di Persano, initially adopted a cautious course of action; he was unwilling to risk battle with the Austrian Navy, despite the fact that the Austrian fleet was much weaker than his own. Persano claimed he was simply waiting on the ironclad ram Affondatore, en route from Britain, but his inaction weakened morale in the fleet, with many of his subordinates openly accusing him of cowardice.

Rear Admiral Wilhelm von Tegetthoff brought the Austrian fleet to Ancona on 27 June, in attempt to draw out the Italians. Persano held a council of war aboard the ironclad Principe di Carignano to determine whether he should sortie to engage Tegetthoff, but by that time, the Austrians had withdrawn, making the decision moot. The Minister of the Navy, Agostino Depretis, urged Persano to act and suggested he capture the island of Lissa, to restore Italian confidence after their defeat at the Battle of Custoza the previous month. On 7 July, Persano left Ancona and conducted a sweep into the Adriatic, but encountered no Austrian ships and returned on the 13th.

=== Battle of Lissa ===
On 16 July, Persano took the Italian fleet out of Ancona, bound for Lissa, where they arrived on the 18th. With them, they brought troop transports carrying 3,000 soldiers; the Italian warships began bombarding the Austrian forts on the island, with the intention of landing the soldiers once the fortresses had been silenced. In response, the Austrian Navy sent the fleet under Tegetthoff to attack the Italian ships. Formidabile was at that time in the 3rd Division, along with her sister Terribile, the ironclads Re di Portogallo and Regina Maria Pia, and the coastal defense ship Varese. The Italian 2nd and 3rd Divisions were sent to attack the coastal batteries protecting the town of Vis; Formidabile, Re d'Italia, San Martino, and Palestro were assigned the western defenses, while four other ironclads were tasked with suppressing the batteries on the eastern side. Formidabile was sent to engage Fort San Giorgio at close range while the other ironclads shelled it from afar; one shell from the ironclad Regina Maria Pia detonated the fort's powder magazine, which neutralized the defenses. The success prompted Persano to order several ironclads to attempt to force an entrance into the harbor, but heavy Austrian artillery fire forced him to break off the attempt. After the attack failed, the Italians withdrew late in the day, preparing to launch another attack the following morning. Persano ordered Formidabile to enter the harbor at Vis and attack the Madonna battery, supported by the ironclads Castelfidardo, Ancona, and Principe di Carignano.

Concerned that the Austrian fleet would attack the morning of 19 July, Persano delayed beginning the attack for several hours. The new turret ship Affondatore arrived off Lissa that morning, and Persano ordered it to support Formidabile's attack. Upon entering the small harbor, the Italians found it impossible for the other ships to attack simultaneously, and so Formidabile was left to engage the Madonna battery alone. The ship's captain, Simone Antonio Saint-Bon, anchored Formidibile some 370 m (400 yd) from the battery, exchanging heavy fire with the Austrian defenders. The ship was hit numerous times; the hits destroyed most of the gun port covers and disabled one of her guns. Austrian riflemen also fired at the ship, attempting to hit crewmen in the open. In return, Formidibile's shells could not penetrate the stone walls of the fortress, which were about 6.1 m (20 ft) thick. During the action, Castelfidardo, Ancona, and Principe di Carignano attempted to enter the port, but came under heavy fire themselves and after suffering a number of damaging hits, withdrew. Following the conclusion of the bombardment, Saint-Bon reported to Persano that his ship had suffered heavy casualties, amounting to three killed and fifty-five wounded, and had been significantly damaged by Austrian fire, though the armor had not been penetrated.

Saint-Bon then took his battered ship to the west, where he transferred his wounded to a hospital ship. The following day, while Formidabile was still transferring wounded men to the hospital ship, the Austrian fleet under Tegetthoff appeared. Persano had ordered Formidabile to return to the line, but Saint-Bon informed Persano that his ship was unable to fight, and instead he withdrew to Ancona. The Italians were defeated in the ensuing battle, with the ironclads Re d'Italia and Palestro sunk. Saint-Bon was later awarded the Gold Medal of Military Valor for his actions on 19 July.

=== Later career ===
After the battle, Persano was replaced by Admiral Giovanni Vacca; he was ordered to attack the main Austrian naval base at Pola, but the war ended before the operation could be carried out. After the end of the war, the government lost confidence in the fleet and drastically reduced the naval budget. The cuts were so severe that the fleet had great difficulty in mobilizing its ironclad squadron to attack the port of Civitavecchia in September 1870, as part of the wars of Italian unification. Instead, the ships were laid up and the sailors conscripted to man them were sent home. In addition, Formidabile was rapidly surpassed, first by central battery and then turret ships, which made the first generation of ironclads like Formidabile and her sister obsolete.

As of October 1871, Formidabile was stationed in Naples, along with Terribile and Principe di Carignano and a number of smaller vessels. In 1872–1873, the ship received new boilers. Her armament was significantly reduced in 1878 to eight 8-inch guns. In 1887, the ship was withdrawn from front-line service and was thereafter employed as a gunnery training ship. At this time, her armament was reduced to six 4.7 in (120 mm) guns. She served in this capacity until 1903, when she was stricken from the naval register and subsequently broken up for scrap.
