= Calcutta and Burmah Steam Navigation Company =

Former British company

- Industry: Transport
- Founded: 1856
- Defunct: 1862
- Successor: British-India Steam Navigation Company
- Headquarters: London
- Products: Mail Shipping

The Calcutta and Burmah Steam Navigation Company (C&BSN) was a British steamship company formed in 1856 and absorbed into the British-India Steam Navigation Company in 1862.

== History ==
The Calcutta and Burmah Steam Navigation Company (Limited) was formed in London, United Kingdom in 1856. Its directors were J. Halliday, William Mackinnon and Robert Mackenzie. It was founded with an initial capital fo £35,000 in 700 £50 shares. The company was set up to provide a steamship service between Calcutta, India and Moulmein, Burma and the intermediate ports of Akyab and Rangoon, on behalf of the Honourable East India Company, with any spare accommodation being offered to the public. Services were to commence on or before 15 November 1856.

The contract was renewed in 1862, when the service was extended to Singapore. From October 1862, the C&BSN served Akyab, Bimlipatam, Calcutta, Chittagong, Coconada, Curlew Island, Kurrachee, Kyook Phyoo, Madras, Malacca, Mergui, Moulmen, Negapatam, Penang, Pondicherry, Poorie, Port Blair, Rangoon, Sandoway, Singapore, Tavoy and Vizagapatam. In November 1862 its name was changed to British India Steam Navigation Company (Limited) [BISNCo.]. Robert Mackenzie had died in 1853, even before the company had been formed but William Mackinnon, who was chairman of the shipowning companies from the earliest years until his death in 1893, is considered the 'father' of the company. He was created baronet in 1889.

At the time of its inauguration and for many years afterwards, C&BSN and then BISNCo. were supervised by Mackinnon, Mackenzie & Co as Managing Agents. This company acquired many trading interests during its life, including tea, jute and management of BI's coal mines in India.

== Ships ==
The C&BSN operated the following ships:-

- Cape of Good Hope, an auxiliary steamship.
- Burmah, Built by Messrs. Scott & Co, Greenock and launched on 3 February 1858.
- Calcutta, built by Messrs. William Simons & Co., Renfrew and launched on 24 March 1860. Wrecked on the Arklow Bank, in the Irish Sea off the coast of County Wicklow, on 21 May 1860 whilst being delivered to Madras. All on board were rescued.
- Coringa, built by Messrs. Alexander Stephen & Sons, Kelvinhaugh and launched on 24 January 1861.
- Moulmein, built by Messrs. William Simons & Co., and launched on 12 February 1861.
- Bussorah, built by Messrs L. Hill & Co., Greenock, and launched in November 1862.
