= USS Antelope (1861) =

Gunboat of the United States Navy

History

United States
- Ordered: as Lavinia Logan
- Launched: 1861
- In service: 1864
- Fate: Beached 23 September 1864

General characteristics
- Displacement: 145 tons
- Propulsion: steam engine; stern paddle wheel
- Armament: 2 × 30-pounder rifled guns; 4 × 24-pounder smoothbore guns

USS Antelope was a stern-wheel steamer acquired by the Union Navy for service during the American Civil War. Originally Lavinia Logan—a charter vessel built in 1861 at Parkersburg, Virginia (now West Virginia) — she was purchased in 1864 to support operations of the Union Army along the streams of the Mississippi River.

== Service history ==
During the first years of the Civil War, the Federal War Department used Lavinia Logan—a chartered stern-wheel steamer built in 1861 at Parkersburg, Virginia (now West Virginia)—to support operations of the Union Army along the streams of the Mississippi River drainage system, especially Major General Ulysses S. Grant's efforts to capture the Confederate river fortress at Vicksburg, Mississippi.

The vessel's Navy service did not prove nearly as successful as her duty with the Army, amounting to only some six weeks on patrol without action before chronic flooding caused her total loss in a forced beaching. Following the fall of Vicksburg in the summer of 1863, Lavinia Logan seems to have returned to private hands for a time. In any case, the Union Navy acquired the vessel at Louisville, Kentucky, in the spring of 1864; and, on 26 May of that year, Rear Admiral David D. Porter wrote to Secretary of the Navy Gideon Welles reporting the purchase and recommending that her name be changed to Antelope. Apparently, he had acquired the ship to meet Rear Admiral Farragut's need for light-draft gunboats and had her hull covered with iron plates by naval shipfitters at Mound City, Illinois.

Antelope first appears on the list of vessels composing the West Gulf Blockading Squadron on 15 August 1864 with the notation that she was then at New Orleans, Louisiana. Her service in this role proved exceptionally short-lived. Within three weeks of entering service Antelope began to chronically flood. The paperwork on her purchase was finally completed on 31 August 1864. By 4 September, under command of Acting Master John Ross, she was at Pass a l’Outre where she had relieved the sidewheeler Meteor. While there, she began taking on considerable water; and her leaks steadily increased. An inspection of the inside of her hull revealed that ". . . the leak was not confined to any one place, but extended to all parts of the bottom sides." After she had been on station for a full week, Ross reported ". . . the condition of the vessel and that I was obliged to keep up 60 pounds of steam to work the steam pumps, as we could not keep her free by the hand pumps."

The ship was relieved as soon as possible and ordered back to New Orleans for repairs. On the evening of 22 September, during her trip upriver, Antelope came upon the Army transport Suffolk—abandoned and in a sinking condition—and towed her to shoal water where she would be safe on the flats. Antelope then resumed her ascent of the river. About 4:30 a.m. on 23 September 1864 Ross learned his ship was sinking. He ordered the helm hard aport to beach her. While filling rapidly, Antelope grounded enabling her crew to save her ordnance and equipment. No record of efforts to salvage the ship has been found.
