= Italian ironclad Terribile =

Ironclad warship of the Italian Royal Navy

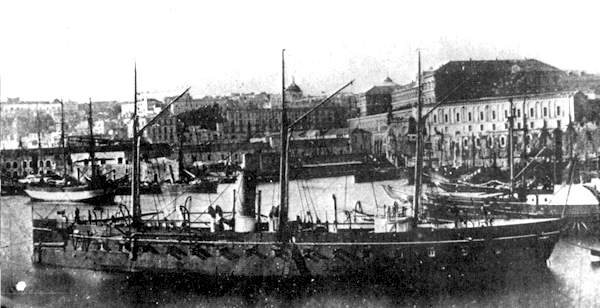
- Terribile in Naples in 1869

History

Italy
- Name: Terribile
- Laid down: June 1860
- Launched: 16 February 1861
- Completed: September 1861
- Stricken: 1904
- Fate: Broken up

General characteristics
- Class & type: Formidabile-class ironclad
- Displacement: Normal: 2,682 long tons (2,725 t); Full load: 2,807 long tons (2,852 t)
- Length: 65.8 m (215 ft 11 in)
- Beam: 14.44 m (47 ft 5 in)
- Draft: 5.45 m (17 ft 11 in)
- Installed power: 6 × fire-tube boilers; 1,100 ihp (820 kW)
- Propulsion: 1 × marine steam engine; 1 × screw propeller
- Speed: 10 knots (19 km/h; 12 mph)
- Range: 1,300 nmi (2,400 km) at 10 kn (19 km/h; 12 mph)
- Complement: 371
- Armament: 4 × 203 mm (8 in) guns; 16 × 164 mm (6 in) guns
- Armor: Belt armor: 109 mm (4.3 in)

Terribile was the first ironclad warship to be built for the Italian Regia Marina (Royal Navy), and the second member of the Formidabile class. Terribile and her sister, Formidabile, were both built in France. A broadside ironclad, she was laid down in June 1860, launched in February 1861, and was completed in September that year. She was the first Italian ironclad to enter service and was equipped with four 203 mm (8 in) and sixteen 164 mm (6.5 in) guns.

The ship took part in the operation off Lissa in 1866 during the Third Italian War of Independence. There, was tasked with neutralizing the Austrian coastal batteries protecting the port at Comisa, which placed her too far away to take part in the ensuing Battle of Lissa. The ship's postwar career was limited due to a combination of drastically reduced naval budgets and the appearance of more modern ironclads. In 1885, Terribile was withdrawn from service for use as a training ship. She remained in service until 1904 when she was broken up for scrap.

== Design ==
The two Formidabile-class ironclads were originally ordered as armored floating batteries in the wake of the Crimean War, but were converted into sea-going ironclad corvettes during construction. They were the first armored warships built for the Kingdom of Piedmont-Sardinia, which became the unified Kingdom of Italy. The Sardinians' longtime rival across the Adriatic Sea, the Austrian Empire, respnded with ironclads of their own, thus beginning the Austro-Italian ironclad arms race.

Terribile was 65.8 meters (215 ft 11 in) long overall; she had a beam of 14.44 m (47 ft 5 in) and an average draft of 5.45 m (17 ft 11 in). She displaced 2,682 long tons (2,725 t) normally and up to 2,807 long tons (2,852 t) at full load. She had a crew of 371. Her propulsion system consisted of one single-expansion marine steam engine that drove a single screw propeller, with steam supplied by six coal-fired, rectangular fire-tube boilers. The boilers were vented through a single funnel. Her engine produced a top speed of 10 knots (19 km/h; 12 mph) from 1,100 indicated horsepower (820 kW). She could steam for about 1,300 nautical miles (2,400 km; 1,500 mi) at her top speed. To supplement her steam engine, the ship was schooner-rigged.

Terribile was a broadside ironclad, armed with a main battery of four 203 mm (8 in) guns and sixteen 164 mm (6.5 in) rifled muzzle-loading guns. The ship's hull was sheathed with wrought iron armor that was 109 mm (4.3 in) thick.

== Service history ==
Terribilewas built by the Société Nouvelle des Forges et Chantiers de la Méditerranée shipyard in La Seyne; her keel was laid down in June 1860, the first member of her class to begin construction. She was launched on 16 February 1861 and was completed in September that year. Ordered for the Royal Sardinian Navy, by the time the ship had been completed Italy had unified and Terribile was instead commissioned into the new Regia Marina (Royal Navy). In June 1866, Italy declared war on Austria, as part of the Third Italian War of Independence, which was fought concurrently with the Austro-Prussian War. The Italian fleet commander, Admiral Carlo Pellion di Persano, initially adopted a cautious course of action; he was unwilling to risk battle with the Austrian Navy, despite the fact that the Austrian fleet was much weaker than his own. Persano claimed he was simply waiting on the ironclad ram Affondatore, en route from Britain, but his inaction weakened morale in the fleet, with many of his subordinates openly accusing him of cowardice.

Rear Admiral Wilhelm von Tegetthoff brought the Austrian fleet to Ancona on June 27, in attempt to draw out the Italians. At the time, many of the Italian ships were in disarray; Terribile was carrying only half her guns at the time, and other ships were experiencing various difficulties with their engines or armament. Persano held a council of war aboard the ironclad Principe di Carignano to determine whether he should sortie to engage Tegetthoff, but by that time, the Austrians had withdrawn, making the decision moot. The Minister of the Navy, Agostino Depretis, urged Persano to act and suggested the island of Lissa, to restore Italian confidence after their defeat at the Battle of Custoza the previous month. On 7 July, Persano left Ancona and conducted a sweep into the Adriatic, but encountered no Austrian ships and returned on the 13th.

=== Battle of Lissa ===
Map showing the disposition of the fleets on 20 July; Terribile was further to the south and did not see action

On 16 July, Persano took the Italian fleet out of Ancona, bound for Lissa, where they arrived on the 18th. With them, they brought troop transports carrying 3,000 soldiers; the Italian warships began bombarding the Austrian forts on the island, with the intention of landing the soldiers once the fortresses had been silenced. In response, the Austrian Navy sent the fleet under Tegetthoff to attack the Italian ships. Terribile was at that time in the 3rd Division, along with her sister Formidabile, the ironclads Re di Portogallo and Regina Maria Pia, and the coastal defense ship Varese. The Italian 2nd and 3rd Divisions were sent to attack the coastal batteries protecting the town of Vis; Terribile, Regina Maria Pia, Re di Portogallo, and Varese were assigned the eastern defenses, while four other ironclads were tasked with suppressing the batteries on the western side. Formidabile was sent to engage Fort San Giorgio at close range while the other ironclads shelled it from afar; one shell from Regina Maria Pia detonated the fort's powder magazine, which neutralized the defenses. The success prompted Persano to order Regina Maria Pia and San Martino to attempt to force an entrance into the harbor, but heavy Austrian artillery fire forced him to break off the attempt. After the attack failed, the Italians withdrew late in the day, preparing to launch another attack the following morning.

During the attack on 19 July, Persano ordered Terribile and Varese to attack the fortifications protecting the town of Comisa, while the rest of the fleet would attack the main port at Vis. These attacks again failed to defeat the Austrian defenders. With the day's attacks again having yielded no results, Persano met with his senior officers to discuss options. His chief of staff, d'Amico, and Vacca both suggested a withdrawal owing to the shortage of coal, but Persano ruled that out. He ultimately decided to make another attempt on the 20th. Vacca would take his three ships to patrol to the north-east of the island while the rest of the fleet would again try to land the soldiers.

Persano repeated his orders for the 20th, with Terribile and Varese again tasked with suppressing the batteries at Comisa. Before the Italians could begin the attack, but after the fleet had begun to disperse for the landing operation, the dispatch boat Esploratore arrived, bringing news of Tegetthoff's approach. Persano's fleet was in disarray; Terribile and Varese were nine miles to the west of most of his ships, preparing to attack Comisa, and three other ironclads were to the north-east. Persano immediately recalled Terribile and Varese while he ordered his ships first into a line abreast formation, and then to line ahead formation. Shortly before the action began, Persano left his flagship, Re d'Italia, and transferred to Affondatore, though none of his subordinates on the other ships were aware of the change. They there thus left to fight as individuals without direction.

Terribile did not see action during the battle; she only fired a single long-range shot at the ship of the line Kaiser as the latter, badly damaged in the melee, withdrew to Vis. She had answered Persano's summons very slowly and only arrived on the scene after Re d'Italia had been rammed and sunk, and the coastal defense ship Palestro had been set on fire, soon to be destroyed by a magazine explosion. Persano's forces had withdrawn, and though his ships still outnumbered the Austrians, Persano refused to counter-attack. The Italian fleet began to withdraw, followed by the Austrians; as night began to fall, the opposing fleets disengaged completely, heading for Ancona and Pola, respectively.

=== Later career ===
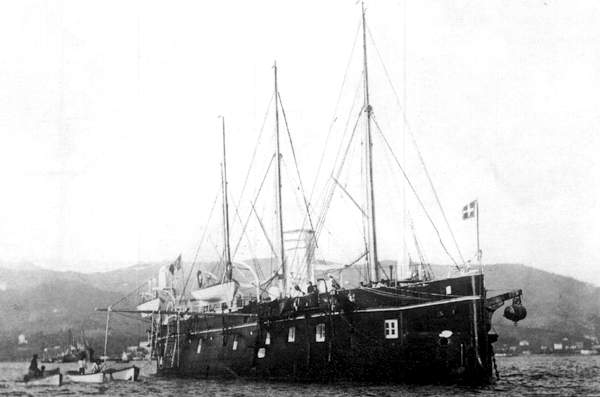
Terribile in La Spezia in 1896

After the battle, Persano was replaced by Admiral Giovanni Vacca; he was ordered to attack the main Austrian naval base at Pola, but the war ended before the operation could be carried out. After the end of the war, the government lost confidence in the fleet and drastically reduced the naval budget. The cuts were so severe that the fleet had great difficulty in mobilizing its ironclad squadron to attack the port of Civitavecchia in September 1870, as part of the wars of Italian unification. Instead, the ships were laid up and the sailors conscripted to man them were sent home. Terribile was rapidly surpassed, first by central battery and then turret ships, which made the first generation of ironclads like Terribile and her sister obsolete.

By October 1871, Terribile had been stationed in Naples. She was joined there by Terrible, Principe di Carignano, and several smaller vessels. On 3 December 1872, Terribile was driven ashore in a storm at Naples. In 1872–1873, the ship received new boilers. Her armament was significantly reduced in 1878 to eight 8-inch guns. Starting in 1885, Terribile was employed as a training ship. By that time her armament had been revised and now consisted of two 6 in (152 mm) guns, two 5.9 in (150 mm) guns, and two 4.7 in (119 mm) guns alongside two torpedo tubes. She served in this capacity until 1904, when she was stricken from the naval register and subsequently broken up for scrap.
