= SS Octa =

British cargo ship (1861–1871)

History

United Kingdom
- Name: Octa
- Owner: Norwood C. M. & Co.
- Builder: Earle's Shipbuilding
- Completed: 1861
- Out of service: 1 May 1871
- Fate: wrecked at Terschelling, the Netherland on 1 May 1871

General characteristics
- Tonnage: 569 GRT
- Length: 40 m (131 ft 3 in)
- Depth: 15 m (49 ft 3 in)
- Installed power: 70 hp (52 kW)
- Crew: 19

SS Octa was a 1861 built British steamship. The ship had a tonnage of 569 gross register tons (GRT). It was owned by Norwood C. M. & Co. in Hull. On 1 May 1871 the ship was driven ashore and wrecked on Terschelling, the Netherlands. The 19 crew members were rescued.

== Ship details ==
The ship was built by Earle's Shipbuilding in 1861. It measured 569 gross register tons (GRT) and was 40 metres (131 ft 3 in) long with a beam of 8 metres (26 ft 3 in). The ship had a compound steam engine with a single shaft and one screw that created 70 horsepower (52 kW).

== Fate ==
On 1 May 1871 she was on voyage from Hamburg to London with a cargo of breakbulk cargo and living sheep but the ship was driven ashore and wrecked on Terschelling, the Netherlands. After the ship stranded it sank. The 19 crew members were saved.

Within a few months the wreck had been broken into two pieces.

== Cargo ==
Several of the sheep were brought to Terschelling, as well as skins, hair and salted meat. Imports of these goods were at the time prohibited there. The sheep looked healthy and were examined by the governmental veterinarian.

Already shortly after the ship wrecked, salvors had recovered cargo. On 22 May at Terschelling and 24 May at Vlieland auctions were organized to sell the recovered cargo and inventory of the ship including Bohemian glassware, wine, paintings, hundreds bags of sugar, hundreds animal skins.

Om 26 May 1871 the anchor was salvaged. On 30 June 1871 a box of 'tinsel' was found, but turned out to be worthless due to the seawater. A cargo of zinc blocks was also discovered. After two months, of 8 July 1871, a diver salvaged 270 units of tin (later stated to be zinc) of 18 kilograms (40 lb) each. All the broken glassware made it difficult to salvage the zinc. The diver earns 45% of the value. As of 22 July a total of 8000kg of zinc was salvaged. ultimately a total of 1,340 plates of zinc were salvaged. They were sold per 5,000 kg (11,000 lb) on 1 September 1871 in Amsterdam under supervision of Lloyds Bank.

On 2 September 1871 the mast was pulled down.

== 20th-century wreck dives ==
In 1992, a Dutch diving team dived to a wreck at around the position of the ship shown on a map that was made in 1871. They found an old steamship, with still iron bars as cargo. Some ribs were found, possibly from sheep. The ship had a compound steam engine that had fallen over. In 1995 the wreck turned out to be silted up again. However, some damselfly blocks and refractory bricks from the steam boiler were found at the time.
