= USS Glasgow =

Gunboat of the United States Navy

United Kingdom
- Name: Eugenie
- Owner: South Eastern Railway
- Route: Cross-Channel
- Builder: Samuelson, Hull, UK
- Launched: 9 July 1861
- Fate: Sold, 1863

United States
- Name: Glasgow, 21 January 1864
- Acquired: 9 July 1863
- Commissioned: 9 July 1863
- Decommissioned: 17 October 1868
- Captured: By Union Navy forces, 6 May 1863
- Fate: Sold, 4 June 1869

United Kingdom
- Name: Hilda
- Acquired: 4 June 1869
- Fate: Scrapped, 1889

General characteristics
- Tonnage: 428 gross register tons (GRT)
- Tons burthen: 252
- Length: 235 ft (71.6 m)
- Beam: 24 ft 3 in (7.4 m)
- Draft: 6 ft 9 in (2.06 m)
- Depth: 11 ft 9 in (3.6 m)
- Propulsion: 2 Oscillating steam engines; side wheel-propelled
- Speed: 9.5 kn (17.6 km/h; 10.9 mph)
- Armament: one 12-pounder howitzer; one 12-pounder rifle

USS Glasgow was originally a British cross-Channel sidewheel steamer named Eugenie owned by the South Eastern Railway that was built during the early 1860s. She was sold for blockade-running duties in 1863 and was captured by the Union Navy later that year during the American Civil War. Incorporated into the Navy, she was principally used as a dispatch boat and storeship in support of the Union blockade of the ports of the Confederate States of America. Renamed Glasgow in 1864, she sank after striking an obstacle the following year, but was refloated and repaired. The ship was sold back into commercial service in 1869 and was scrapped 20 years later.

== Service history ==
=== As Eugenie ===
Originally a blockade runner named Eugenie, the ship was captured off Mobile Bay on 6 May 1863 by USS R. R. Cuyler. She was purchased from the Key West, Florida, Prize Court and commissioned on 9 July 1863, Acting Ensign N. M. Dyer in command. Assigned to the West Gulf Blockading Squadron, Eugenie served as a dispatch boat and supply ship for the squadron between Mobile Bay and Pensacola, Florida.

Eugenie was sent on an expedition to Mermentau Lake, Louisiana, on 22 December 1863, for the capture of two British blockade runners. The schooner Derby was captured, but had to be burnt because of heavy enemy shore fire on the attacking party.

=== As Glasgow ===
Eugenie was renamed Glasgow on 21 January 1864, and after a week repairing at New Orleans, Louisiana, in early February, was back on station with the blockading fleet off Mobile, Alabama. Serving mainly as dispatch boat, Glasgow aided in the destruction of blockade runner Ivanhoe under the fire of Fort Morgan on 30 June 1864, and fired at an unknown blockade runner under the guns of the fort on 1 July. She was present off Fort Gaines on 8 August when the fort surrendered to Union forces after Admiral David Farragut's historic victory at Mobile Bay, and received the admiral on board for a brief visit on 26 November.

During 1865, Glasgow continued her regular duties, and in addition served occasionally, because of her speed and light draft, as flagship of the West Gulf Squadron. She struck an obstruction and sank in shoal water off Mobile 8 May 1865, and was not raised until 19 June. Glasgow was taken to Pensacola for repairs and returned to duty on 1 July 1866.

Chosen to be retained for the post-war cruising squadron in the Gulf of Mexico, Glasgow served as storeship and visited New Orleans, Lakeport, and Mexican ports until she entered the Pensacola Navy Yard for repairs on 23 January 1868. Departing Pensacola on 10 March, she spent another five months cruising with the squadron on the lower Mississippi River and off Pensacola, returning there on 6 August 1868. She decommissioned on 17 October 1868 at Pensacola and was sold 4 June 1869 to Thomas McClellan.
