= Formidabile-class ironclad =

Ironclad warship class of the Italian Royal Navy

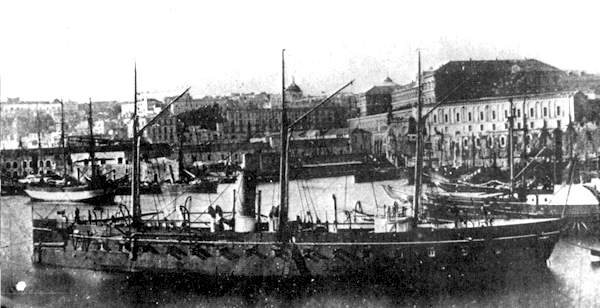
- Terribile in Naples in 1869

Class overview
- Name: Formidabile class
- Builders: Société Nouvelle des Forges et Chantiers de la Méditerranée
- Operators: Regia Marina
- Preceded by: None
- Succeeded by: Principe di Carignano class
- Built: 1860–1862
- In commission: 1861–1904
- Completed: 2
- Retired: 2

General characteristics (Note: Figures are for Formidabile)
- Type: Ironclad warship
- Displacement: Normal: 2,682 long tons (2,725 t); Full load: 2,807 long tons (2,852 t)
- Length: 65.8 m (215 ft 11 in)
- Beam: 14.44 m (47 ft 5 in)
- Draft: 5.45 m (17 ft 11 in)
- Installed power: 6 × fire-tube boilers; 1,080 ihp (810 kW)
- Propulsion: 1 × marine steam engine; 1 × screw propeller
- Speed: 10 knots (19 km/h; 12 mph)
- Range: 1,300 nmi (2,400 km) at 10 kn (19 km/h; 12 mph)
- Complement: 371
- Armament: 4 × 203 mm (8 in) guns; 16 × 164 mm (6 in) guns
- Armor: Belt armor: 109 mm (4.3 in)

The Formidabile class was a pair of ironclad warships built for the Italian Regia Marina (Royal Navy) in the 1860s. The class comprised two ships, Formidabile and Terribile. Initially ordered for the Regia Marina Sarda (Royal Sardinian Navy), by the time they were completed the Kingdom of Sardinia had unified the rest of the Italian states and created the Regia Marina. They were the first ironclads built for the Italian fleet. Wooden-hulled vessels plated with 4.3 inches (109 mm) of wrought iron, they were armed with a battery of twenty guns in a broadside arrangement.

Both vessels were involved in the operations off Lissa in July 1866, but neither took part in the Battle of Lissa on 20 July. Formidabile had been damaged by Austrian coastal fortifications the day before, and had withdrawn for repairs; Terribile was ready for action, but had been preparing to attack Lissa and was too far south to take an active role in the battle. Both ships saw minimal use in the 1870s and 1880s, until both were withdrawn from service for use as training ships. Formidabile and Terribile served in this capacity until 1903 and 1904, respectively, when they were sold and broken up for scrap.

== Design ==
The two ships of the Formidabile class were ordered by Camillo Benso, Count of Cavour, then both the Prime Minister and Naval Minister of the Kingdom of Sardinia for the Royal Sardinian Navy in 1860, shortly before the unification of Italy. The ships were originally intended to be armored floating batteries, but they were redesigned as sea-going ironclads after construction began. These ships were the first components of a major naval expansion program that was designed to prepare a fleet of ironclad warships capable of defeating the Austrian Navy. Italy considered the Austrian Empire to be its main rival, since it controlled predominantly Italian areas, including Venice. Their construction marked the onset of the Austro-Italian ironclad arms race.

=== General characteristics and machinery ===
The Formidabile-class ships were wooden-hulled vessels, sheathed with wrought iron armor that was 109 mm (4.3 in) thick. They were 63.05 meters (206 ft 10 in) long between perpendiculars and 65.8 m (215 ft 11 in) and long overall. They had a beam of 14.44 m (47 ft 5 in) and an average draft of 5.45 m (17 ft 11 in). The ships displaced 2,682 long tons (2,725 t) normally and up to 2,807 long tons (2,852 t) at full load. Each vessel had a crew of 371 officers and enlisted men.

Their propulsion system consisted of one single-expansion marine steam engine that drove a single screw propeller, with steam supplied by six coal-fired, rectangular boilers. The boilers were trunked into a single funnel. Their engines produced a top speed of 10 knots (19 km/h; 12 mph) from 1,080 indicated horsepower (810 kW), though Terribile's boilers produced a slightly higher horsepower, at 1,100 ihp (820 kW). They could steam for about 1,300 nautical miles (2,400 km; 1,500 mi) at their top speed. To supplement the steam engine, the ships were schooner-rigged with three masts.

=== Armament ===
The ships of the Formidabile class were originally intended to be armed with thirty guns, but after their conversion to sea-going broadside ironclads, their armament was reduced to twenty guns. These consisted of four 203 mm (8 in) guns and sixteen 164 mm (6.5 in) rifled muzzle-loading guns. Their armament was revised several times throughout their careers. In 1878, both ships had their battery reduced to eight 203 mm guns. Terribile was re-armed with two 6 in (152 mm) guns, two 5.9 in (150 mm) guns, and four 4.7 in (119 mm) guns for service as a training ship in 1885. Two years later, Formidabile was similarly converted into a training ship, equipped with only six 4.7 in guns.

== Ships ==
Construction data
Name	Builder	Laid down	Launched	Completed
Formidabile	Société Nouvelle des Forges et Chantiers de la Méditerranée	December 1860	1 October 1861	May 1862
Terribile	Société Nouvelle des Forges et Chantiers de la Méditerranée	June 1860	16 February 1861	September 1861

== Service history ==
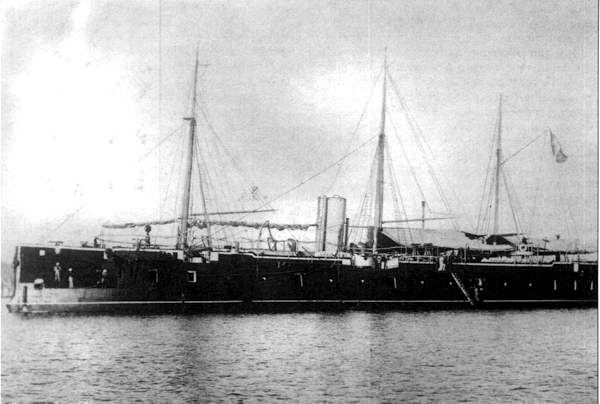
Formidabile c. 1870

The first ironclads to enter service in the Regia Marina of the newly-unified Kingdom of Italy, Formidabile and Terribile served as the core of the fleet that was later fleshed out by the Principe di Carignano, Re d'Italia, and Regina Maria Pia classes that would see action during the Third Italian War of Independence against the Austrian Navy. The war broke out in June 1866, as Italy, which had allied with Prussia, sought to take advantage of the Austro-Prussian War to seize Austrian-controlled Venice. After initially remaining in port, the Italian fleet under Admiral Carlo Pellion di Persano launched an attack on the island of Lissa in mid-July; the Austrian fleet under Rear Admiral Wilhelm von Tegetthoff sortied to mount a counterattack, which resulted in the Battle of Lissa on 20 July. Formidable, which had been badly damaged during an engagement with Austrian coastal fortifications on Lissa the day before, had withdrawn by the time Tegetthoff arrived and took no part in the battle. Terribile also played no role in the action, as she had been stationed too far to the south in preparation for another attack on the island, and she arrived on the scene of the battle only after the two fleets had disengaged.

The two ships, which rapidly became obsolescent due to the development of central battery ironclads and later turret ships, remained in service until the 1880s, having been modernized with new boilers and guns in the 1870s. Neither ship played a role in the attack on Civitavecchia in 1870—the last stage of the Italian wars of unification—owing to the very poor state of the Regia Marina in the aftermath of Lissa. Formidable served as a gunnery training ship from 1887 to 1903, when she was discarded. Terribile also served as a training ship, beginning in 1885; she was sold for scrap in 1904 and broken up thereafter.
