= USS Pansy =

Tugboat of the United States Navy

History

United States
- Ordered: as Sampson
- Laid down: date unknown
- Launched: 1861
- Acquired: 30 September 1862
- In service: 30 September 1862
- Out of service: c. 1 September 1868
- Stricken: 1868 (est.)
- Home port: Cairo, Illinois; Vicksburg, Mississippi; Mound City, Illinois
- Fate: Sold, 1 September 1868

General characteristics
- Displacement: 46 tons
- Length: not known
- Beam: not known
- Draught: not known
- Propulsion: steam engine; screw-propelled
- Speed: not known
- Complement: not known
- Armament: one 12-pounder gun

USS Pansy was a steamer acquired by the Union Navy from the Union Army during the American Civil War. She served the Navy as a tugboat and as a dispatch boat.

She served in, and supported, several blockades of the Confederate States of America, including the Union Army's Western Flotilla and the Union Navy's Mississippi River Mortar Brigade.

== Built in Missouri for the Union Army in 1861 ==
Sampson, a screw tug built in 1861 at New Haven, Missouri, was purchased by the Union Army in the fall of 1861 for the use of the Western Flotilla; transferred to the Union Navy 30 September 1862; and placed in service the same day.

== Acquired by the Navy and renamed Pansy ==
Renamed Pansy 24 October 1862 the tug served the Mississippi squadron throughout the Civil War. Operating primarily out of Cairo, Illinois, and Vicksburg, Mississippi, she towed larger ships and acted as a dispatch vessel.

== Post-war service and deactivation ==
After the war she served as a tug at Mound City, Illinois, until sold there 1 September 1868.

== See also ==
- Anaconda Plan
- Mississippi Squadron
