= USS Virginia (1861) =

Gunboat of the United States Navy

History

United Kingdom
- Name: Pet
- Launched: 1861
- Renamed: Noe-Daquy
- Fate: Sold December 1862

History

Confederate States of America
- Name: Virginia
- Namesake: Virginia
- Acquired: December 1862
- Fate: Captured by United States Navy forces 18 January 1863

History

United States
- Name: Virginia
- Namesake: Previous name retained
- Acquired: 1 September 1863 (date of purchase)
- Commissioned: 12 June 1863
- Fate: Sold 30 November 1865

General characteristics
- Displacement: 581 tons
- Length: 170 ft (51.8 m)
- Beam: 26 ft 2 in (8.0 m)
- Depth: 14 ft 8 in (4.5 m)
- Propulsion: screw steamer
- Speed: 9 knots
- Complement: not known
- Armament: one 12-pounder rifled gun; six 24-pounder howitzers

The third USS Virginia was a 581-ton blockade-running steamer captured by the United States Navy and put to use during the American Civil War. Virginia served the U.S. Navy primarily as a mortar gunboat. Her ordnance included six 24-pounder howitzers and a 12-pounder rifled gun.

== British and Confederate service ==
Virginia was originally the British merchant screw steamer Pet, built at Dumbarton, Scotland, in 1861. Renamed Noe-Daquy, she operated during the early months of the American Civil War and in December 1862 was acquired by merchant at Havana, Cuba, for use as a Confederate blockade runner. Renamed Virginia, she was captured off Mugeres Island, Mexico, by the U.S. Navy sloop-of-war USS Wachusett and sidewheel gunboat USS Sonoma on 18 January 1863.

== U.S. Navy service ==
The U.S. Navy commissioned the ship as USS Virginia, the third U.S. Navy ship to bear the name, at the New York Navy Yard in Brooklyn, New York, on 12 June 1863. The U.S. Navy later officially purchased her from the New York City prize court on 1 September 1863.

=== West Gulf blockade ===
Virginia was assigned duty with Rear Admiral David G. Farragut's West Gulf Blockading Squadron and, within a week of her commissioning, departed New York City, bound for the Gulf of Mexico. En route, she stopped briefly at Hampton Roads, Virginia, finally joining Farragut's squadron in July 1863. However, further repairs and modifications were needed before she could become a fully effective fighting unit, and she spent August and most of September 1863 at New Orleans, Louisiana, undergoing overhaul.

=== Texas coast operations ===
Virginia finally returned to active duty in late September 1863 and was deployed along the coast of Texas for the duration of the war. There, she conducted numerous patrol and reconnaissance missions – which often took her up the rivers – and also compiled an impressive list of captures while enforcing the Union blockade of the Confederacy.

Her first success was the seizure of the British blockade runner Jenny with a cargo of cotton off the coast of Texas on 6 October 1863. Between 2 and 14 November 1863, screw sloop-of-war USS Monongahela, gunboat USS Owasco, and Virginia convoyed and supported Major General Nathaniel Banks's successful landing at Brazos Santiago, Texas, near the mouth of the Rio Grande. The expedition began a Union offensive aimed both at wresting Texas from Confederate control and deterring French troops in Mexico from attempting to invade Texas, and on 4 November 1863, Confederate forces evacuated Brownsville, Texas, giving the Union a strong foothold at the Mexican border. While supporting the expedition, Virginia captured the British steamer Matamoras on 4 November 1863 and the British brig Dashing Wave 5 November 1863.

After the Rio Grande expedition, Virginia returned to blockade duty and found the waters off Texas a fertile breeding ground of smuggling activity. This was especially true of the area off San Luis Pass, and Virginia made most of her captures there. These included the British schooner Mary Douglas and her cargo of coffee, bananas, and linen, which she seized on 15 February 1864, and the British schooner Henry Colthirst, which she took on 22 February 1864. On 29 February 1864 off Galveston, Texas, Virginia overhauled the Confederate schooner Camilla with a cargo of cotton. She captured the sloop Cassie Holtat the same time, but Cassie Holt grounded off San Luis Pass and was burned.

Once again off San Luis Pass, Virginia captured the sloop Randall on 8 March 1864, the schooner Sylphide on 10 March 1864, and the Mexican schooner Juanita on 11 April 1864. However, Juanita grounded on the 13 April and the Confederates recaptured her with the loss of her Union prize crew. This incident was partially offset by Virginia′s capture of the Mexican schooner Alma on the 19 March 1864 and the seizure and destruction of the sloop Rosina on 20 March 1864. Virginia′s last captures off San Luis Pass included the schooner Experiment, which she took on 3 May 1864 and subsequently destroyed, and 94 stacked bales of cotton picked up ashore on the 7 and 8 May 1864.

Virginia returned to New Orleans in mid-May 1864 for badly needed repairs to her boilers. She remained at New Orleans until 5 December 1864, when she departed for service in the blockade off Galveston. There she captured the schooner Belle on 27 December 1864. She also discovered the British sidewheel steamer Acadia wrecked on the coast of Texas about 6 miles 9 10 km) east-northeast of Velasco on 5–6 February 1865 and shelled her, but was unable to launch a boat crew to board and burn her because of rough seas.

== Post-war ==
After the war ended in April 1865, Virginia departed the Texas coast on 17 July 1865 for Philadelphia, Pennsylvania. She was sold at public auction at New York City to Perry Brothers on 30 November 1865 and was documented on 14 December 1865. She was re-rigged as a barge on 24 March 1885.

== See also ==
- Blockade runners of the American Civil War
- Blockade mail of the Confederacy
- Union Navy
