= SS United States (1864) =

US merchant steamship 1864-1881

History

United States
- Name: SS United States
- Builder: S. Gildersleeve & Son, Portland, Connecticut
- Launched: 1864
- Identification: Official number: 25082; Call sign: HSCM
- Fate: Wrecked off Cape Romain, South Carolina, 3 April 1881
- Notes: no lives lost

General characteristics
- Type: steamship
- Tonnage: 1,289 GRT 1,180.10 NRT
- Length: 197 ft 0 in (60.05 m) LOA
- Beam: 36 ft 5 in (11.10 m)
- Draught: 17 ft 2 in (5.23 m)
- Depth of hold: 24 ft 0 in (7.32 m)
- Decks: 3
- Installed power: 40 in × 40 in (1,000 mm × 1,000 mm), two cylinder, direct action steam engine
- Propulsion: screw
- Sail plan: brigantine

SS United States was a merchant steamship launched in 1864 and lost off Cape Romain, South Carolina, in 1881. She was the most expensive steamer built by the American shipbuilding firm of S. Gildersleeve & Son, which built 120 vessels. The vessel was named for her country and sported the United States' national symbol, an American eagle, as her figurehead.

She ran aground on Cape Romain on 3 April 1881.

In June 2013, E. Lee Spence announced that United States's wreck site had been located.

== Construction ==
United States, official number 25082, signal letters HSCM, home ported at Boston, was built in 1864 at the S. Gildersleeve & Son shipyard in Portland, Connecticut.

== Description ==
A screw steamer, United States was brigantine rigged (square rigged on the foremast and fore-and-aft rigged on the mainmast). She had an iron-strapped wood hull with three decks, a round stern, and deck saloons. The ship was built of white oak and cedar with fastenings were copper alloy and iron, and had a copper bottom (probably Muntz Metal, 60% copper and 40% zinc, with a trace of iron). She was built under inspection and classed A-1 for insurance purposes. The engine was a vertical direct action steam engine with two 40-inch (1,000 mm) cylinders with a 40-inch piston stroke.

== Ownership ==
Shortly after her launch, her captain was shown as Gurdon Gates and her owners as Wakemann, Dimon & Company and S. Gildersleeve & Sons.

Her homeport in 1872 was New York City and at that time she was captained by G.H. Smith and owned by Merchant Steamship Company.

By 1880, her home port was Boston, Massachusetts, where she was owned by Alfred A. Nickerson and Frederic W. Nickerson.

== Loss ==
On 6 April 1881, the Boston Daily Globe carried the headline "Wreck of the Well-Known Steamer of the Boston and Savannah Line Off Cape Romain" and reported:

The steamship United States, from Boston for Savannah, with a general cargo, went ashore on Cape Romain Sunday night (April 3, 1881). The ship has sprung a leak and the lower hold is full of water. The steam-tug H. Buck has arrived here from Georgetown, and brought the first officer of the steamship United States. The steamship left Boston on Thursday last, and proceeded on her voyage without mishap until Sunday night, when she met with a hazy atmosphere and with strong southwest winds. While the ship was running on her course she suddenly went ashore in about twelve feet of water in the vicinity of Cape Romain, a little to the northward and about half-way between Georgetown and this port. On Monday the steamer Planter, from Charleston for Georgetown, passed her and soon after returned with the steamer Louisa and endeavored to haul the stranded vessel off the shoal. The attempt was unsuccessful, and the two vessels returned to Georgetown. The United States remained easy in her position until Monday night, when the sea increased and the vessel sprang a leak. When the first officer left her this morning at 8 o'clock, there was from twelve to fourteen feet of water in her hold and she was hard aground. The first officer, immediately upon his arrival, engaged the tugs Wade Hampton and Republic, which left the city tonight for the scene of the mishap. They will endeavor to put out and tow off the stranded ship. If the tugs succeed in relieving her, she will probably be towed into this report for repairs."

Despite the hopes expressed above, United States was not able to be pulled off and the next day the Charleston News and Courier carried the following article titled "The Stranded Steamship.":

The steamers Planter and Louisa, which arrived here from Georgetown at a late hour on Tuesday night, brought a portion of the cargo of the steamship United States, which has been previously reported ashore off Cape Romain. This freight, consisting of articles of general merchandise, constituted the "between decks" cargo, and was saved in good condition and landed at Accommodation wharf. The vessels also brought the boats, furniture and a portion of the tackle of the United States. Capt. S.H. Matthewes, the master of the vessel, came to the city with a portion of the crew, and leaving the first officer, Mr. A.B. Crooker, here, returned with the tugs Wade Hampton and Republic to the scene of the wreck. The two passengers who were on the United States also came to the city on the Planter, and went to Savannah yesterday morning by rail. The Charleston tugs reached the city last night with Capt. Matthewes on board, having failed to pump out the water from the stranded vessel, which had bilged. The sea was too heavy for the tugs to work alongside, and at 2 P.M. the captain determined to abandon her. A portion of the cargo and tackle was secured and placed on board a pilot boat from Georgetown, and the crew, numbering twenty-seven persons, was transferred to the tug Forrest City, which had arrived at the scene of the wreck with the agent of the vessel from Savannah, and sent to that city. When the vessel was abandoned there was fourteen feet of water in her hold, and the wreck was fast going to pieces. The steam wrecking flat Uncle Sam, under the command of Capt. Smith, was left alongside, with a view to save whatever could be secured from the wreck. Capt. Matthewes and his first officer will remain here for several days to look after the cargo that has been saved. He could give no information as to the value of the vessel and cargo, or the amount for which they were insured."

Her permanent enrollment, which was issued at Boston on 4 May 1880, and surrendered at Boston on 5 May 1881, carries the note: "Vessel wrecked April 3, 1881, near Charleston, S.C.", while other official government records show her as "Lost June 30, 1881," which may have been the day of her legal abandonment by her owners.

At the time of her loss, United States was described as valued at about $60,000 and her cargo as worth about $25,000.

== Distribution of cargo ==
United States had three decks. Cargo could have been stored on any of them. The ship's hold, where the majority of a ship's cargo was stored, was not normally considered a deck. Contemporary newspaper accounts specifically mention her "between decks cargo." A "between deck" or "tweendeck" is any deck between the main deck and the ship's hold. "Tweendeck space" is the space between any two continuous decks. The mention of a between decks cargo suggests that her hold was filled to capacity, as, for weight and balance considerations, it would have been loaded first.

Cargo such as bales, bags, or drums can be stacked in the tweendeck space, atop the tweendeck.

Beneath the lowest deck is the hold space, used for general cargo. General cargo was packaged and crated items like jewelry, bottled medicines, wine, liquor, china, guns, mantle clocks, furniture, machinery, footwear, garments, and other merchandise.

== Contemporary salvage ==
Although aground, it was initially thought United States could be saved. By the time it was realized that she couldn't be saved, she had 14 feet (4.3 m) of water in her and was "fast going to pieces." The easily accessible "between deck" cargo, was saved in good condition.

There is no record that any of the merchandise in her cargo hold, which was below water, was salvaged.
