= USS J. C. Kuhn =

Cargo ship of the United States Navy

History

United States
- Launched: 1859
- Acquired: 6 July 1861
- Commissioned: 23 August 1861
- Fate: Sold, 7 July 1869

General characteristics
- Tonnage: 888
- Length: 153 ft (47 m)
- Beam: 35 ft (11 m)
- Draft: 13 ft 5 in (4.09 m)
- Propulsion: sail
- Complement: 61
- Armament: four 32-pounder guns

USS J. C. Kuhn was a capacious bark acquired by the Union Navy during the American Civil War. She was used by the Union Navy as a stores ship in support of the Union Navy blockade of Confederate waterways.

== Service history ==
J. C. Kuhn was a wooden bark of two decks and three masts built at Portland, Connecticut by S. Gildersleeve & Sons, in 1859. She was purchased by the Navy at New York City from J. H. Brower & Co. on 6 July 1861; and commissioned at New York Navy Yard on 23 August, Acting Master Robert G. Lee in command. The supply and coal vessel reported to the Gulf Blockading Squadron at Key West, Florida, 11 September bringing a cargo of coal, lumber, and whaleboats. Six days later she delivered coal and provisions to Union vessels off Fort Pickens, Florida, to begin her record of dependable service carrying fuel, food, lumber, and water to Union ships in the Gulf of Mexico and the lower Mississippi River. She arrived below Vicksburg, Mississippi, on 27 June 1862 loaded with coal for Flag Officer David Farragut's ships the day before they daringly steamed under the Southern batteries there to join forces with Flag Officer Davis's Mississippi Flotilla, which had been fighting its way south along the river. She remained below Vicksburg supporting Comdr. David Dixon Porter's Mortar Flotilla while Farragut operated above the Confederate stronghold until his ships had again run the gauntlet to rejoin Porter on 15 July.

She then sailed down river with Farragut and resumed her duty of transporting supplies from Pensacola, Florida, to ships stationed along the U.S. Gulf Coast. In the spring of 1864, J. C. Kuhn was ordered to Pensacola for service as ordnance and store ship, and she continued this duty until sailing for New York on 20 January 1866. After arriving at New York City on 14 February and discharging her stores, the veteran bark received badly needed repairs. Restored and refurbished, J. C. Kuhn stood down to the Battery on 7 April, and 3 days later was renamed Purveyor. As Purveyor, she supplied the European and South Atlantic Squadrons and served as a store ship before being sold at New York to P. H. Fay on 7 July 1869.
