= USS Cayuga (1861) =

Unadilla-class gunboat

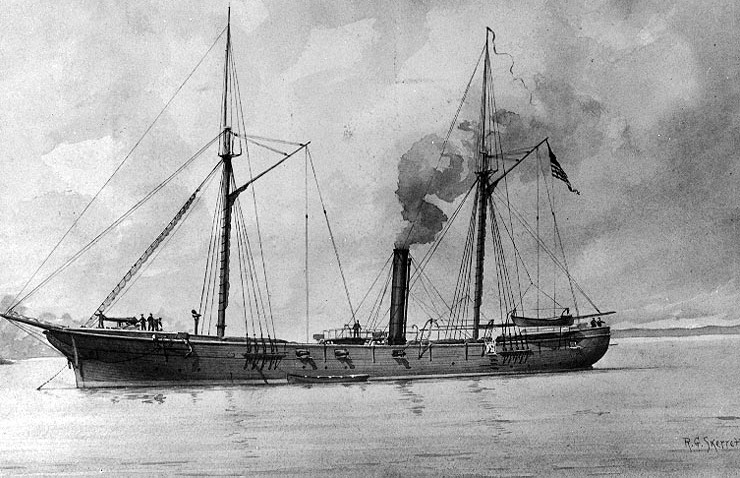
- USS Cayuga

History

United States
- Name: USS Cayuga
- Builder: S. Gildersleeve & Sons (Portland, CT)
- Launched: 21 October 1861
- Commissioned: 21 February 1862
- Decommissioned: 31 July 1865
- Fate: Sold, 25 October 1865

General characteristics
- Class & type: Unadilla-class gunboat
- Displacement: 691 tons
- Tons burthen: 507
- Length: 158 ft (48 m) (waterline)
- Beam: 28 ft (8.5 m)
- Draft: 9 ft 6 in (2.90 m) (max.)
- Depth of hold: 12 ft (3.7 m)
- Propulsion: 2 × 200 IHP 30-in bore by 18 in stroke horizontal back-acting engines; single screw
- Sail plan: Two-masted schooner
- Speed: 10 kn (11.5 mph)
- Complement: 114
- Armament: Original: 1 × 11-in Dahlgren smoothbore; 2 × 24-pdr smoothbore; 2 × 20-pdr Parrott rifle

The first USS Cayuga was a Unadilla-class gunboat in the United States Navy.

Cayuga was launched 21 October 1861 by S. Gildersleeve and Sons, Portland, Connecticut and outfitted at New York Navy Yard. She was commissioned 21 February 1862, Lieutenant N. B. Harrison in command, and reported to the West Gulf Blockading Squadron.

== Service history ==
Cayuga arrived at Ship Island in Mississippi Sound on 26 March 1862, for service in the lower Mississippi River, its tributaries, and along the Gulf coast of Texas. Only once did she leave this area, from 1 May to 8 July 1862, when she made repairs at New York Navy Yard.

Playing an important part in the blockade which cut the Confederacy off from overseas sources of supply, Cayuga took an impressive number of prizes, including schooner Jesse J. Cox (25 March 1862), schooner Tampico (3 April 1863), sloop Blue Bell (2 July 1863), schooner J. T. Davis (10 August 1863), and schooner Wave (22 August 1863). In addition, she shared in the capture of sloop Active (21 June 1863).

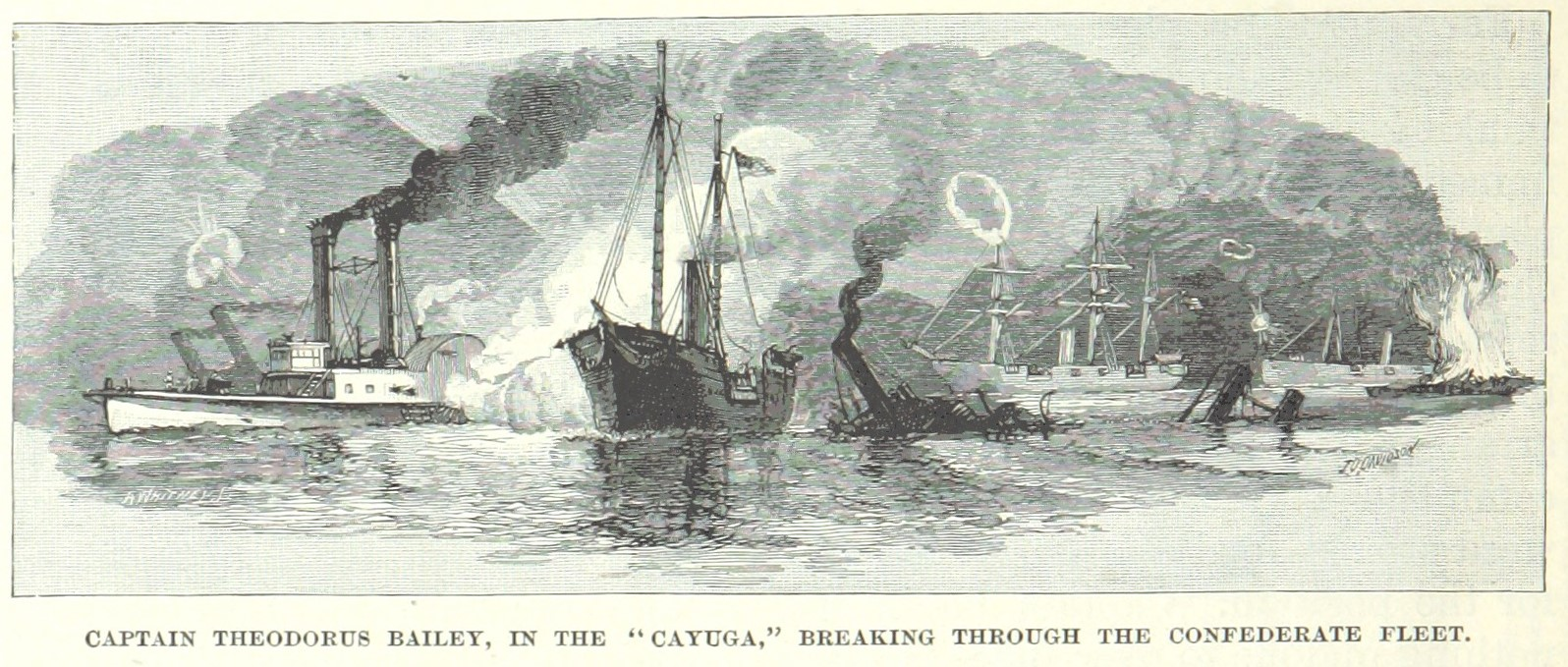
Cayuga at the Battle of Forts Jackson and St. Philip

Cayuga also joined in the engagement with Forts Jackson and St. Philip below New Orleans, Louisiana in April 1862, which led to the fall of the city to Flag Officer David Farragut. Three of Cayuga's sailors were awarded the Medal of Honor for their actions during this battle: Captain of the Afterguard William Parker, Quartermaster Edward Wright, and Boatswain's Mate William Young. The ship then bombarded Donaldsonville, Louisiana, on 9 August 1862. On 18 April 1863, at Sabine Pass, Texas, her commanding officer, Lieutenant Commander David McDermut, led a party of men ashore in a reconnaissance designed as the last step in a plan to cut out Confederate steamers lying at Sabine, then to establish control of the Sabine River, separating southern forces in Texas from those in Louisiana. The party was surprised by Confederate soldiers; McDermut was mortally wounded and six men were taken prisoner.

Cayuga's active service ended with her departure from Galveston, Texas, 4 July 1865 for New York, where she arrived 26 July. She was decommissioned 31 July 1865, and sold 25 October 1865.
