= Henry Gildersleeve =

Henry Gildersleeve may refer to:

- Henry Gildersleeve (shipbuilder) (c. 1817–1894), American shipbuilder
- Henry Alger Gildersleeve (1840–1923), American jurist and sports shooter
