= USS Guard (1857) =

Cargo ship of the United States Navy

History

United States
- Ordered: as National Guard
- Launched: 1857
- Acquired: 6 July 1861
- Commissioned: 23 December 1862
- Decommissioned: 10 November 1865
- Out of service: 15 December 1878
- Fate: Sold, 27 September 1883

General characteristics
- Displacement: 1,846 tons
- Length: 160 ft (49 m)
- Beam: 38 ft (12 m)
- Draft: 20 ft 7 in (6.27 m)
- Propulsion: sail
- Sail plan: full-rigged
- Complement: 95
- Armament: 4 × 8 in (203 mm) Dahlgren rifles; 2 × 12-pounder howitzers

USS Guard was a fourth-class ship-rigged sailing vessel, armed with four 8-inch (203 mm) Dahlgren guns and one 21-pdr howitzer, acquired by the Union Navy during the American Civil War.

She was placed into service as a storeship and assigned to support the ships blockading the ports of the Confederate States of America. Post-war she was recommissioned several times for various tasks including supporting the American fleet stationed in Europe with supplies and participating in the Darien expedition.

== Service history ==
National Guard was built by George D. Morgan, Portland, Connecticut, in 1857; purchased 6 July 1861 by the Union Navy, and commissioned 23 December 1862, Acting Master William Lee Hays in command. From commissioning until she decommissioned in 1865, National Guard served as supply ship for the West India Squadron based at Cap-Haïtien, Haiti. A routine trip to Key West, Florida, for supplies in June 1865 turned into a voyage to Boston, Massachusetts, for quarantine and decommissioning when yellow fever broke out among the crew, leaving National Guard with a sick list of over twenty. Decommissioned at Boston on 10 November 1865, Guard recommissioned 13 March 1866, Acting Master Lewis A. Brown in command. She was renamed as Guard on 2 June 1866.

After a trip to Norfolk, Virginia, for supplies and minor repairs, she sailed for Cádiz, Spain, arriving there 16 August. For the next 3 years Guard served as supply ship for the U. S. Navy European Squadron, carrying supplies and occasional passengers to such diverse ports as Lisbon, Portugal; Cartagena, Spain; Mallorca, Spain; Palermo, Italy; Gibraltar, Naples, Italy; Madeira, Spain; and Villefranche-sur-Mer, France. During this period she also made three voyages to New York City, carrying passengers and some invalids for hospitals there and returning with fresh supplies. Guard returned to New York City 12 October 1869 and decommissioned 5 November.

Guard recommissioned 17 January 1870, Lt. Comdr. Edward P. Lull in command, to take part in the Darien Expedition; she sailed from New York City 28 January, arriving in Caledonia Bay, off the Isthmus of Darien, 18 February. In company with Nipsic and Nyack, under the overall command of Comdr. Thomas O. Selfridge Jr., Guard conducted hydrographic surveys to determine what route, if any, would be best for a ship canal across the isthmus. The five routes explored during the 2 years she was on this special duty all proved impractical at the time, and the dream of an inter-ocean canal went unfulfilled until the completion of the Panama Canal two generations later. Guard's duty in Central America was interrupted 12 August 1870 – 3 October 1870 when she sailed from New York City to Prince Edward Island and Nova Scotia with supplies. Leaving the Darien Expedition in June 1870, Guard returned to New York City 22 July and decommissioned there 3 August.

On 1 February 1873, Guard again recommissioned, Comdr. Charles A. Babcock commanding, and sailed from New York City 22 March with goods, exhibits, and construction materiel for the Vienna Exposition of 1873. She arrived at Trieste, then a part of Austro-Hungary, via Gibraltar and Brindisi 3 May. After discharging her cargo for the exposition, Guard remained there undergoing minor repairs. Many of the articles not disposed of at the exposition were then reloaded, as well as some European goods intended for the American Centennial Exposition in 1876, and Guard sailed for New York City 31 December 1873, arriving there 14 April 1874 via Messina, Sicily, and Gibraltar. She decommissioned 27 April and remained laid up in ordinary until 1877.

Guard's final tour of duty began 18 August 1877 as she recommissioned at New York City, Lt. Comdr. F. M. Green commanding. Her mission was to determine by means of the submarine communications cable the longitudes between Lisbon, Madeira, the Cape de Verde Islands, Pernambuco, and Buenos Aires. Sailing from New York 29 October, she reached Lisbon 30 November and remained there until 3 February 1878, when she sailed to Madeira and from there to the Cape de Verde Islands. Her next stop was Porto Grande, St. Vincente, where she delivered a shipment of astronomical equipment for the observatory there before sailing for Rio de Janeiro 20 April. Arriving there 1 June, Guard conducted further astronomical surveys of the Brazilian coast until, her work completed, she sailed for Portsmouth, New Hampshire, arriving there via Norfolk on 4 December. She decommissioned 15 December 1878 and was laid up in ordinary until 27 September 1883, when she was sold to C. A. Williams & Co. of New London, Connecticut.
