= John Hall Sage =

American banker and ornithologist

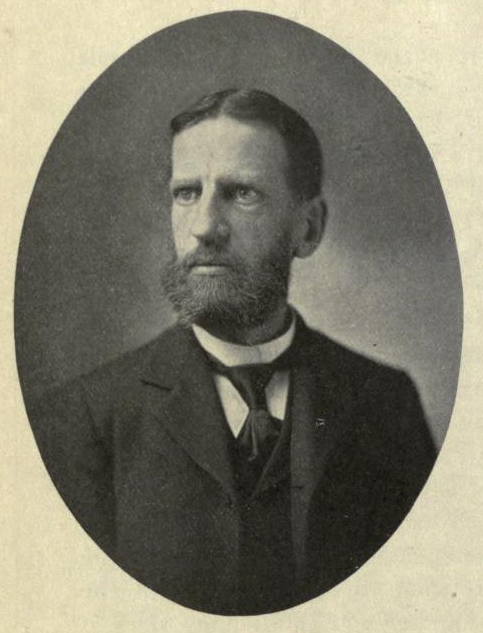
- Born: April 20, 1847; Portland, Connecticut, US
- Died: August 16, 1925 (aged 78); Boston, Massachusetts, US
- Occupation: Ornithologist
- Organization: American Ornithological Society

John Hall Sage (April 20, 1847 – August 16, 1925) was an American banker and ornithologist who published scores of essays on the birds of Connecticut and other topics for the American Ornithologists' Union, which he served as secretary for twenty-eight years.

Born in Portland, Connecticut, Sage was a lifelong resident of the state. He attended public schools in Bridgeport and Portland and clerked for Aetna following graduation from Bridgeport High School. He never attended college. In 1873, he became a teller at the First National Bank of Portland. He worked his way up to cashier in 1879, the same year he became treasurer of the Freestone Savings Bank of Portland, which he later served as president. Following the merger of these two banks in 1925, he became chairman of the board of directors of the Portland Trust Company.

From 1878, Sage became a prolific writer and amateur ornithologist. He published over one hundred essays and articles in scientific journals, state publications, and local newspapers. His book The Birds of Connecticut (Hartford, CT: State Geological and Natural History Survey, 1913) gained him recognition as the preeminent expert on the subject. A lifelong member of the American Ornithologists' Union, Sage served as secretary for twenty-eight years and took extensive minutes at Union meetings, which formed the historical record of the society. He also served one term as the Union's president.

Sage bequeathed his personal papers and collection of 5,000 taxidermied birds to the Wadsworth Atheneum, where he had worked as curator of natural history. In 1946, the Wadsworth loaned the collection to Trinity College due to storage constraints and a shifting scope. The University of Connecticut now holds Sage's papers and specimens.

In recognition of his contributions to science, Sage received an honorary Master of Science degree from Trinity College. He was a fellow of the American Association for the Advancement of Science and a member of the Connecticut Botanical Society, the Connecticut Historical Society, the New York Academy of Sciences, the Linnaean Society of New York, the Biological Society of Washington, the Cooper Ornithological Club, the Wilson Ornithological Club, the Hartford Bird Study Club, and National Audubon Society. Active in the community throughout his life, Sage held various minor offices and served as a director of the Brainerd, Shaler and Hall Quarry Company; the Portland Water Company; and Middletown Hospital.

Sage married Agnes Farwell Kellogg of Hartford in 1880. The couple had one daughter, Harriet Eliza Sage. In 1925, he died of an embolism at Boston General Hospital in Massachusetts following a short illness. He was 78 years old. He was interred at Trinity Church Cemetery in Portland.
