= William Young (Medal of Honor) =

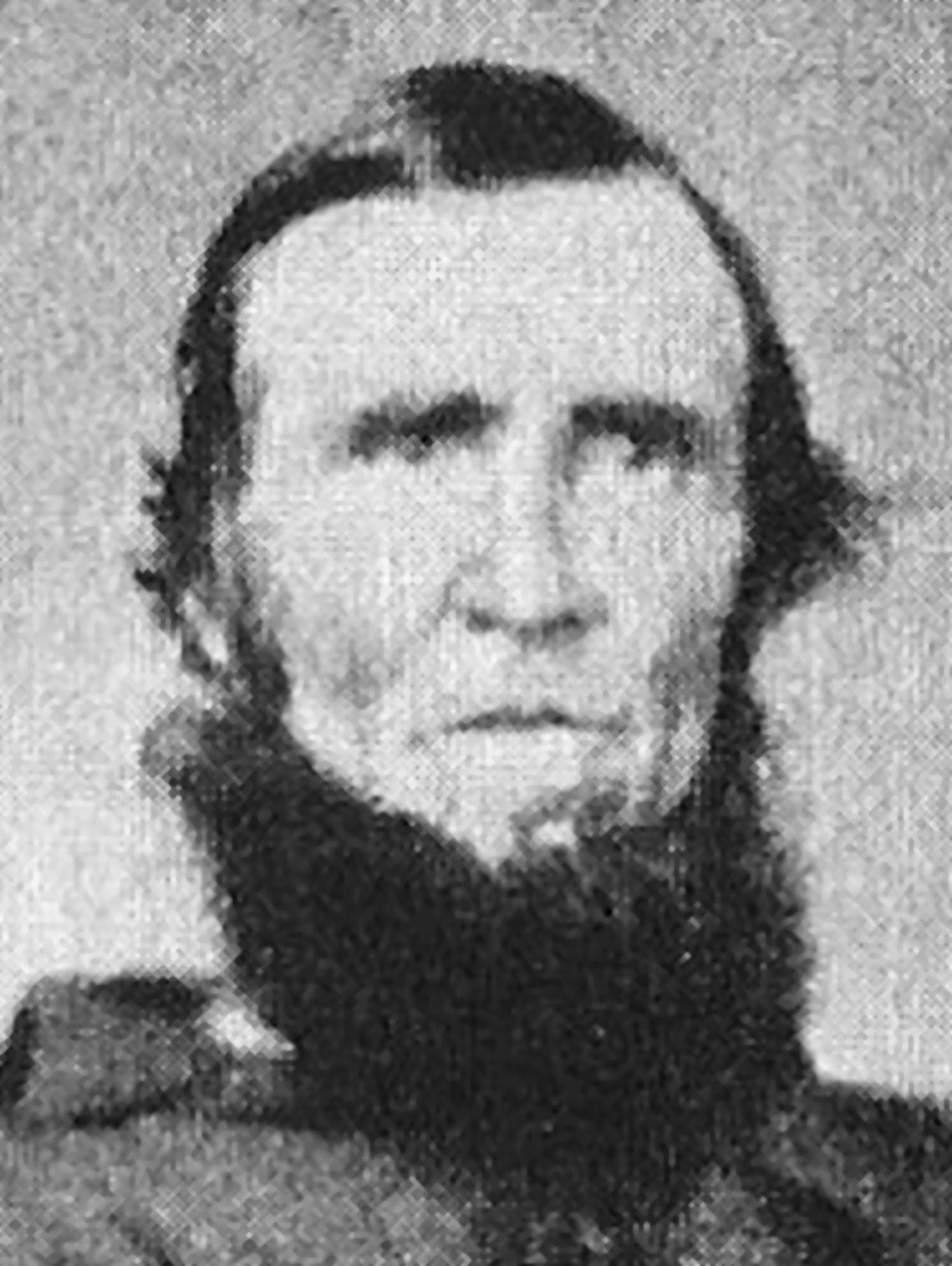
- Born: c. 1835; New York
- Died: 1878; Erie, Pennsylvania
- Burial place: Erie Cemetery, Section 16
- Military career
- Allegiance: United States
- Branch: United States Navy
- Rank: Boatswain's Mate
- Unit: USS Cayuga
- Conflicts: American Civil War • Battle of Forts Jackson and St. Philip
- Awards: Medal of Honor

William Young (c. 1835 – December 26, 1878) was a Union Navy sailor in the American Civil War and a recipient of the U.S. military's highest decoration, the Medal of Honor, for his actions at the Battle of Forts Jackson and St. Philip.

Born in about 1835 in New York, Young joined the navy from that state. He served during the civil war as a boatswain's mate on the USS Cayuga. In Louisiana on April 24–25, 1862, the ship led a Union fleet up the Mississippi River past two Confederate forts, Jackson and St. Philip, which guarded the approach to New Orleans. Young manned a Parrott gun throughout the battle despite heavy fire from Confederate ships and the two forts. Successfully passing the forts, the Union force went on to capture New Orleans. For his part in this action, Young was awarded the Medal of Honor a year later, on April 3, 1863.

Young's official Medal of Honor citation reads:

On board the U.S.S. Cayuga during the capture of Forts St. Philip and Jackson and the taking of New Orleans, 24 and 25 April 1862. As his ship led the advance column toward the barrier and both forts opened fire simultaneously, striking the vessel from stem to stern, Young calmly manned a Parrot gun throughout the action in which attempts by three rebel steamers to butt and board were thwarted and the ships driven off or captured, 11 gunboats were successfully engaged and garrisons forced to surrender. During the battle, the Cayuga sustained 46 hits.
