= E. Alexander Bergstrom =

American ornithologist (1919–1973)

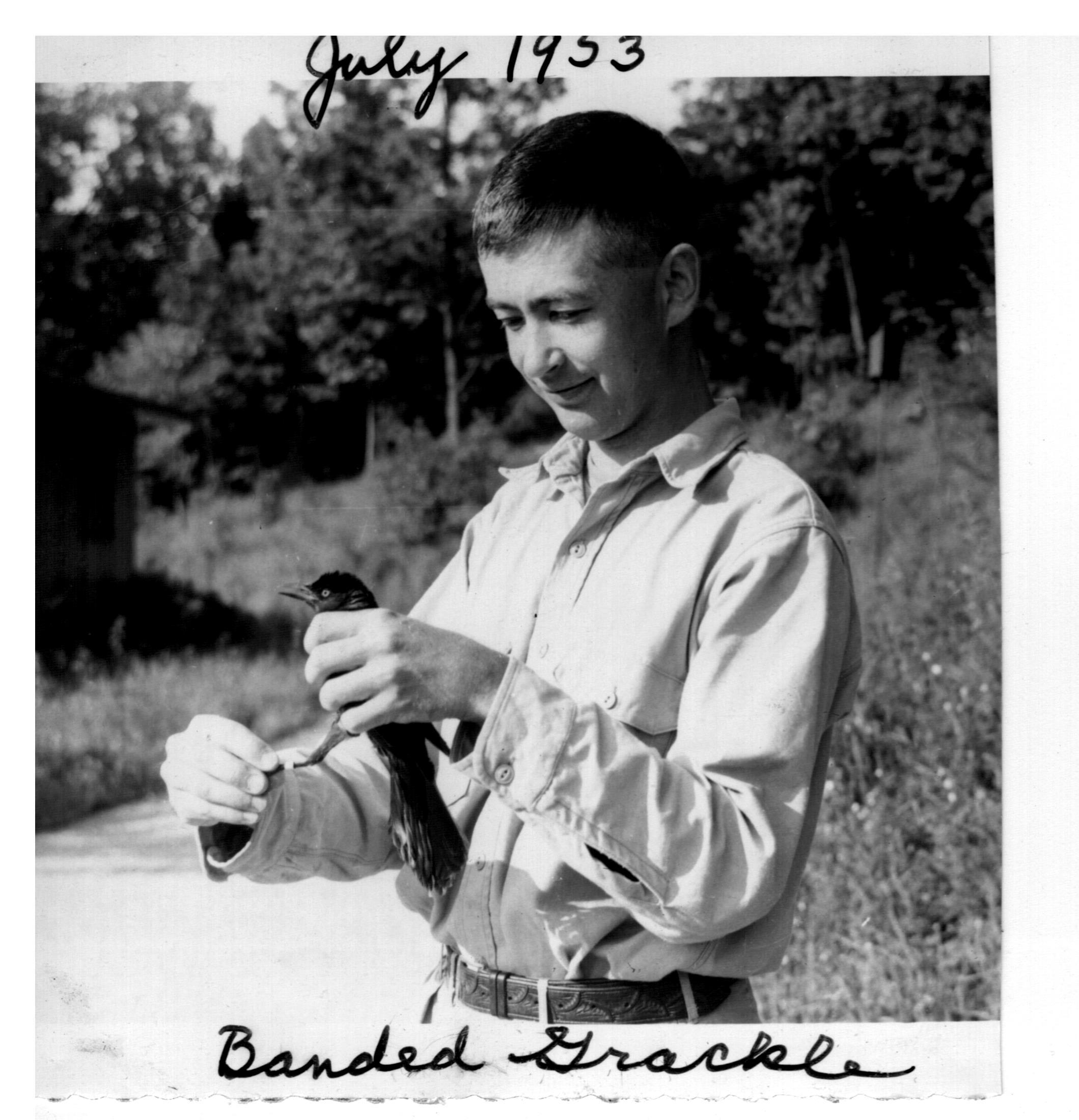
- Bergstrom holding a common grackle that he had banded in his yard in West Hartford, CT in 1953.
- Born: March 11, 1919; Boston, Massachusetts, U.S.
- Died: March 21, 1973 (aged 54); Hartford, Connecticut, U.S.
- Education: Harvard University
- Known for: Ornithology; Bird banding Conservation
- Spouse: Elizabeth Wasson
- Parent(s): Peter M. and Elizabeth Venable Bergstrom

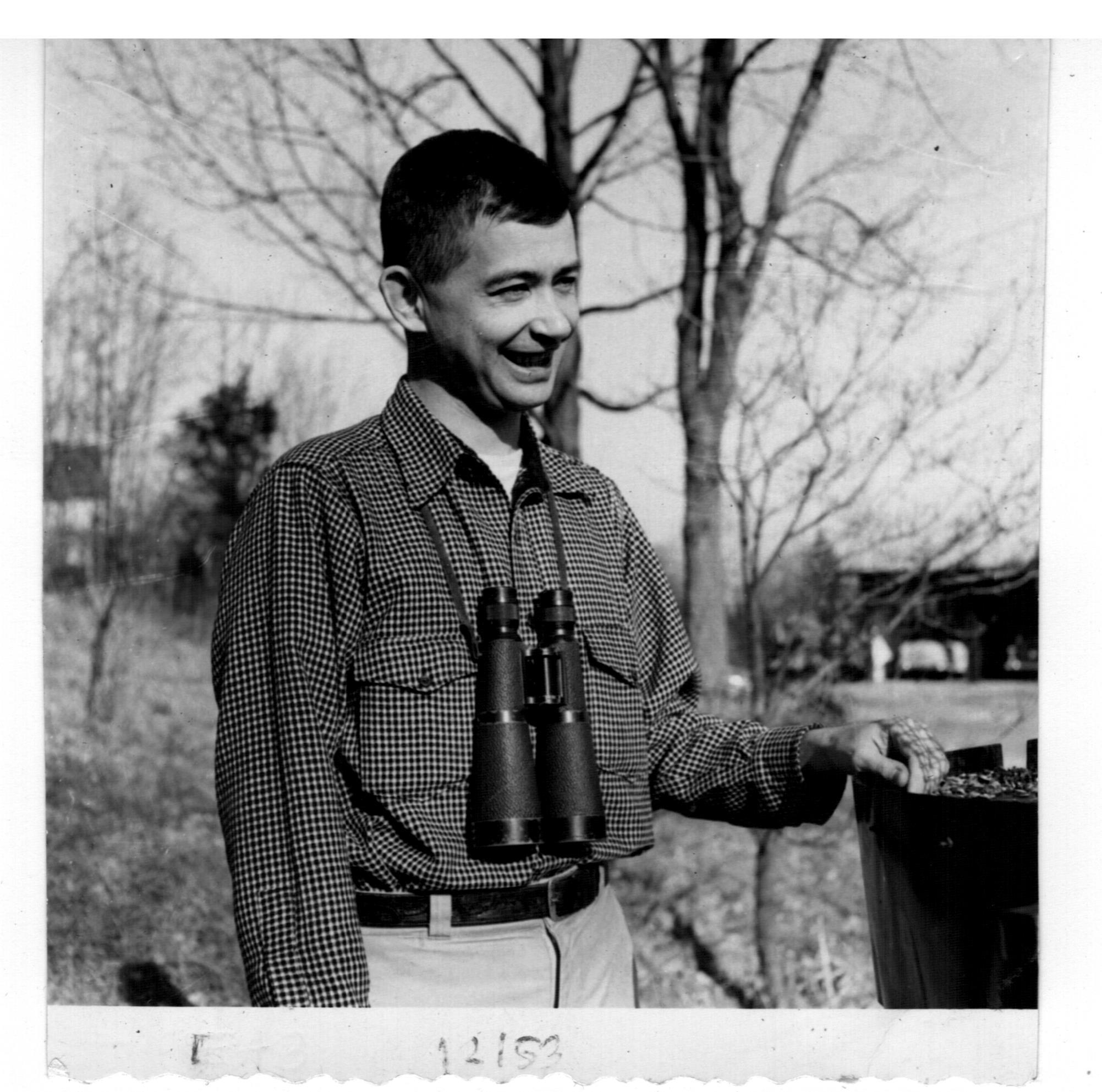
E. Alexander Bergstrom with his binoculars next to a trap he used for banding birds in his yard in West Hartford, CT in 1953.

Edward Alexander Bergstrom (March 11, 1919 – March 21, 1973) was an ornithologist, scientific journal editor, and conservationist, doing all of his work in these fields as a volunteer.

== Life ==
Edward Alexander Bergstrom was born in Boston, Massachusetts, the son of gardener and coachman Peter M. and governess Elizabeth Venable Bergstrom. He attended Harvard University where he received BA and MA degrees in history in 1939 (graduating Magna cum laude) and 1940 respectively, and worked on a doctorate in history until 1942.

While he was at Harvard, his passion for ornithology flourished; he birded with noted ornithologists Ludlow Griscom, William H. Drury, Wendell Taber, Allan Cruickshank, Chandler Robbins, Charles Foster Batchelder and others in the Nuttall Ornithological Club. He met his future wife, Elizabeth Wasson (daughter of Isabel Bassett Wasson), who was also a birder, at the Audubon Nature Camp in Medomak, Maine in 1940. They were married in 1943 and had five children, and he lived in West Hartford, Connecticut, for the rest of his life.

Bergstrom worked for Aetna Casualty & Surety Company (later called Aetna Life & Casualty and now Aetna, Inc.) in Hartford, Connecticut from 1943 until his death, starting as an underwriter and later (starting in 1964) working on a team to implement some of the first computer processing of automobile insurance claims.

Bergstrom's volunteer leadership roles in ornithology had a range of impacts from local to international. He was an active member of the Hartford Bird Study Club (now the Hartford Audubon Society), leading its bird banding program and serving as President from 1953 to 1955. He was editor of the scientific journal Bird-Banding (now the Journal of Field Ornithology) from 1950 to 1971 and Vice-President of the Northeastern Bird-Banding Association (NEBBA; now the Association of Field Ornithologists) from 1971 to 1973, which published Bird-Banding and its successor. From 1956 until his death in 1973, he imported and sold mist nets to bird banders from around the world for NEBBA, and served as their Assistant Treasurer, with the proceeds from the net sales supporting their publications. He was also an active bird bander, banding over 35,000 birds in his lifetime, many of them in his own yard, and publishing several papers about his research on birds. After his death, NEBBA established the E. Alexander Bergstrom Memorial Research Award in his honor to fund research on birds.

Bergstrom was also a conservation advocate. He was a charter member of the West Hartford Conservation Commission, chair from 1963 to 1966, and a member through 1969. He was also President of the Connecticut Association of Conservation Commissions (now the Connecticut Association of Conservation and Inland Wetlands Commissions). He was instrumental in getting West Hartford to purchase and develop the Spicebush Swamp as a nature preserve, and also helped the Hartford Audubon Society obtain its 90-acre (360,000 m^{2}) Lewis Farm Bird Sanctuary in Suffield, CT.

Bergstrom died on March 21, 1973.
