= Hartford Audubon Society =

American non-profit organization

The Hartford Audubon Society
- Type: Non-profit organization
- Purpose: Wildlife conservation and education
- Region served: Hartford County, Connecticut
- Website: hartfordaudubon.org

The Hartford Audubon Society, founded in 1909, is nonprofit organization dedicated to wildlife conservation and education. Hartford Audubon manages several wildlife sanctuaries, participates in conservation advocacy, conducts bird censuses, and offers field trips, lectures, and other programming. It is a partner in the Hartford Urban Bird Treaty and the Connecticut Bird Atlas.

== History ==
The Hartford Audubon Society was founded in 1909 as the Hartford Bird Study Club. The club's initial aims included advancing ornithological knowledge, protecting birds, and "interesting the general public" in the welfare of birds. The club began offering lectures on birds and conservation in 1909 and guided walks in 1911. It started the Hartford Christmas Bird Count in 1909.

The club has participated in conservation advocacy since 1909, including advising senator George P. McLean on the Migratory Bird Treaty Act.

Club members began bird banding in the 1920s, which flourished under E. Alexander Bergstrom’s leadership in the 1940s–1960s.

The club changed its name to the Hartford Audubon Society, Inc. in 1965. The organization's mission has broadened beyond birds to emphasize wildlife conservation.

== Wildlife sanctuaries ==
Hartford Audubon manages four wildlife sanctuaries.

- Station 43, nine acres, a freshwater wetland marsh located along the Connecticut River in South Windsor. Station 43 is an Important Bird Area, a Connecticut Natural Area, and a special focus area of the Silvio O. Conte National Fish and Wildlife Refuge.
- Greenstone Hollow Nature Preserve, 38 acres, East Granby.
- Lewis Farm Bird Sanctuary, 90 acres, Suffield.
- Tobacco Valley Wildlife Refuge, South Windsor.

Former sanctuaries:

- Idlenot Farm, Ellington and South Windsor.
- Cedar Mountain Preserve, 2,500 acres, Newington, organized with the Connecticut State Fish and Game Commission in 1916.

== Members ==
- John Hall Sage (1847–1925), the first honorary president of the Hartford Bird Study Club and a field trip leader following 1911.
- E. Alexander Bergstrom (1919–1973), president of the Hartford Bird Study Club from 1953 to 1955 and chair of its bird banding committee.
