= USS Harrison (DD-573) =

Fletcher-class destroyer

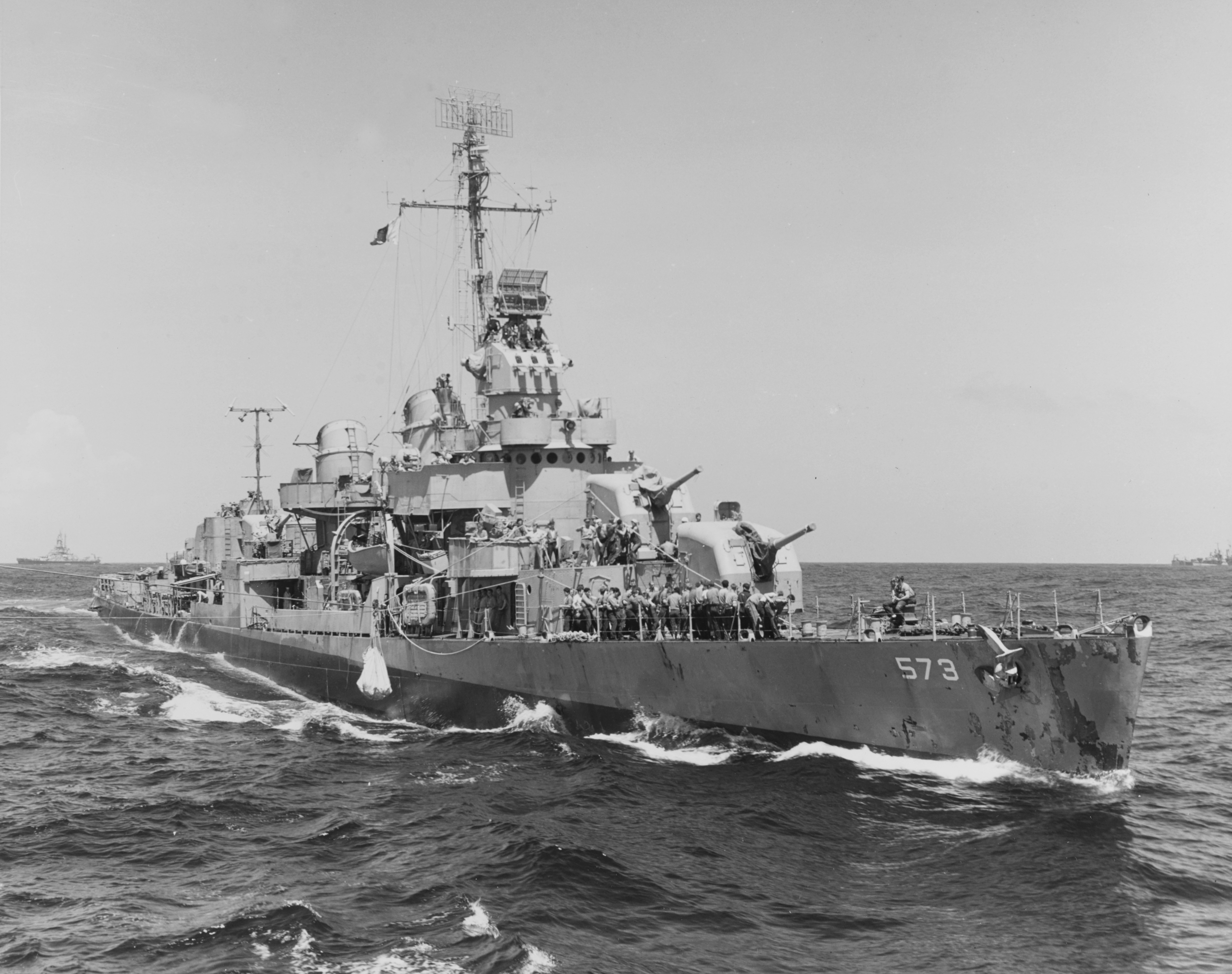
- USS Harrison alongside USS McKee, 5 March 1945.

History

United States
- Name: USS Harrison
- Namesake: Napoleon Harrison
- Builder: Consolidated Steel Corporation, Orange, Texas
- Laid down: 25 June 1941
- Launched: 4 May 1942
- Sponsored by: Mrs. Harry B. Hird
- Commissioned: 25 January 1943
- Decommissioned: 1 April 1946
- Stricken: 1 May 1968
- Identification: Hull number: DD-573
- Fate: Sold as-is to Mexico, 19 Aug 1970

Mexico
- Name: ARM Cuauhtémoc
- Acquired: 19 August 1970
- Decommissioned: 1982
- Identification: Pennant number: E01
- Fate: dismantled

General characteristics
- Class & type: Fletcher-class destroyer
- Displacement: 2,050 tons
- Length: 376 ft 6 in (114.76 m)
- Beam: 39 ft 8 in (12.09 m)
- Draft: 17 ft 9 in (5.41 m)
- Propulsion: 60,000 shp (45,000 kW); propellers
- Speed: 35 knots (65 km/h; 40 mph)
- Range: 6,500 nmi (12,000 km; 7,500 mi) at 15 knots (28 km/h; 17 mph)
- Complement: 273
- Armament: 5 x 5 in (130 mm) guns; 4 × 40 mm AA guns; 4 × 20 mm AA guns; 10 × 21-inch (533 mm) torpedo tubes; 6 × depth charge projectors; 2 × depth charge tracks

USS Harrison (DD-573) was a Fletcher-class destroyer of the United States Navy. She was second Navy ship of that name.

== Namesake ==
Napoleon Bonaparte Harrison was born on 19 February 1823 in Martinsburg, Virginia (now West Virginia). He was appointed a midshipman on 26 February 1838 and received promotion to passed midshipman on 20 May 1844. Serving in California during the Mexican–American War on USS Portsmouth, he was a volunteer in the expedition to rescue General Philip Kearny's command, and spent five days en route from San Francisco to Monterey in a small boat carrying despatches.

He was promoted to master on 2 April 1852 and then to Lieutenant on 6 January 1853. From 1857 to 1859, he served as a division officer aboard USS Cumberland during the sloop-of-war's tour as flagship of the U.S. Navy's Africa Squadron. In April 1862, Harrison commanded the gunboat USS Cayuga at the Battle of Forts Jackson and St. Philip, leading the battle line past the forts and up the Mississippi River to New Orleans. He was promoted to Commander on 16 July 1862. He later commanded the gunboat USS Mahaska in the James River Flotilla, the frigate USS Minnesota in the North Atlantic Blockading Squadron and various ships in the South Atlantic Blockading Squadron. After the fall of Charleston in 1865, he served at the Portsmouth Navy Yard, Kittery, Maine.

Following the Civil War, he taught at the United States Naval Academy. He was promoted to captain on 28 April 1868 and served as Commandant of Midshipmen in 1868–1870, before taking command of his last ship, the sloop USS Congress. He died on 27 October 1870 at Key West, Florida.

== Construction and commissioning ==
Harrison was launched by Consolidated Steel Corporation, Orange, Tex., 4 May 1942, sponsored by Mrs. Harry B. Hird; and commissioned 25 January 1943.

== 1943 ==
Following shakedown training in the Gulf of Mexico and Caribbean, Harrison escorted a merchant ship to the Panama Canal Zone, and sailed for New York. The ship arrived New York 6 April and Charleston 2 days later. She then joined a convoy out of New York for Casablanca, and after touching at several points in the Mediterranean returned 1 June to Charleston. Harrison was then assigned to anti-submarine exercises in Caribbean waters with carrier USS Yorktown (CV-10), after which she performed escort duty in the area until 22 July 1943.

Harrison was assigned in mid-1943 to the Pacific Fleet, where the crescendo of amphibious war was beginning. Departing with carrier USS Lexington (CV-16) from Norfolk, Virginia 22 July, the ship arrived Pearl Harbor 9 August and spent the next days training for the important amphibious operations which were to come. Her job was to screen the carriers as their aircraft softened up Japanese-held islands, and the task group got underway 22 August for strikes against Marcus, Wake, and Tarawa, interspersed with short resupply stops at Pearl Harbor. With these vital preliminary operations complete, Harrison departed 21 October for duty in the Solomons, long the scene of bitter fighting both on land and sea.

She arrived Espiritu Santo, New Hebrides, 4 November and departed the next day, arriving at Empress Augusta Bay on 7 November, Bougainville, to screen transports carrying reinforcements. As she patrolled off the bay, where Marines had landed 1 November, the Japanese launched a fierce night attack with dive bombers and torpedo planes 8–9 November. Harrison's gunners accounted for at least one plane during the battle. The destroyer departed 14 November for the Gilberts operation and again screened transports as they put initial assault troops ashore 20 November. Harrison remained off "bloody Tarawa" until 29 November, when she took up patrol off Makin. The ship then sailed to Funafuti 7 December and engaged in training exercises before anchoring at Pearl Harbor 1 January 1944. She remained in Hawaiian waters for most of January taking part in fire support exercises for impending invasion of the Marshall Islands.

== 1944 ==
Harrison sailed with the Southern Attack Force 22 January, and arrived off Kwajalein 31 January. She screened battleships USS New Mexico (BB-40) and USS Mississippi (BB-41) while the larger ships pounded shore installations, and sank a small tanker with her guns as the Japanese ship attempted to escape from the lagoon. As the Marines landed on Kwajalein and advanced over the numerous islands in the atoll, Harrison entered the lagoon 4 February and rendered close fire support. She spent the next 4 weeks patrolling offshore and anchored in the lagoon, departing 1 March for Efate, New Hebrides.

The destroyer arrived Efate 7 March and after a short rest screened a task group during the strike on Kavieng, New Ireland, 20 March. Returning to Efate 25 March, she joined some 200 ships for the largest operation yet attempted in the southwest Pacific, the occupation of Hollandia. Harrison arrived New Guinea 1 April, engaged in patrol and escort operations until 19 April, and then sailed to Humboldt Bay for the assault. Carriers screened by the destroyer and her sisters bombarded enemy airfields and supported the successful landing, after which Harrison arrived Port Purvis on Florida Island in the Solomons on 11 May for a month of local exercises and patrols.

Next on the timetable of conquest in Micronesia were the Marianas, and Harrison sailed 4 June for the Marshalls to prepare for that operation. Arriving Kwajalein 8 June, she engaged in patrolling and readiness operations until 17 June, when she sailed for Guam. Harrison arrived 21 July and lent fire support to Marines ashore in addition to patrolling the transport areas. This operation not only constituted a break in Japan's inner ring of defenses, but dealt a death blow to the Empire's naval air arm at the Battle of the Philippine Sea. Harrison sailed back to Espiritu Santo via Eniwetok 16 August.

Harrison departed 22 August for New Guinea, where she supported with gunfire Rear Admiral Barbey's landing on Morotai Island 15 September. After helping to establish this important air base, the destroyer joined a larger task force at Humboldt Bay and departed 13 October for one of the largest operations of the war, the invasion of the Philippines. Harrison arrived off Leyte 20 October and delivered accurate shore fire for the assault forces during the initial stages. She then assumed escort duties in already crowded Leyte Gulf until returning to Humboldt Bay 23 October.

== 1945 ==
After her many long months in the Pacific forward areas, Harrison departed for the United States 1 November and arrived Mare Island Naval Shipyard, California, via Pearl Harbor, 24 November 1944. She remained there until departing again for Pearl Harbor 20 January 1945. Arriving Ulithi 7 February, Harrison joined Vice Admiral Marc Mitscher's famed Fast Carrier Task Force (then Task Force 58, of the 5th Fleet), and in company with USS Hornet (CV-12), USS Wasp (CV-18), and other carriers sailed three days later to stage the first strike on the mainland of Japan since the Halsey-Doolittle raid of 1942. Observing the strictest secrecy to insure success, the carriers and their escorts arrived off Japan 16 February and launched a devastating series of strikes against the Tokyo area. After these attacks, the vast force moved south to support the Iwo Jima landings, scheduled for the 19th, and remained east of the island until returning for another raid on Tokyo 25 February. Refueling at sea in a remarkable demonstration of the mobility and striking power of carrier forces, the ships then sailed to Okinawa for photo-reconnaissance missions 1 March. This completed, Harrison and the rest of the task force arrived Ulithi 5 March 1945.

The great task force sortied once more from Ulithi 14 March to support the Okinawa operation, last stop on the island road to Japan. In heavy strikes 18–19 March the carrier forces inflicted great damage on Okinawa in preparation for the invasion, and Harrison shot down another attacking enemy aircraft. Attacks against Japanese airfields in the home islands were also launched, cutting down significantly the air opposition over Okinawa during the initial assault. After the Marines stormed ashore 1 April, the carrier groups and their destroyers turned to direct support of the landing. As a Japanese task force, built around the giant battleship Yamato, sortied from the inland sea to attack the beaches at Okinawa, TF 58 aircraft delivered a skillful and effective attack, sinking Yamato and five other ships while suffering only small losses.

During her operations off Okinawa Harrison began to experience increasing kamikaze attacks. Harrison's gunners accounted for two of the suicide planes 6 April, and protected the carriers during countless attacks in the days following the invasion. She returned to Ulithi 30 April for a brief respite, but was underway again 9 May for tactical support of the American forces on bitterly contested Okinawa. The task force, now part of 3d Fleet, continued this pattern, including periodic strikes against Japan, until after the great June typhoon. Harrison rode out the storm 5 June in which USS Pittsburgh (CA-72) lost her bow and the ships put in at Leyte Gulf 11 June to repair damage.

After replenishing the great task force moved once more toward Japan 1 July. During the next 2 months, devastating air strikes were carried out against Japan, and retaliatory air attacks were fought off by Harrison and the other protecting destroyers. Refueling at sea, the carriers kept up a constant bombardment of the home islands. In addition, Harrison with four cruisers and five other destroyers made an anti-shipping sweep along the northern coast of Honshū; but, testifying to the thoroughness of American surface and submarine attrition, gained not one contact. Then during the night of 30–31 July Harrison and the rest of her squadron swept Suruga Wan, near Tokyo, and in the very shadow of Mount Fuji bombarded railroad yards and an aluminum plant.

Task Force 38 kept up its relentless attacks against Japan until the surrender 15 August. Harrison arrived at Guam 26 August and Pearl Harbor 14 September. There the veteran destroyer got underway with carrier USS Enterprise (CV-6) for the Panama Canal Zone and the East Coast, arriving Boston 17 October 1945. After Navy Day celebrations in Boston the ship arrived Charleston 3 November and decommissioned in reserve 1 April 1946. Harrison was shifted to Philadelphia in 1965 and Orange, Texas, in 1968.

Harrison received 11 battle stars for World War II service.

== BAM Cuauhtemoc (E-01) ==
The ship was sold as-is to Mexico 19 Aug 1970. She served in the Mexican Navy as BAM Cuauhtemoc (E-01), named after Cuauhtémoc (c.1502–1525), the last Aztec emperor of the Mexica. She was taken out of service in 1982.
