= William Parker (Medal of Honor) =

- Born: circa 1832; Boston
- Military career
- Allegiance: United States
- Branch: United States Navy
- Rank: Captain of the Afterguard
- Units: USS Cayuga; USS San Francisco (C-5)
- Conflicts: American Civil War • Battle of Forts Jackson and St. Philip
- Awards: Medal of Honor

William Parker (born c. 1832, date of death unknown) was a Union Navy sailor in the American Civil War and a recipient of the U.S. military's highest decoration, the Medal of Honor, for his actions at the Battle of Forts Jackson and St. Philip.

Born about 1832 in Boston, Parker was still living in that city when he joined the Navy. He served during the Civil War as a captain of the afterguard on the USS Cayuga. At the Battle of Forts Jackson and St. Philip near New Orleans on April 24, 1862, he was stationed at the ship's wheel and "conscientiously performed his duties" despite heavy fire. For this action, he was awarded the Medal of Honor a year later on April 3, 1863.

Parker's official Medal of Honor citation reads:

At the wheel on board the U.S.S. Cayuga during the capture of Forts St. Philip and Jackson, and New Orleans, 24 and 25 April 1862. As his ship led the advance column toward the barrier and both forts opened fire simultaneously, striking the vessel from stem to stern, Parker conscientiously performed his duties throughout the action in which attempts by 3 rebel steamers to butt and board were thwarted, and the ships driven off. Eleven gunboats were successfully engaged and the enemy garrisons forced to surrender during this battle in which the Cayuga sustained 46 hits.

In 1894, Parker was a sailmaker's mate newly assigned to the USS San Francisco (C-5). He was arrested for drunkenness while ashore in Brooklyn that year and court-martialed. Members of the court learned that Parker was a Medal of Honor recipient when he wore his dress uniform, complete with medal, to the trial. The court found Parker guilty but handed down no punishment.
