= Edward Wright (Medal of Honor) =

- Born: c. 1829; New York City
- Died: February 17, 1901 (aged 71–72)
- Burial place: Kew Gardens, Queens, New York City
- Military career
- Allegiance: United States
- Branch: United States Navy
- Rank: Quartermaster
- Unit: USS Cayuga
- Conflicts: American Civil War • Battle of Forts Jackson and St. Philip
- Awards: Medal of Honor

Edward Wright (c. 1829 – February 17, 1901) was a Union Navy sailor in the American Civil War and a recipient of the U.S. military's highest decoration, the Medal of Honor, for his actions at the Battle of Forts Jackson and St. Philip.

Born in about 1829 in New York City, Wright was still living in the state of New York when he joined the Navy. He served during the Civil War as a quartermaster on the USS Cayuga. At the Battle of Forts Jackson and St. Philip near New Orleans on April 24, 1862, he "conscientiously performed his duties throughout the action". For his part in the battle, he was awarded the Medal of Honor a year later on April 3, 1863.

Wright's official Medal of Honor citation reads:

On board the U.S.S. Cayuga during the capture of Forts St. Philip and Jackson and the taking of New Orleans, 24 and 25 April 1862. As his ship led the advance column toward the barrier and both forts opened fire simultaneously, striking the vessel from stem to stern Wright conscientiously performed his duties throughout the action in which attempts by 3 rebel steamers to butt and board were repelled, and the ships driven off or forced to surrender. Eleven gunboats were successfully engaged and the enemy garrisons captured during this battle in which the Cayuga sustained 46 hits.

Wright died on February 17, 1901, at age 71 or 72 and was buried in Kew Gardens, Queens, in his home of New York City.
