= Portland Brownstone Quarries =

- U.S. National Register of Historic Places
- U.S. National Historic Landmark
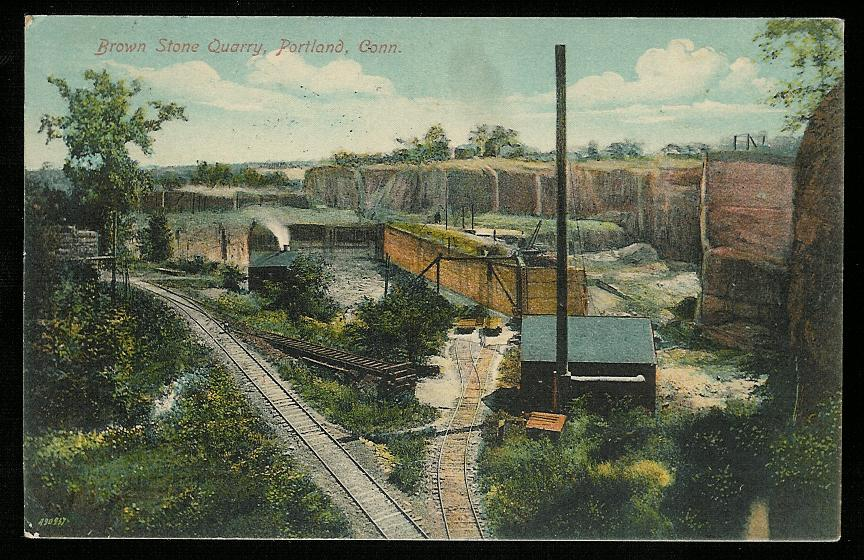

- Location within Connecticut Location within the United States
- Location: Brownstone Avenue and Silver Street, Portland, Connecticut
- Coordinates: 41°34′32″N 72°38′36″W
- NRHP reference No.: 00000703

Significant dates
- Added to NRHP: May 16, 2000
- Designated NHL: May 16, 2000

The Portland Brownstone Quarries are a set of historic quarries in Portland, Connecticut. The brownstone mined from these quarries was an important source for construction in the latter half of the 19th century. The stone from these quarries was used in a number of landmark buildings in Chicago, Boston, New York City, Philadelphia, Baltimore, Washington, D.C., New Haven, Connecticut, and Hartford. The site was listed as a National Historic Landmark, which also placed it on the National Register of Historic Places, on May 16, 2000.

== Early history of the quarry ==
Quarrying on this site began in 1690 by James Stanclift, who contracted with the town of Middletown to build stonework in exchange for a deed of land. Commercial quarrying started in 1783 when the Brainerd Quarry Company began operations. During the peak of the brownstone era, more than 1500 workers were employed by the quarries, which shipped stone on their own ships for eight months out of the year. Proceeds from the quarrying business were deeded to Wesleyan University from 1833 through 1884, and stone from the quarries was used to build many campus buildings. As tastes in buildings shifted, and concrete became the material of choice, the demand for brownstone declined. A flood in 1936 and a hurricane in 1938 flooded the quarries, ending their operations. All efforts to drain the flooded quarries have been unsuccessful; one theory is that the floods opened some underground springs, making it impossible to effectively drain the quarries.

== Current use of the quarry site ==
In 1994, a new operator, Connecticut Brownstone Quarries, began a small-scale quarrying operation to provide stone for restoration of brownstone buildings.

The town purchased the historic quarries and 42 acres (170,000 m^{2}) of adjacent land in 1999 and 2000.

A modern-day view of Brownstone Exploration and Discovery Park.

The quarries have been leased for development as a recreation center and is currently being operated by Brownstone Exploration & Discovery Park, with the hope that awareness of the historic landmark will strengthen the local economy.

Over the years the park has gradually expanded its attractions to include scuba diving, climbing and rappelling, swimming, snorkeling, canoeing and kayaking, hiking, mountain biking, wake boarding, cliff jumping, giant inflatable toys, and challenge courses for group team building. All activities are currently available except for the campground - which is currently under construction.

There are also plans to offer educational programs at the site. Scuba diving is becoming a popular recreational use within the park, with divers coming from all over Connecticut and even some from out of state.

Zip lines
Brownstone Park installed two zip lines that cut across the quarry in July 2007. The first line goes from the west side of the park to the peninsula at the center of the park. The second line travels south along the west side of the quarry. The lines are 750 and 780 feet (240 m) long respectively. For the 2010 season, the Park added another two zip lines, one of which is only accessible by climbing up a 65-foot rock wall.

Water slide
Brownstone Park installed a 100-foot (30 m) water slide in July 2007.

Water toys
A variety of water toys including kayaks, canoes, launchers, trampolines and windsurfers are available.

Wake boarding
Several wake boarding lines are available, along with expert jumps and rails. Complimentary beginning lessons are included in the day pass.

== See also ==
- List of National Historic Landmarks in Connecticut
- National Register of Historic Places listings in Middlesex County, Connecticut
