= Henry Gildersleeve (shipbuilder) =

American shipbuilder

Henry Gildersleeve (c. 1817–1894), was a 19th-century American shipbuilder involved in the construction of 120 vessels of all types. He was born in Gildersleeve, Connecticut (now part of Portland, Connecticut), on April 7, 1817, in the family homestead on Indian Hill Avenue. He died of heart disease on April 9, 1894, in his residence that he built in 1853 on Main Street in Gildersleeve. At age 17, Gildersleeve left school and went to work in his father's shipyard. In 1842 he was taken into partnership with his father (Sylvester Gildersleeve) under the firm name of S. Gildersleeve & Son. Henry Gildersleeve was part owner of many of the larger ships and schooners built by the yard and amassed a considerable fortune during the times the American merchant marine was in its glory.

== Ship construction ==
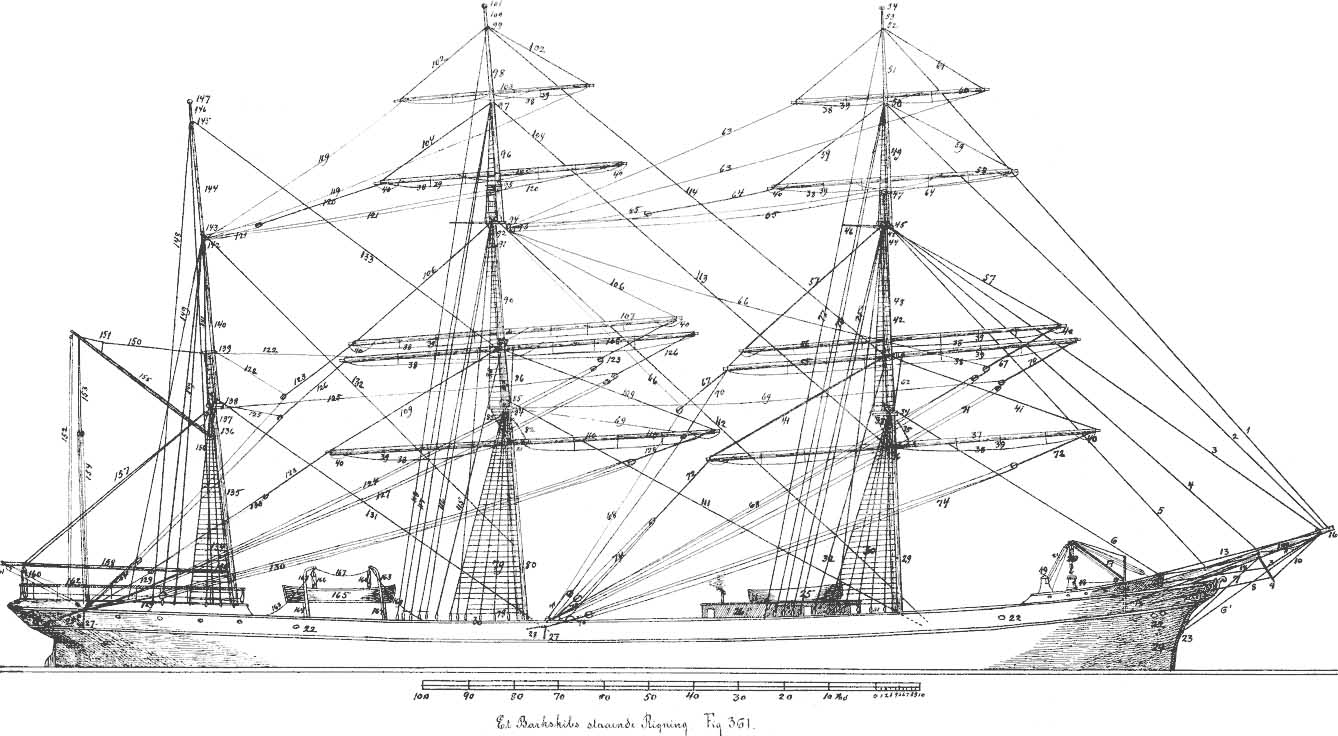
Rigging of a three-masted barque

From 1834 to 1890, the period during which he was actively interested in the Gildersleeve shipyard, there were built 9 sloops, 46 schooners, 4 brigs, 6 barques, 11 ships, one pilot boat, one gunboat, 7 oil barges, 9 ice barges, and 26 coal, sand and cotton barges, making a total of 75 sailing vessels, 14 steamers and 31 barges, for a combined total of 120 crafts, costing $2,100,000, being an average cost of $17,500.

The most expensive sailing ships built by S. Gildersleeve & Son were the S. Gildersleeve, of fifteen hundred tons, built in 1854 at a cost of $59,000 and the National Guard of fifteen hundred tons, built in 1857 at a cost of $55,000.

== Steam craft ==
Henry Gildersleeve built his first propeller driven steamer in 1856. It was 275 tons and cost $20,000. He was part owner. The Gildersleeves built the United States gunboat Cayuga in 1861 at a cost of $125,000.

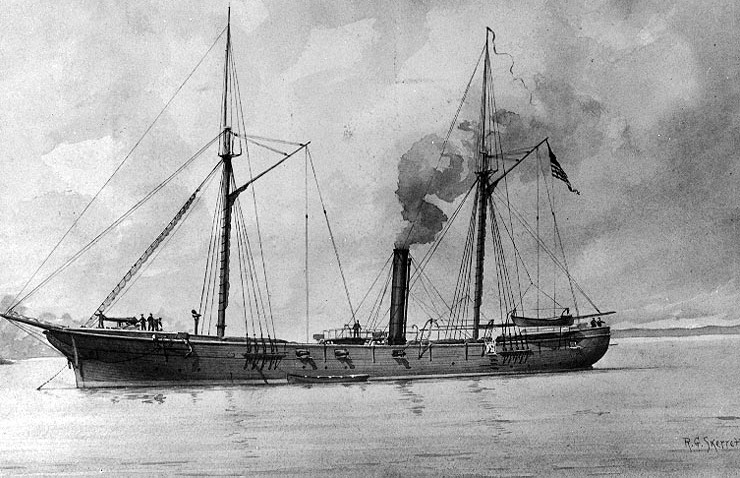
The United States gunboat Cayuga, built by S. Guildersleeve & Sons in 1861.

The most expensive vessel of any type built by Gildersleeve was the steamship United States of sixteen hundred tons, costing $150,000, built in 1864.

In 1873, the steamship City of Dallas, costing $110,000, was built for the Mallory Line running from New York to Galveston, Texas. In 1863, he built his first steamship, America, 900 tons, costing $85,000, in which he was also a part owner.

== Public life ==
In December, 1872, Henry Gildersleeve associated himself with the house of Bentley, Gildersleeve & Co., shipping and commission merchants. South Street. New York. At the end of ten years, he retired from the firm in favor of his son Sylvester. He was a director in the Hartford Steamboat Co., and president of the Middletown Ferry Co., First National Bank and Freestone Savings Bank of Portland, Ct., being a trustee 1881–1894. He became a communicant of Trinity Episcopal church in 1848, was an active member and a liberal supporter, being a member of the building committee, contributing much to its erection. In 1861–1862, he represented the Democratic Party in the State Legislature from Portland. Besides his shipbuilding interests, he owned a large farm in Gildersleeve, raising tobacco and also hay from Gildersleeve Island, a part of the town of Cromwell.

== Family ==
Children by first wife (Nancy Buckingham, born October 22, 1812; married March 29, 1839; died March 14, 1842): Emily Shepard, born March 27, 1840; died March 2, 1842; Philip, born February 1, 1842; died June 12, 1884.

Children by his second wife (Emily Finette Smith, born September 27, 1819; married May 25, 1843; died November 11, 1873): Oliver, born March 6, 1844; died July 26, 1912; Emily Shepard, born September 8, 1846; Mary Smith, born March 8, 1848; died October 18, 1851; Anna Sophia, born February 26, 1850; died August 27, 1854; Sylvester, born November 24, 1852; died June, 1898; Louisa Rebecca, born May 9, 1857; Henry, born September 4, 1858.

Child by third wife (Amelia Warner, born November 8, 1837; married June 12, 1875; died October 22, 1903): Orren Warner, born November 26, 1878.

== Footnotes ==
Citations
