= Portland, Connecticut =

- Town
- Town of Portland
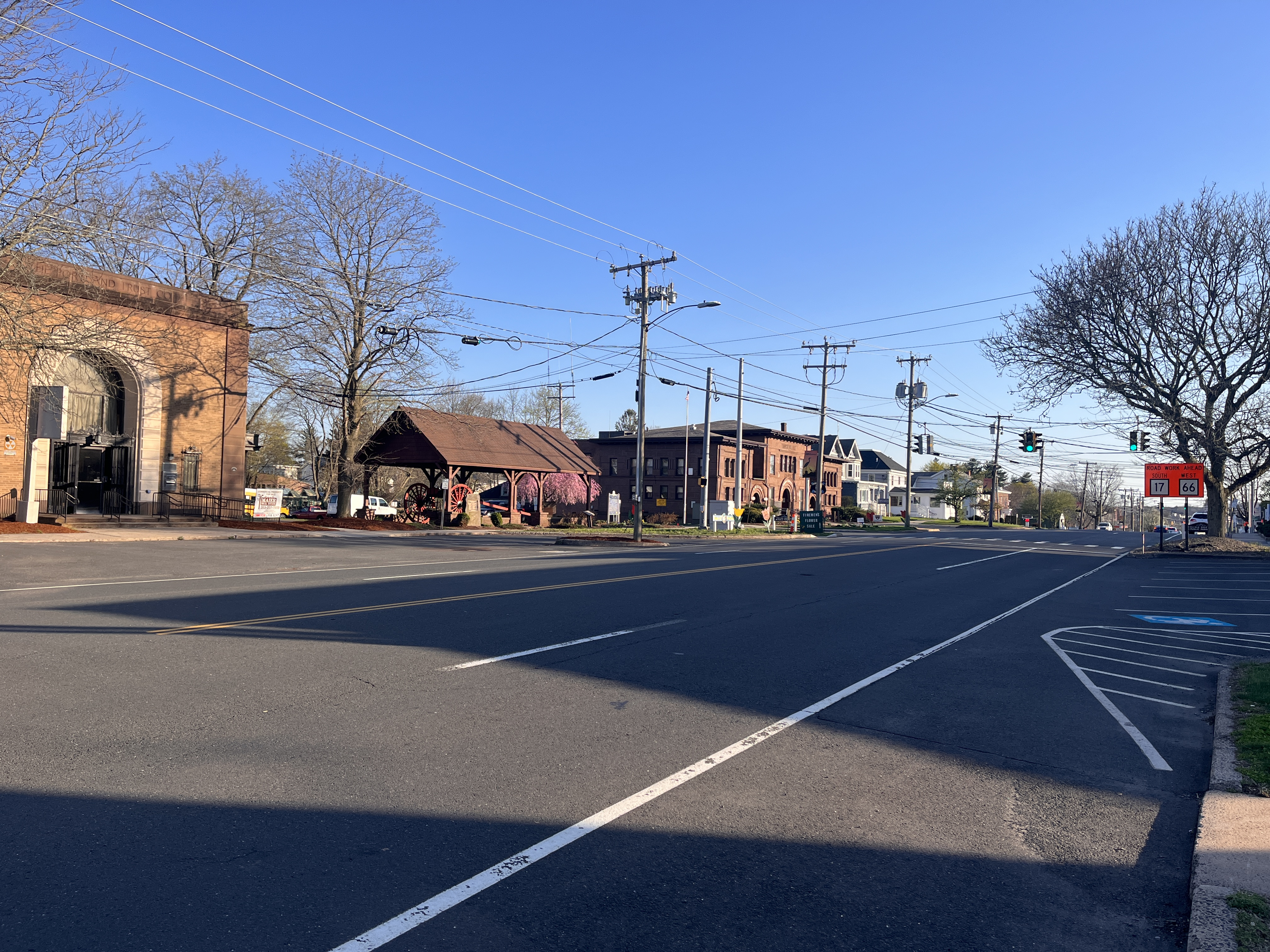
- Main Street in Portland facing toward the town hall

- Seal
- Nickname: Quarry Town
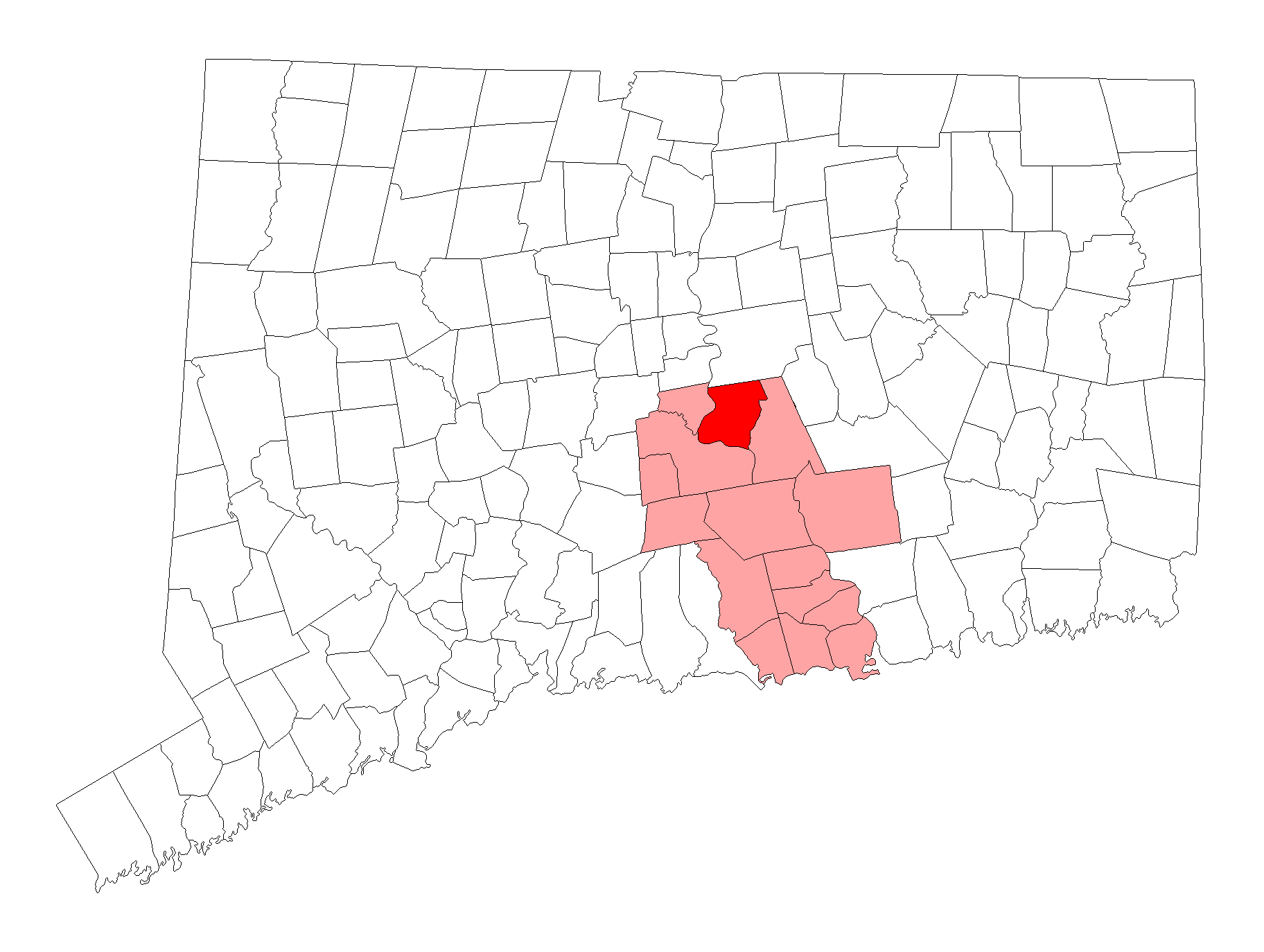
- Coordinates: 41°34′21″N 72°38′26″W
- Country: United States
- U.S. state: Connecticut
- County: Middlesex
- Region: Lower CT River Valley
- Incorporated: 1841

Government
  - Type: Selectman-town meeting
  - First selectman: Michael Pelton (R)
  - Selectmen: Andrea Alfano (D); John Dilton (D); Robert Hetrick Jr. (R); David Kuzminski (D); Vincent Pitruzzello (R); James Tripp (D)

Area
  - Total: 24.9 sq mi (64.5 km^{2})
  - Land: 23.4 sq mi (60.6 km^{2})
  - Water: 1.5 sq mi (3.8 km^{2})
- Elevation: 157 ft (48 m)

Population (2020)
  - Total: 9,384
  - Density: 401/sq mi (154.9/km^{2})
- Time zone: UTC−5 (Eastern)
  - Summer (DST): UTC−4 (Eastern)
- ZIP Code: 06480
- Area codes: 860/959
- FIPS code: 09-61800
- GNIS feature ID: 0213491
- Website: www.portlandct.org

Portland (/ˈpɔːrtlənd/ PORT-lənd) is a town in Middlesex County, Connecticut, United States. The town is part of the Lower Connecticut River Valley Planning Region. The population was 9,384 at the 2020 census. The town center is listed as a census-designated place (CDP). It is situated across the Connecticut River from Middletown.

Brownstone quarried in Portland was used in the construction of Hartford's Old State House in 1796. The vast majority of the brownstone buildings in Connecticut (see College Row at Wesleyan University and the Long Walk at Trinity College) as well as the famous brownstones in New York City were built with brownstone from Portland's quarries. Later, one of the quarries was transformed into an adventure park in the summer months featuring zip lines, cliff diving and scuba locations.

About half of the town's perimeter is made up of the Connecticut River. The town has eight marinas and boat clubs as well as three 18-hole golf courses.

== History ==
The Wangunk tribe lived in the area prior to European settlement, and lived in Portland continuously throughout the settler period. Wangunk descendants still live in the area today. Their name referred to the bend in the Connecticut River which curves around half of the town's perimeter.

=== Settlement to the nineteenth century ===
The first European settlers came to Portland in the 1690s. They were attracted by brownstone, which was used both for construction and for gravestones. Proximity to the river meant that the stone could be transported far and wide, and the Portland brownstone quarries supplied to New York, Boston and even San Francisco, Canada and England. By the 1850s, more than 1,500 people were employed in the quarry industry. More than 25 ships transported the stone. By the 1850s, shipbuilding became more important as an industry, and the economic center of town shifted toward the Gildersleeve area. Immigrants from Ireland, then Sweden, then (to a lesser extent) Italy came to town to work the quarries.

It originally was part of Middletown and then known as East Middletown. In 1767, Chatham, which then included Portland and East Hampton, was founded.

The town was a part of Chatham until 1841, when it became separate. Its name comes from Portland, England, a place famous for its freestone quarries.

Portland's oldest church is the First Congregational Church. In 1710 a meeting was held for the building of a meetinghouse for preaching. The Connecticut General Assembly approved "parish privileges" in 1714. After a vociferous controversy, a location for the new "Third Ecclesiastical Society of Middletown" meetinghouse was decided upon at "Hall Hill". On October 25, 1721, Rev. Daniel Newell, the first pastor, was ordained. The Bristol, Connecticut native and Yale College graduate died in 1731. In 1748 a new meetinghouse was built, and in 1843 the name of the society was changed to the "First Ecclesiastical Society of Portland."

=== Late nineteenth and twentieth centuries ===
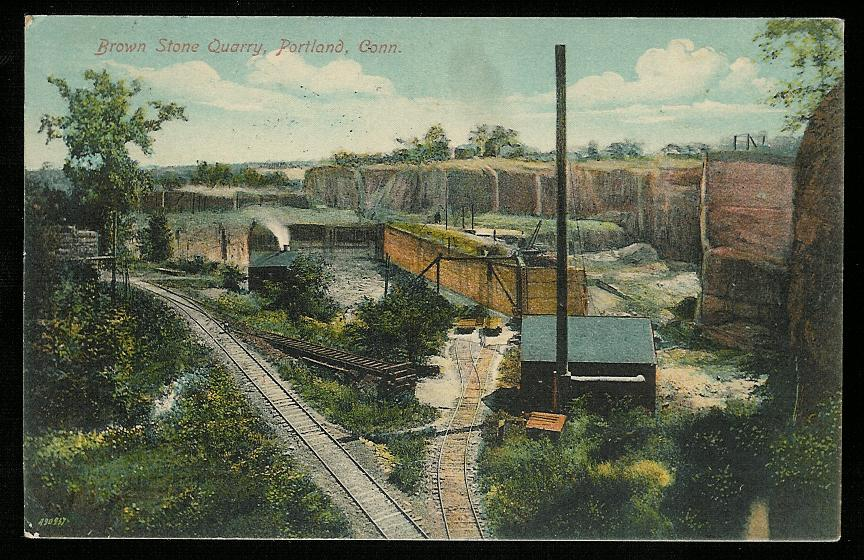
Brownstone quarry, c. 1911

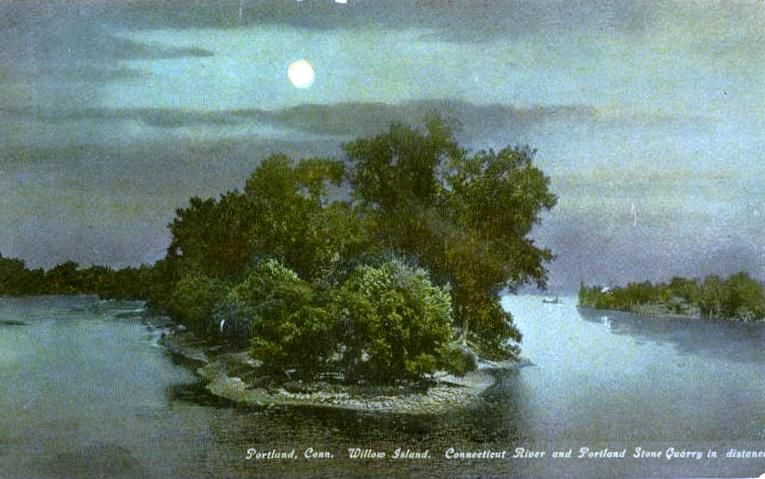
Willow Island, 1910 postcard

Before quarrying became the town's chief industry in the nineteenth century, Portland was known for its shipbuilding. The Gildersleeve village in town is associated with the Gildersleeve family, prominent shipbuilders in the 1800s. The first vessel built in town was launched in 1741. During the American Revolution and the War of 1812 many U.S. Navy vessels were built in various shipyards in town. Tinware and enamelware were produced in town in the late nineteenth century. Tobacco farming has also been a big industry in the town. During the American Civil War a number of vessels were also constructed in Portland, such as the steamship USS Guard (1857) and the bark USS J. C. Kuhn (1859).

In 1895, the town decided to establish a public library, although private libraries had been in town for more than a century. The Portland Library was originally a room in Town Hall with about 800 books after the private Portland Library Association turned over all of its books. Within months of its establishment, Horace B. Buck, a native resident who later moved to Worcester, Massachusetts, donated $2,000 toward the erection of a separate library building, and the town appropriated another $1,000. Shaler & Hall and Brainerd Quarries contributed the brownstone, and before the building was finished, Buck gave another $500 (after his death, his estate gave another $2,500). The library moved into another building in 1981.

In the early twentieth century, brownstone could not compete much with concrete, and the industry went into decline. In 1936, the Connecticut River flooded the quarries, effectively ending the industry in town. Shipbuilding also collapsed at this time.

== Geography ==
According to the United States Census Bureau, the town has a total area of 24.9 square miles (64 km^{2}), of which 23.4 square miles (61 km^{2}) is land and 1.5 square miles (3.9 km^{2}) (5.99%) is water. The town center CDP has a total area of 5.5 square miles (14 km^{2}), of which 4.9 square miles (13 km^{2}) is land and 0.5 square miles (1.3 km^{2}) (9.71%) is water. The village of Gildersleeve also lies within Portland.

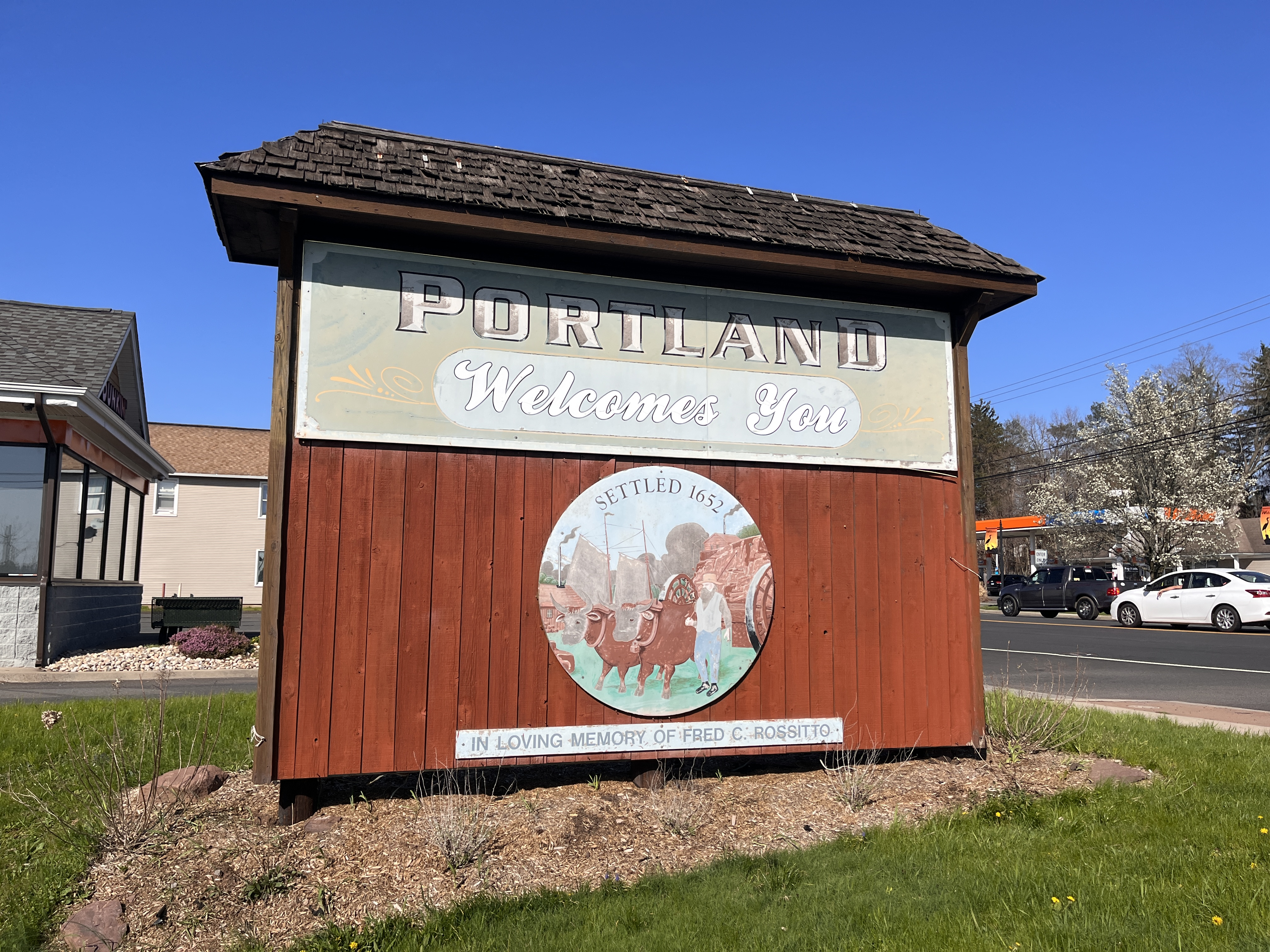
A sign welcoming people to Portland

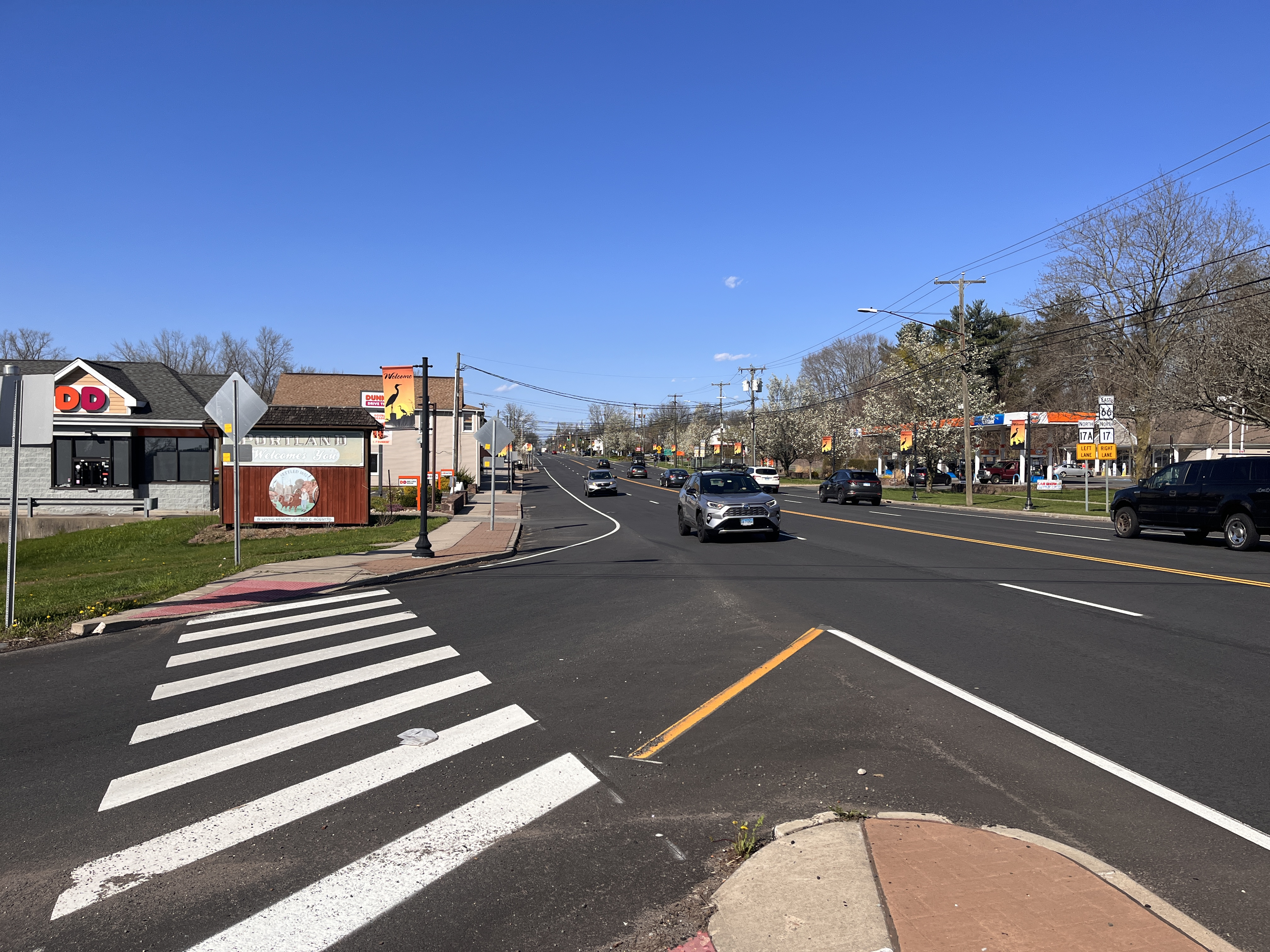
Portland town center as seen from the intersection of Main Street and Silver Street

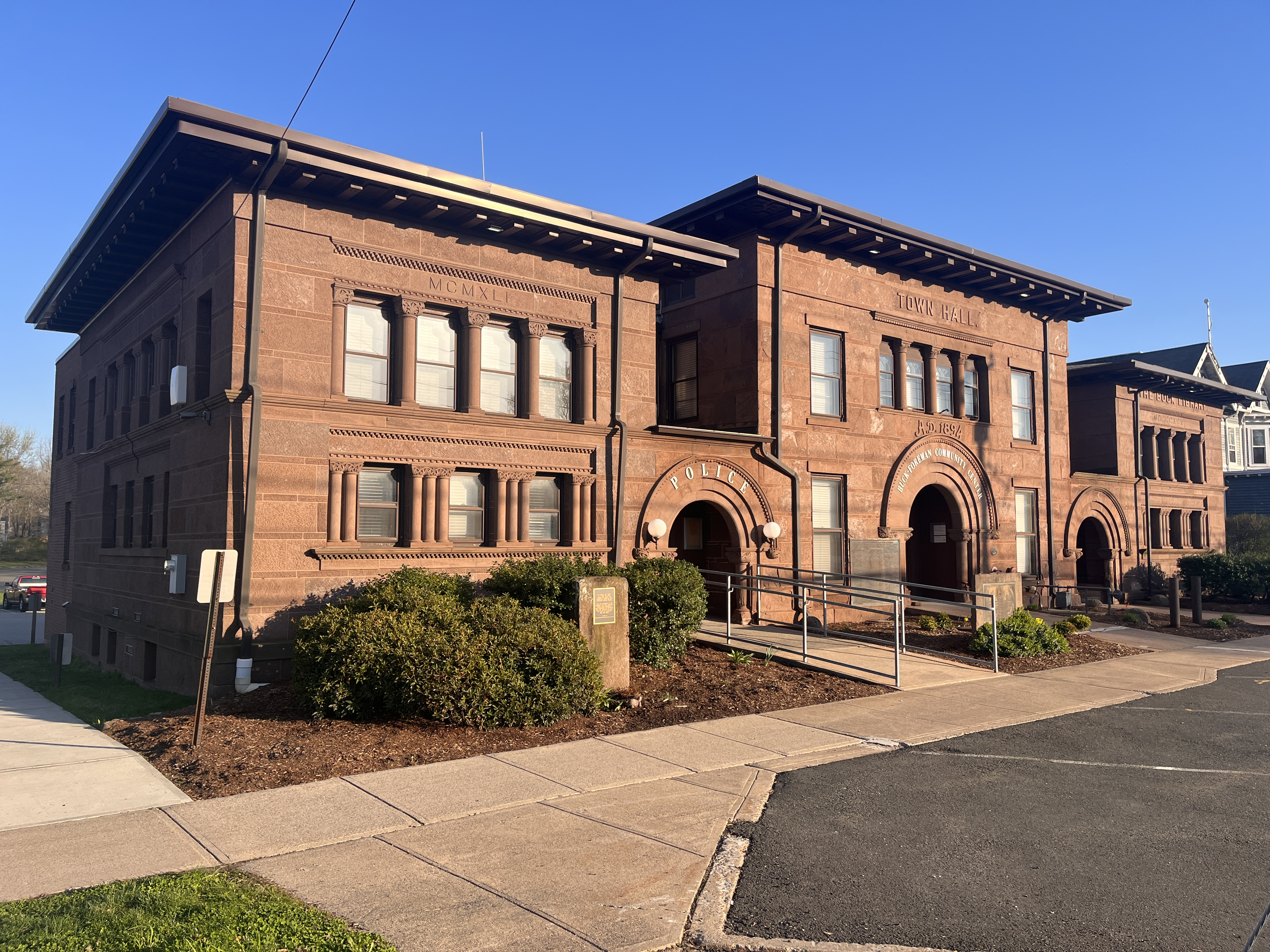
Portland town hall, which also houses the town's police department

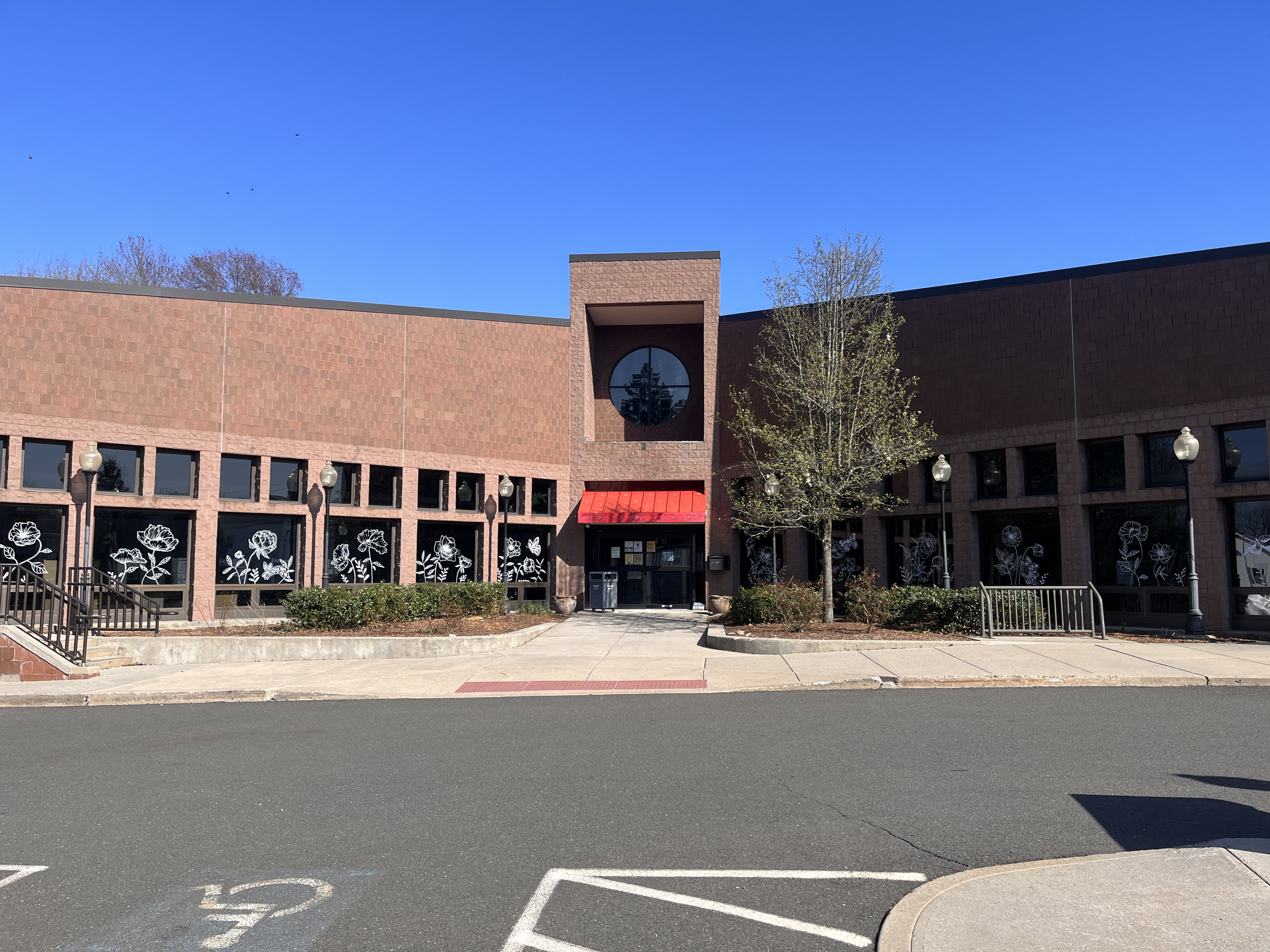
The entrance to Portland Library

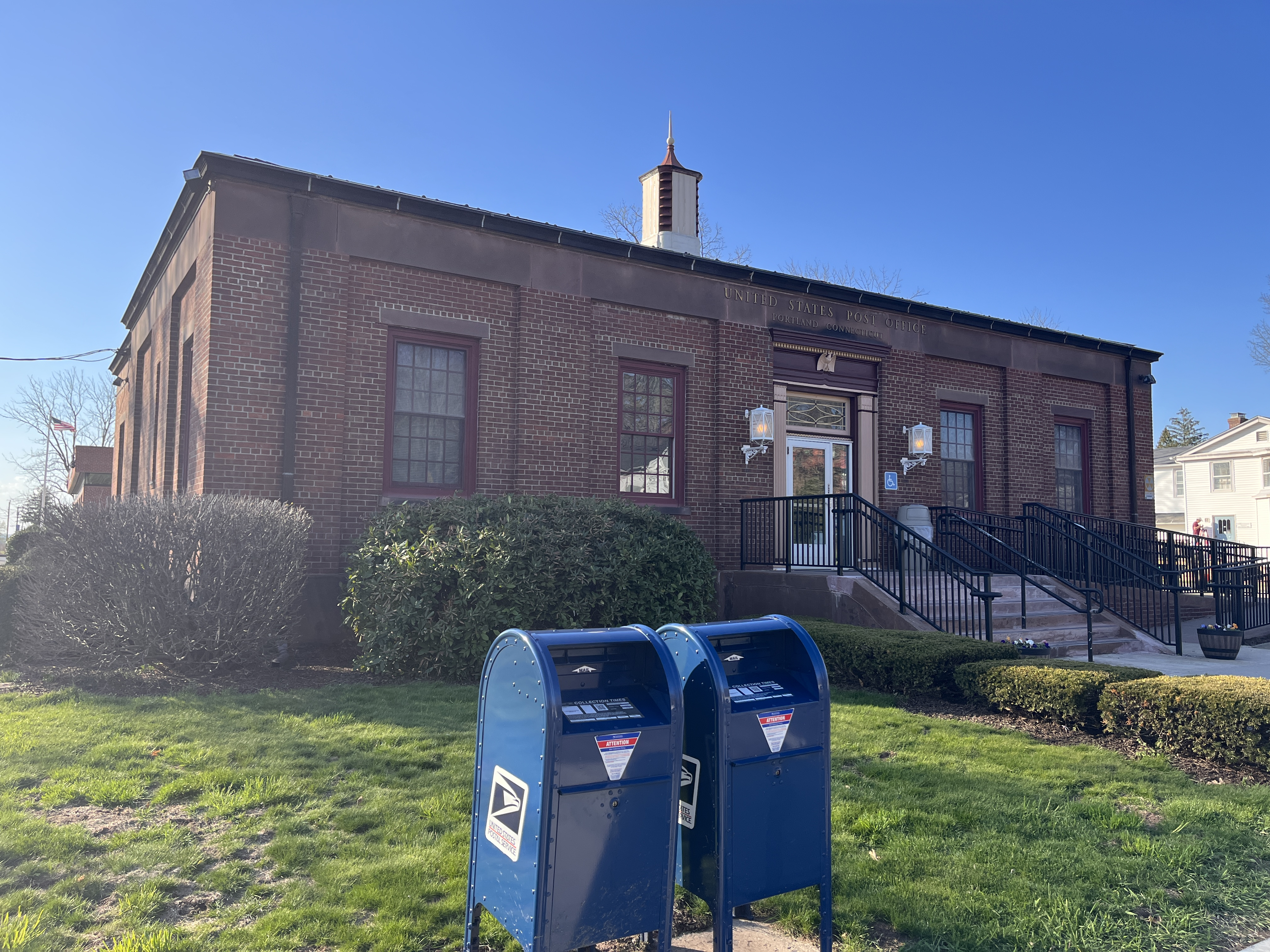
Portland Post Office

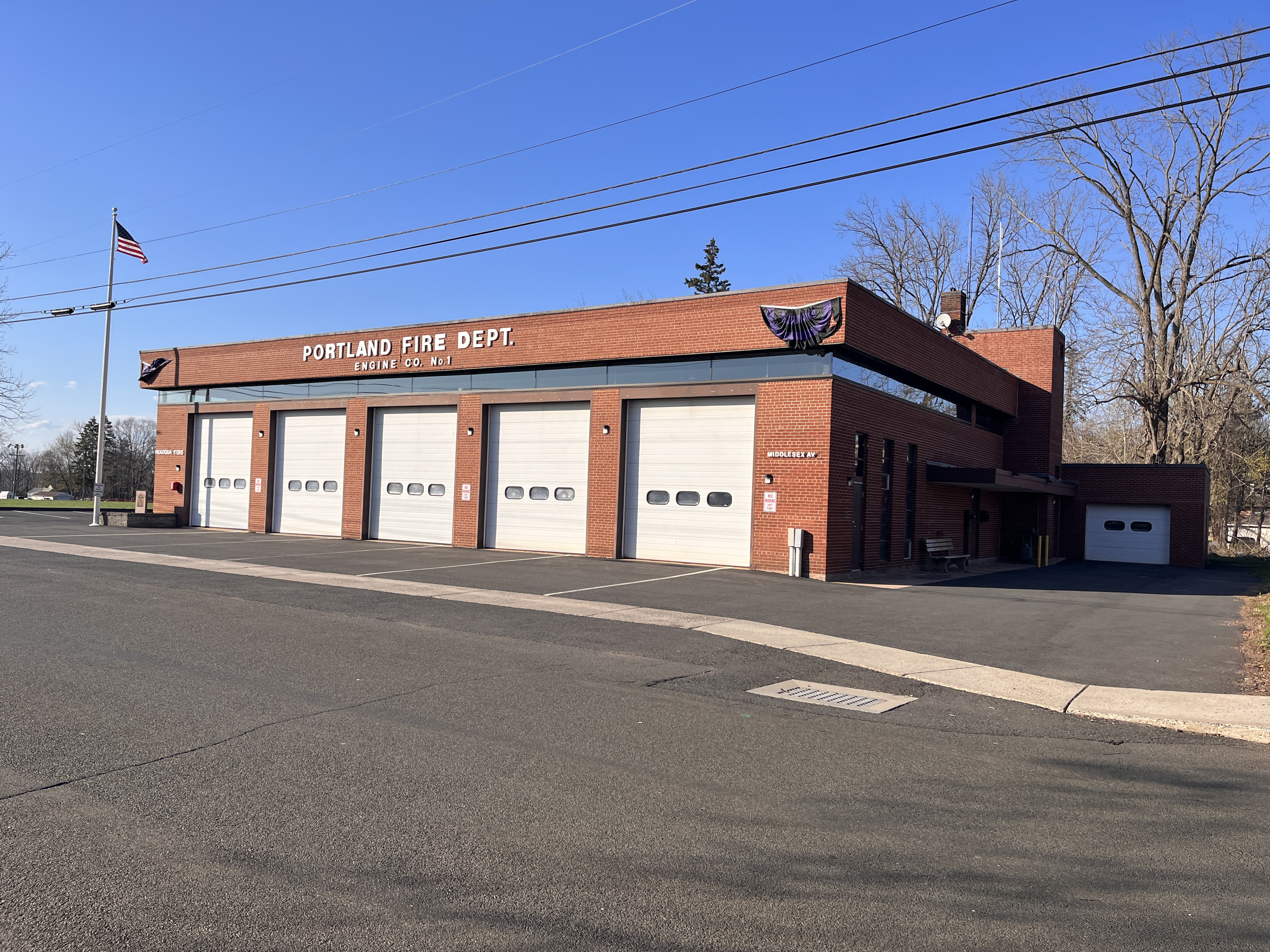
Portland Fire Department

=== Climate ===
Climate data for Portland, Connecticut
Month	Jan	Feb	Mar	Apr	May	Jun	Jul	Aug	Sep	Oct	Nov	Dec	Year
Record high °F (°C)	70 (21)	74 (23)	86 (30)	93 (34)	99 (37)	100 (38)	101 (38)	102 (39)	101 (38)	89 (32)	83 (28)	75 (24)	102 (39)
Mean daily maximum °F (°C)	36 (2)	39 (4)	48 (9)	60 (16)	70 (21)	79 (26)	84 (29)	82 (28)	75 (24)	63 (17)	52 (11)	41 (5)	61 (16)
Mean daily minimum °F (°C)	18 (−8)	22 (−6)	29 (−2)	40 (4)	49 (9)	59 (15)	65 (18)	63 (17)	54 (12)	42 (6)	35 (2)	24 (−4)	42 (5)
Record low °F (°C)	−17 (−27)	−24 (−31)	−4 (−20)	11 (−12)	25 (−4)	39 (4)	45 (7)	38 (3)	29 (−2)	18 (−8)	5 (−15)	−12 (−24)	−24 (−31)
Average precipitation inches (mm)	3.15 (80)	2.75 (70)	3.57 (91)	3.88 (99)	3.89 (99)	3.99 (101)	4.00 (102)	3.66 (93)	3.48 (88)	4.14 (105)	3.84 (98)	3.35 (85)	43.7 (1,111)

== Demographics ==
Historical population
Census	Pop.	Note	%±
1850	2,836		—
1860	3,657		28.9%
1870	4,693		28.3%
1880	4,157		−11.4%
1890	4,687		12.7%
1900	3,856		−17.7%
1910	3,425		−11.2%
1920	3,644		6.4%
1930	3,930		7.8%
1940	4,321		9.9%
1950	5,186		20.0%
1960	7,496		44.5%
1970	8,812		17.6%
1980	8,383		−4.9%
1990	8,418		0.4%
2000	8,732		3.7%
2010	9,508		8.9%
2020	9,384		−1.3%
U.S. Decennial Census

At the 2000 census there were 8,732 people in 3,388 households, including 2,419 families, in the town. The population density was 373.1 inhabitants per square mile (144.1/km^{2}). There were 3,528 housing units at an average density of 150.7 per square mile (58.2/km^{2}). The racial makeup of the town was 95.12% White, 2.44% Black or African American, 0.16% Native American, 0.52% Asian, 0.03% Pacific Islander, 0.46% from other races, and 1.27% from two or more races. Hispanic or Latino of any race were 1.96%.

Of the 3,388 households 33.6% had children under the age of 18 living with them, 58.5% were married couples living together, 9.4% had a female householder with no husband present, and 28.6% were non-families. 24.1% of households were one person and 10.4% were one person aged 65 or older. The average household size was 2.52 and the average family size was 3.01.

The age distribution was 25.5% under the age of 18, 4.5% from 18 to 24, 30.7% from 25 to 44, 24.7% from 45 to 64, and 14.6% 65 or older. The median age was 39 years. For every 100 females, there were 95.0 males. For every 100 females age 18 and over, there were 91.4 males.

The median household income was $63,285 and the median family income was $73,036. Males had a median income of $48,849 versus $35,104 for females. The per capita income for the town was $28,229. About 3.0% of families and 5.1% of the population were below the poverty line, including 4.6% of those under age 18 and 8.9% of those age 65 or over.

=== Town center ===
At the 2000 census there were 5,534 people in 2,225 households, including 1,495 families, in the Portland census-designated place, comprising the town center and the adjacent neighborhood of Gildersleeve. The population density was 1,121.8 inhabitants per square mile (433.1/km^{2}). There were 2,286 housing units at an average density of 463.4 per square mile (178.9/km^{2}). The racial makeup of the CDP was 93.89% White, 3.22% Black or African American, 0.22% Native American, 0.54% Asian, 0.05% Pacific Islander, 0.56% from other races, and 1.52% from two or more races. Hispanic or Latino of any race were 2.29%.

Of the 2,225 households 29.8% had children under the age of 18 living with them, 51.4% were married couples living together, 11.4% had a female householder with no husband present, and 32.8% were non-families. 28.3% of households were one person and 13.0% were one person aged 65 or older. The average household size was 2.39 and the average family size was 2.94.

The age distribution was 23.7% under the age of 18, 5.1% from 18 to 24, 29.5% from 25 to 44, 23.9% from 45 to 64, and 17.9% 65 or older. The median age was 40 years. For every 100 females, there were 92.7 males. For every 100 females age 18 and over, there were 87.6 males.

The median household income was $55,949 and the median family income was $66,686. Males had a median income of $46,163 versus $30,402 for females. The per capita income for the CDP was $26,240. About 4.1% of families and 6.7% of the population were below the poverty line, including 5.8% of those under age 18 and 11.8% of those age 65 or over.

== Education ==
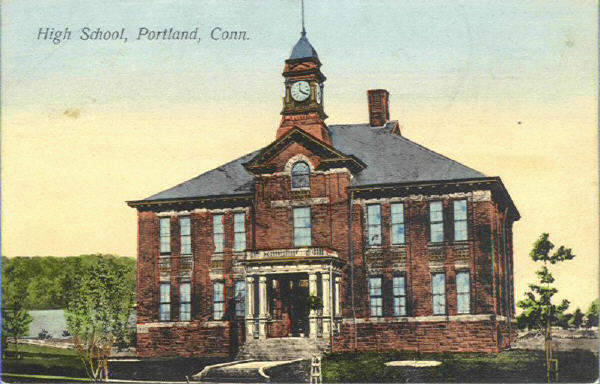
Central School, 1907. Originally the high school, it now houses the Town Hall and Board of Education.

The Portland Public School District consists of four schools: Portland High School & Middle School, Brownstone Intermediate School, Gildersleeve School and Valley View School. The district serves a total of 1,425 students.

In the early eighteenth and nineteenth centuries, schools were managed by school societies. These societies were abolished when the first Board of Education was elected in 1856. The area was divided into school districts.

Gildersleeve Hall, District 1, was built in 1876 and located on Main Street. It offered both elementary and high school. It was the first high school conducted in any town in Connecticut. When fire destroyed it in 1889, it was rebuilt on the same site. It continued to offer high school until 1899. It served students until 1958. It was demolished to make room for the third school on the site. Gildersleeve School opened in 1964 and still stands at 575 ½ Main Street. It now serves grades 3 and 4.

Central School District, District 2, included several schools between 1830 and 1979. The only remaining building is the Central School Building that is now the Town Hall located at 33 East Main Street. The Central School Building originally named Portland High School, offered high school courses in 1890 to seven pupils. It consolidated with Gildersleeve High School in 1899. It remained a school building until 1979. It became the Town hall in 2001.

District 3 was located on Rose Hill Road opposite the residence of Walter W Olsen. The Rose Hill School was the first school building in Portland and used until 1936 and is now a private residence. District 4, Penfield Hill School, 1830–1920, is now owned by Noyes School. District 5, Up City School, 1857–1921, on Glastonbury Road is now a residence. District 6, Pecausett School, 1830–1911, was located at the southwest corner of Grove Street and East Hampton Road. District 7, the Bucktown School, 1830–1872, was built on the eastern end of Cotton Hill Road.

The school currently known as the Brownstone Intermediate School, located at 314 Main Street, was opened in 1932 as the Junior-Senior High School. It was open to grades 7–12. Renovations were made to the school in 1953 and 1967. In 1960, it was renamed Portland Junior High School and then renamed again in 1989 to Portland Middle School where it housed grades 6 through 8. In 2004, it was renamed Brownstone Intermediate School and now houses grades 5 and 6.

Valley View Elementary School located at 81 High Street opened in 1954. An addition was completed in 1958. Valley View currently houses grades K–1.

Portland High School, located at 95 High Street, opened in 1960 as the new Senior High School. A large addition was completed in 1969 Renovations and a second addition were made to the high school and completed in 2004. The project included a large addition that houses the new Portland Middle School at 93 High Street. The middle school includes grades 7 and 8.

== Notable locations ==
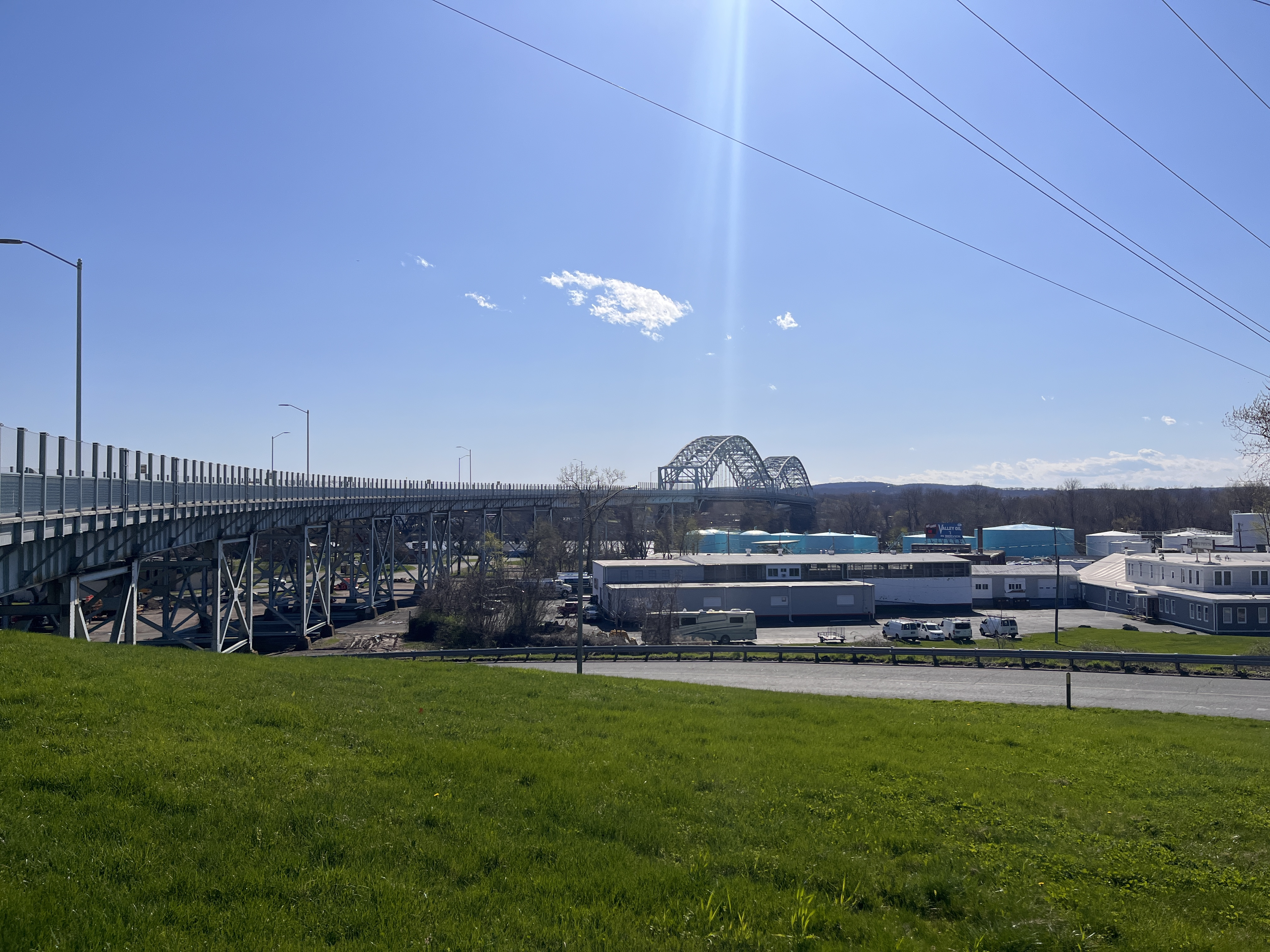
The Arrigoni Bridge as seen from near the Portland town center

- Arrigoni Bridge links Portland and Middletown, Connecticut.
- Portland Brownstone Quarries, a National Historic Landmark, which also placed it on the National Register of Historic Places, in 2000. It now serves as, "Brownstone Exploration and Discovery Park," with ziplining and various water activities.
- Providence & Worcester railroad bridge, featured prominently in the video for the 1993 Billy Joel hit "The River of Dreams".
- Williams and Stancliff Octagon Houses, located at 26 and 28 Marlborough Street and added to the National Register of Historic Places in 1976.

== Notable people ==
- Erin Brady (born 1987), beauty queen, Miss Connecticut USA, Miss USA 2013
- Julius L. Clarke (1828–1907), newspaper publisher and politician
- Willard Gildersleeve (1886–1976), college football coach
- Guy Hedlund (1884–1964), silent movie actor
- Oscar Hedstrom (1871–1960), co-founder of the Indian Motorcycle Company lived in town and is buried in Portland
- Joey Logano (born 1990), NASCAR Champion Driver
- Florence Fleming Noyes (1871–1928), dancer
- John Hall Sage (1847–1925), ornithologist
