= Ellett =

Ellett is the surname of the following people:

- David Ellett (born 1964), American-born Canadian professional ice hockey player
- Henry T. Ellett (1812–1887), Mississippi politician and U.S. Representative to Congress
- Neil Ellett (born 1944), Canadian soccer player
- Tazewell Ellett (1856–1914), Virginia politician and U.S. Representative to Congress
- Thomas Harlan Ellett (1880–1951), American architect
- Ron Ellett (born 1942) American football coach.

Ellet, an alternative spelling, is the surname of the following people:

- Alfred W. Ellet (1820–1895), American Civil War general and commander of a fleet of ironclad rams
- Charles Ellet Jr. (1810–1862), American civil engineer and Civil War officer
- Charles R. Ellet (1843–1863), American Civil War officer, son of Charles Ellet Jr.
- Elizabeth F. Ellet (1818–1877), American writer, historian, and poet
- John A. Ellet (1838–1892), U.S. Navy officer in the American Civil War
