= Ellet (surname) =

Ellet is a surname. Notable people with the surname include:

- Alfred W. Ellet (1820–1895), American civil engineer and United States Army general
- Charles Ellet Jr. (1810–1862), American civil engineer and United States Army officer
- Charles R. Ellet (1843–1863), American surgeon and Union Army officer
- Elizabeth F. Ellet (1818–1877), American writer, historian and poet
- John A. Ellet (1838–1892), American Union Army officer
