= Ellet =

Ellet may refer to:

- Ellet (surname)
- Ellet, Ohio, neighborhood in Akron, Ohio, United States
- Ellet High School, high school in Akron, Ohio
- USS Ellet (DD-398), Benham-class destroyer in the United States Navy

== People with the given name ==
- Ellet J. Waggoner (1855–1916), American Seventh-day Adventist
