= Charles Ellet =

Charles Ellet may refer to:

- Charles Ellet Jr. (1810–1862), civil engineer and colonel during the American Civil War
- Charles R. Ellet (1843–1863), his son, medical student who became a colonel in the Union Army during the American Civil War
