= USS T. D. Horner =

Tugboat of the United States Navy

History

United States
- Laid down: date unknown
- Launched: in 1859 at Brownsville, Pennsylvania
- Acquired: 18 May 1862
- In service: c. May 1862
- Out of service: at war’s end
- Stricken: 1865 (est.)
- Fate: Sold, 17 August 1865

General characteristics
- Displacement: 123 tons
- Length: not known
- Beam: not known
- Draught: not known
- Propulsion: steam engine; stern wheel-propelled
- Speed: not known
- Complement: not known
- Armament: two 12-pounder rifled guns

The USS T. D. Horner was a stern-wheel steamer built in 1859 at Brownsville, Pennsylvania and was part of Colonel Charles Ellet, Jr.'s United States Ram Fleet during the American Civil War.

== Civil War service ==
The ship was purchased by the War Department on 18 May 1862 for use on the Mississippi River and its tributaries in the Army's newly established flotilla which was popularly known as the "Ellet Ram Fleet."

Commanded and manned by Union Army personnel, this organization operated in the same waters as the Western Flotilla (later to become the Mississippi Squadron) which had been established the previous summer, also under Army auspices but commanded and manned by Navy personnel.

The relationship between these organizations, which often cooperated in carrying out their overlapping missions, was never completely clarified. However, at no time was the Ram Fleet, or were its ships, taken into the Navy. T. D. Horner served the Ram Fleet and its successor, the Mississippi Marine Brigade, as a tug until the latter was dissolved on 24 August 1864.

== Post war ==
After the Civil War ended, T. D. Horner was sold by the Government on 17 August 1865. She was re-documented for merchant service on 27 November 1865 and plied the Mississippi and its tributaries until New Year's Day 1868 when she hit a bridge at Louisville, Kentucky, and was damaged beyond economical repair.
