= Mississippi Marine Brigade =

Union Army amphibious unit

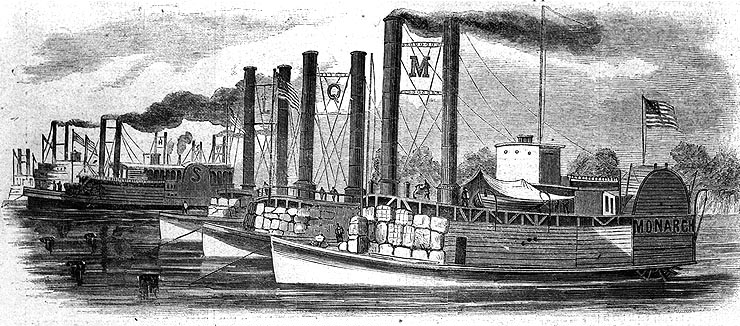
- The ram ships USS Monarch, USS Queen of the West, USS Lioness and USS Switzerland
- Active: 1862-1865
- Country: United States
- Branch: Army
- Type: Marines
- Role: Amphibious warfare
- Nickname(s): Ellet Ram Fleet
- Equipment: Steam powered naval rams
- Engagements: American Civil War: Vicksburg Campaign; Sinking of the USS Cairo; Battle of Arkansas Post; Yazoo Pass Expedition; Battle of Richmond, Louisiana; Battle of Goodrich's Landing

Commanders
- Notable commanders: Alfred W. Ellet

The Mississippi Marine Brigade was a Union Army amphibious unit which included the United States Ram Fleet and operated from November 1862 to August 1864 during the American Civil War. The brigade was established to act swiftly against Confederate forces operating near the Mississippi River and its tributaries. The brigade was commanded by Brigadier General Alfred W. Ellet and operated in coordination with the Mississippi River Squadron during the Union brown-water navy battle against the Confederate River Defense Fleet and land based forces. The brigade was independent of the Union Army and Navy and reported directly to the Secretary of War, Edwin M. Stanton. Despite the name, it was never part of the United States Marine Corps.

== Organization ==
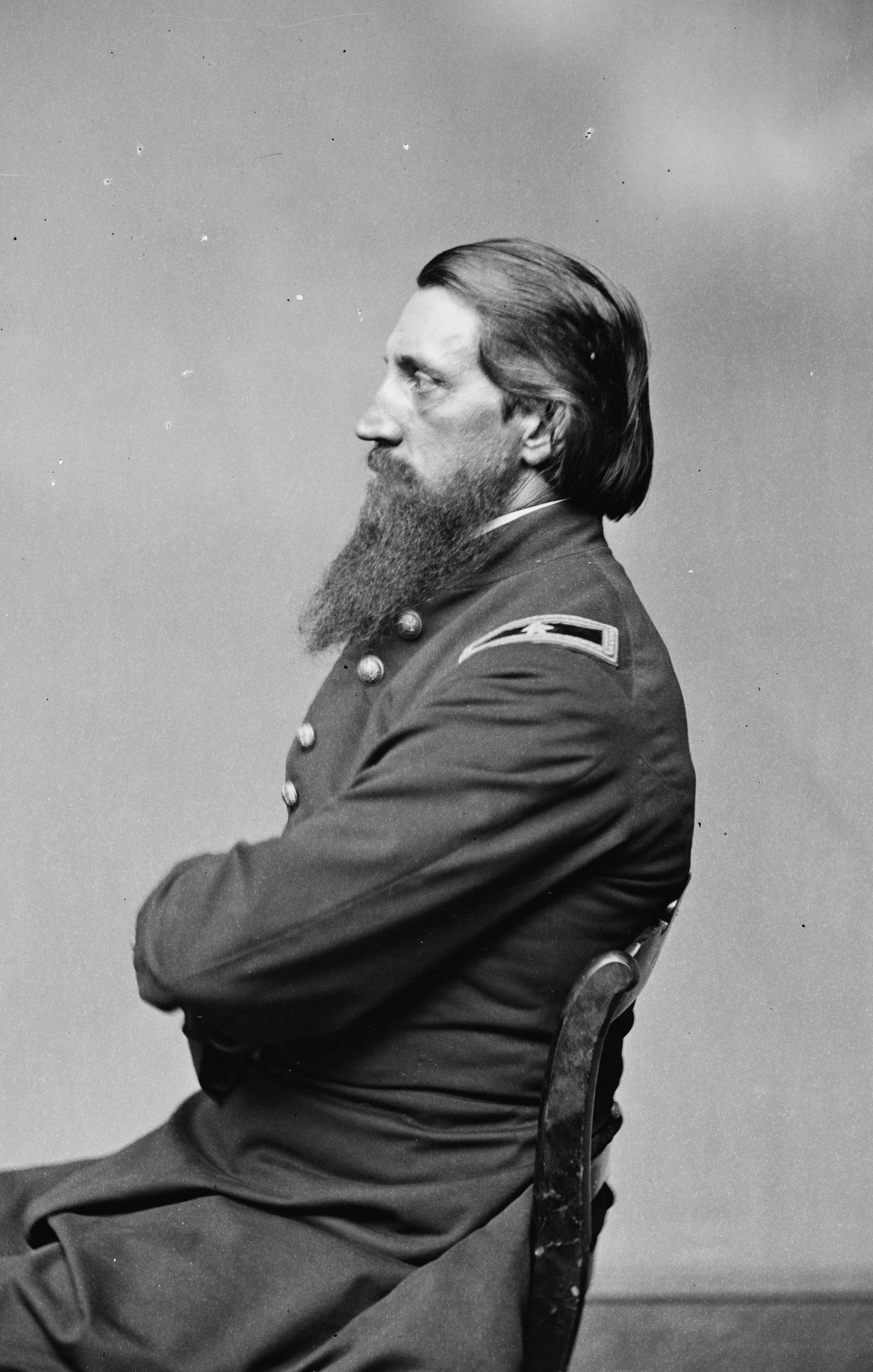
Brigadier General Alfred W. Ellet was commander of the Mississippi Marine Brigade

Brigadier General Alfred W. Ellet was the commanding officer of the United States Ram Fleet. The ram fleet had proven themselves a useful addition to the Mississippi River Squadron through their actions at the First Battle of Memphis and on the Yazoo River. However, the ram fleet was outside the Union Navy and Army command and reported directly to the Secretary of War, Edwin M. Stanton. Although they coordinated their activities with the Mississippi River Squadron led by Charles H. Davis, the reporting structure was problematic for Union Navy leaders. The brigade was never incorporated into the Union Navy, however, when David Dixon Porter took over command of the Mississippi River Squadron, he demanded and received full authority over the ram fleet. Porter needed an amphibious force to suppress enemy fire from the river shores that threatened his fleet.

On 1 November 1862, Ellet was charged with creating and commanding the Mississippi Marine Brigade. The unit consisted of artillery, cavalry and infantry with the ram fleet used for transportation. The brigade was not able to recruit from existing Army or Navy units and instead recruited convalescing soldiers from hospitals who wished to return to service. Ellet promised recruits bonuses, the opportunity to serve aboard clean vessels with good food and the potential for fame.

On 5 November, Ellet's nephew, Charles Rivers Ellet was promoted to the rank of colonel and became the third member of the Ellet family to lead the ram fleet. Ellet was only 19 years old, which made him one of the youngest colonels in the Union Army. Another nephew, John A. Ellet also served as Lieutenant Colonel in the brigade.

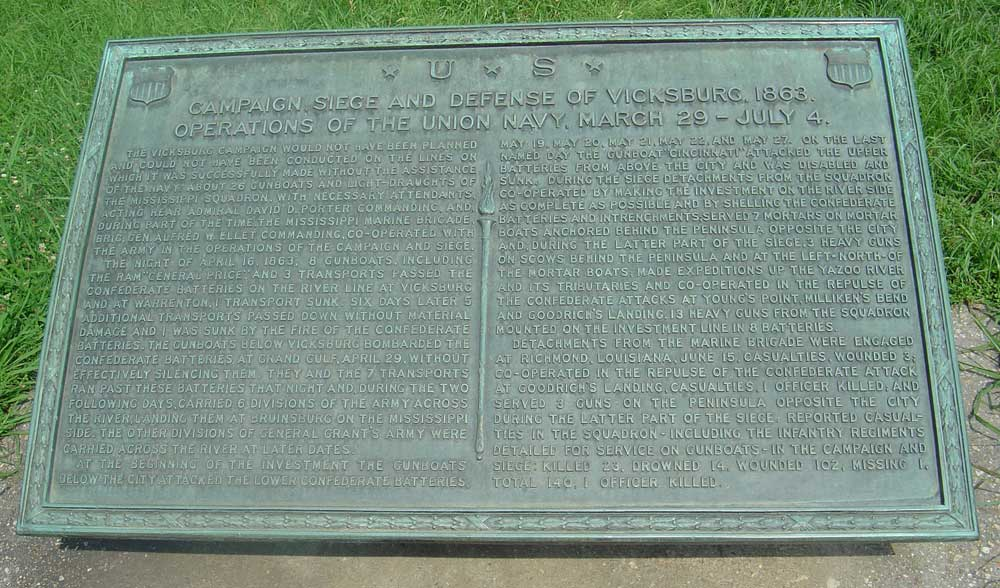
Union Navy Memorial at Vicksburg

The unit consisted of about 350 officers and men, including boat crews which used the nine steam powered rams of the United States Ram Fleet. Other vessels were added to the ram fleet including the tugs Alf Cutting, Bell Darlington and Cleveland; the hospital ship Woodford and the transports Autocrat, Baltic and Diana.

== Vicksburg Campaign ==
On 12 December 1862, the Queen of the West was one of the ships that accompanied the USS Cairo up the Yazoo River. The Cairo was struck by a 'torpedo' or naval mine and began to sink rapidly. The Queen of the West was able to rescue part of the crew from the Cairo before it sank.

In February 1863, the Queen of the West was run past the batteries of Vicksburg, Mississippi to support Admiral David Farragut south of the city. The Queen of the West severely damaged the CSS Vicksburg and captured four transport ships supplying Confederate forces. The Queen of the West also conducted activities on the Atchafalaya River, destroying Confederate supplies and burning three plantations. She was captured by Confederate forces on the Red River near Fort DeRussy and entered into Confederate service as the CSS Queen of the West.

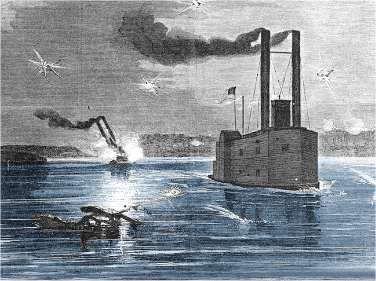
The USS Switzerland and USS Lancaster running past the batteries at Vicksburg

On 26 March, the ram ships Switzerland and USS Lancaster were run past the batteries at Vicksburg to support Admiral Farragut. Charles Rivers Ellet commanded the Switzerland and his cousin, John A. Ellet, commanded the Lancaster. Both ships received heavy fire from the batteries and the Lancaster was run aground and sunk to avoid capture by the Confederate forces. The Switzerland was damaged but was repaired and continued duty south of Vicksburg on the Mississippi River.

On 14 June, the unit joined Brigadier General Joseph A. Mower in the Battle of Richmond, Louisiana and skirmished with the Confederates, losing 3 wounded.

On 19 June, Brigadier General Ellett ordered construction of a casemate on the Louisiana side of the Mississippi River opposite Vicksburg. The fortification was completed in four days and was protected with a thickness of railroad iron. A 20-pounder Parrott rifle was placed within and fired on the city the morning of 23 June. The Confederates responded firing 17 rounds from 5 different guns. The fort was further strengthened by adding another thickness of railroad iron. Fire from the Parrott gun in the fort was maintained until the end of the siege with a total of 98 rounds being expended. The fort was repeatedly struck but without material damage and without loss of life. The brigade also placed a brass Dahlgren gun in the casemate near the 20-pounder Parrott. Considerable damage to the Confederates was accomplished especially by stopping work at the foundry and machine shop.

On 25–30 June, a detachment of the brigade on the steamer John Rains, formed a part of an expedition to Greenville, Mississippi under the command of Lt. Col. Samuel J. Nasmith of the 25th Wisconsin Infantry.

On 30 June, the brigade saw action at the Goodrich's Landing. Two African-American Union regiments, the 1st Arkansas and the 10th Louisiana had come under attack from Confederate forces. The brigade arrived and pushed back the Confederate forces, suffering two casualties and one death.

== Transfer to Army jurisdiction ==
A ruling of the Judge-Advocate General, dated 11 June 1863, seems to make the brigade a "special contingent of the army and not the navy," but as late as 23 July 1863, Maj. Gen. Ulysses S. Grant wrote: "They (the officers and men of the Marine Brigade) are not subject to my orders." By order of the Secretary of War the army assumed full jurisdiction over the brigade in October 1863. The brigade was disestablished in August 1864, and its surviving ships were transferred to other duties.

== Notable members ==
- Henry N. Couden - 54th Chaplain of the United States House of Representatives
- Brigadier General Alfred W. Ellet - commander of the Mississippi Marine Brigade
- Colonel Charles Rivers Ellet - commander of the United States Ram Fleet from November 1862 to August 1863
- Lieutenant Colonel John A. Ellet - commander of the United States Ram Fleet from August 1863 to 1864

== See also ==
- Charles Ellet, Jr.

== Sources ==
- Abbott, John S.C. (1866). Charles Ellet and His Naval Steam Rams. Harper's Magazine, Volume 32.
- Bearss, Edwin C. (1980). Hardluck Ironclad: The Sinking and Salvage of the Cairo. Baton Rouge: Louisiana State University Press. ISBN 978-0-8071-0684-6.
- Crandall, Warren Daniel (1907). History of the Ram Fleet and the Mississippi Marine Brigade in the War for the Union on the Mississippi and its tributaries: the story of the Ellets and their men. Press of the Buschart Brothers.
- Hearn, Chester G. (2000). Ellet's Brigade: The Strangest Outfit of All. LSU Press. ISBN 0-8071-2559-8.
- Joiner, Gary D. (2007). Mr. Lincoln's Brown Water Navy - The Mississippi Squadron. Rowman & Littlefield Publishers, Inc. ISBN 978-0-7425-5097-1.
- Tomblin, Barbara Brooks (2016). The Civil War on the Mississippi: Union Sailors, Gunboat Captains, and the Campaign to Control the River. University Press of Kentucky. ISBN 978-0-8131-6703-9.
