= USS Samson =

Tugboat of the United States Navy

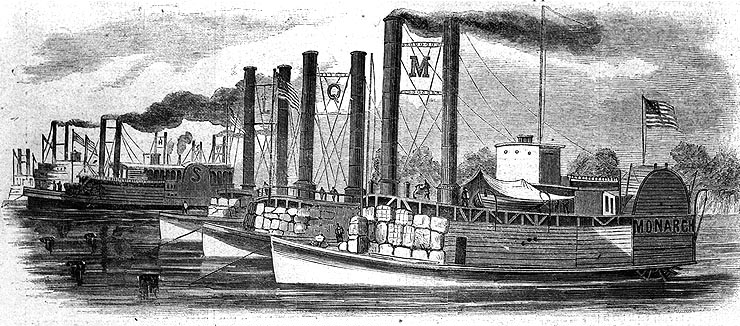
- Ships in the foreground are: Monarch (letter "M" between stacks), Queen of the West (with letter "Q"), and Lioness (letter "L"). In the left background are: Switzerland (with letter "S" on paddlebox), Samson and Lancaster are in the background.

History

United States
- Launched: 1860, at California, Pennsylvania
- In service: 1862
- Out of service: 1865
- Fate: sold, 9 August 1865

General characteristics
- Displacement: 230 tons
- Propulsion: steam engine; side wheel-propelled
- Armament: ram

USS Samson was a steamer acquired by the Union Army at the start of the American Civil War for usage in the United States Ram Fleet in the Mississippi River and its tributaries.

She was transferred to the Union Navy in 1862 who continued her service on the Mississippi River. She was used as a tugboat and as a ship’s tender which provided machine shop services to the ships in the fleet.

== Service history ==
Samson, a wooden side wheel steamer built in 1860 at California, Pennsylvania, was purchased by the Union Army on 14 July 186 by Charles Ellet, Jr. for service in his ram fleet. After the Western flotilla was placed under Navy command in the early autumn of 1862, Samson was transferred to the Union Navy on 27 November 1862. She served the Mississippi Squadron as a tugboat and a floating machine shop throughout the remainder of the Civil War. As such, she was one of the early predecessors of modern repair ships. After the end of hostilities, she was sold at public auction at Mound City, Illinois, to J. W. Clark and J. Nixon, et, al., on 9 August 1865. She was redocumented on 27 December 1865 and remained in merchant service until 1869.
