= CSS Vicksburg =

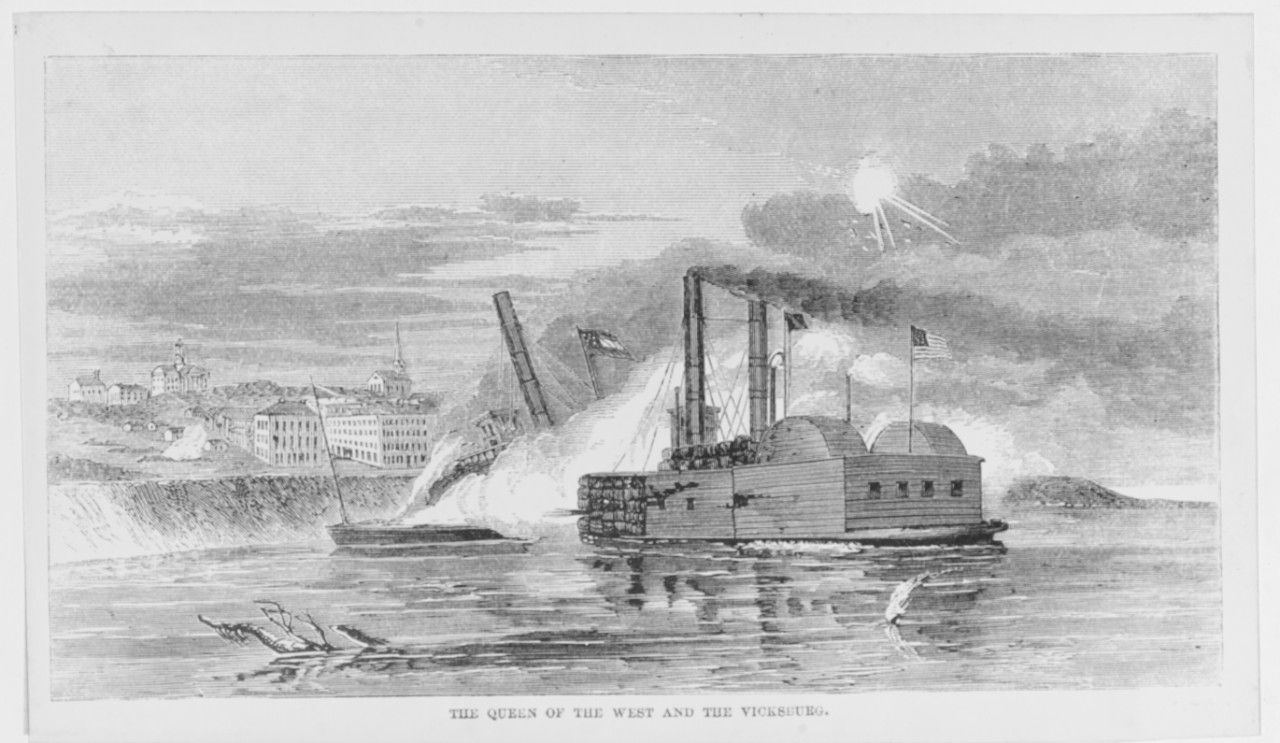
US Army Ram Queen of the West attacks CSS Vicksburg.

CSS Vicksburg, sometimes noted as City of Vicksburg, was built in 1857 at New Albany, Indiana, and owned and home ported in New Orleans. With the coming of the war she was evidently seized or bought for use on the river. A report of 19 February 1862 tells of her carrying guns up river to the forts above Memphis.

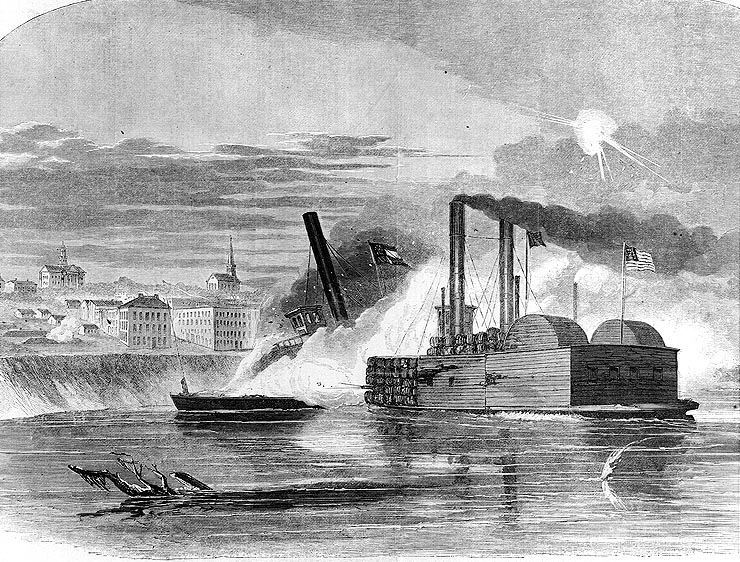
The federal gunboat Queen of the West rams CSS Vicksburg.

== History ==
At Natchez, Miss., in May 1862, five Union ships were before the city. They had sent in a flag of truce. At this time, Vicksburg came down river with troops for the defense of Natchez. Brig. General C. G. Dahlgren, CSA, was on shore at the time and fired a musket to warn her off. She put about and went up river, being chased by two shots from gunboat USS Oneida.

Vicksburg made good her escape. In July 1862 she was spotted on the Black River in company with a Confederate gunboat, probably carrying troops and supplies. Early next year, February 1863, she was "lying at the landing" of the city of Vicksburg. Admiral Porter ordered his ram Queen of the West to run the defenses of Vicksburg, and attack the steamer Vicksburg in passing down.

Under the daring and gallant Col. Charles R. Ellet, Queen of the West got underway, after delays, and early in the morning of 2 February 1863, came in sight of Vicksburg.

The Confederates opened a heavy fire on Queen of the West, which was partially turned to make a better angle to deflect projectiles. In so doing, way was lost and the current took charge. But, with guns shotted with incendiary projectiles, Ellet directed a fire on Vicksburg and rammed her.

"The Vicksburg," reported Ellet, "was the largest and strongest steamer on this river, and I think they were preparing to use her against our transports, being very fleet." Deserters reported a large hole knocked in the side of Vicksburg. She was discovered to be on fire, and only held afloat by being buoyed up with coal barges.

Machinery removed, Vicksburg remained at Vicksburg as a wharf boat. On 29 March 1863, Federal units were sent to quarters, just after midnight. A steamer had been reported coming down river. The weather was squally, and Vicksburg had gone adrift. She passed by, "a harmless hulk," but was totally burned by three men who were seen chasing after her along the shore.

Vicksburg didn't die easily. The Federals sent a party to inspect the "totally consumed" hulk and found no machinery aboard. But, in December 1863, a report to Secretary of War E. M. Stanton gave intelligence of a "very formidable vessel" being finished near Mobile. Said the report: "This vessel is said to contain the machinery of the steamer Vicksburg, which was taken overland from Vicksburg to Mobile. These engines were constructed partially under my superintendence at New Albany, when the steamer Vicksburg was constructed, and I know the engine to be as powerful as any now on the Mississippi River."
