= USS Ellet =

Benham-class destroyer

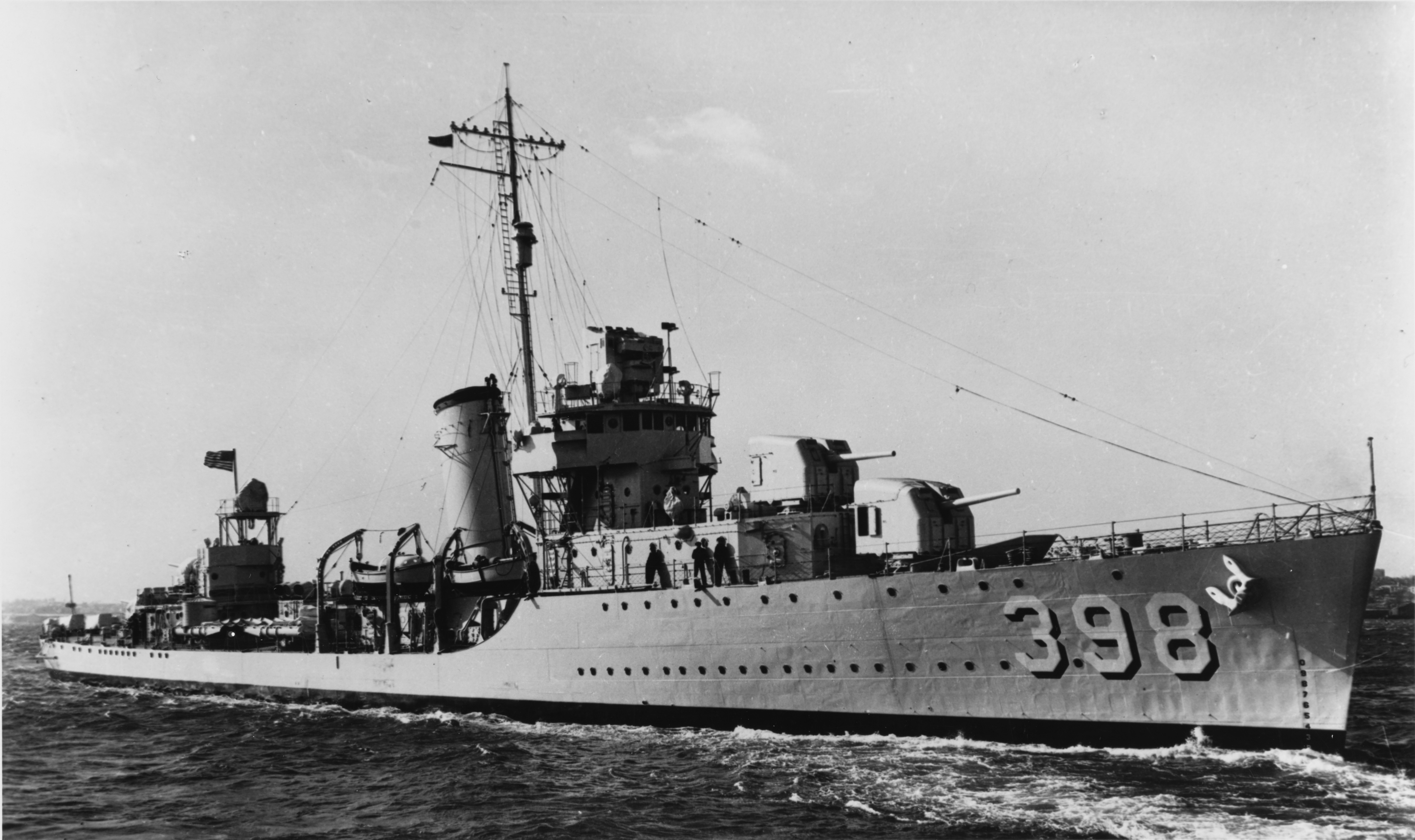
- USS Ellet (DD-398)

History

United States
- Namesake: Five members of the Ellet family
- Builder: Federal Shipbuilding and Dry Dock Company
- Laid down: 3 December 1936
- Launched: 11 June 1938
- Commissioned: 17 February 1939
- Decommissioned: 29 October 1945
- Honours and awards: 10 × battle stars
- Fate: Sold 1 August 1947

General characteristics
- Class & type: Benham-class destroyer
- Displacement: 1,850 tons
- Length: 341 ft 3 in
- Beam: 35 ft 6 in
- Draft: 10 ft 9 in
- Speed: 38 kt
- Complement: 184 officers and enlisted
- Armament: 4 × 5 in (130 mm)/38 guns, 16 21" torpedo tubes

USS Ellet (DD-398) was a Benham-class destroyer in the United States Navy during World War II. She was named for five members of the Ellet family of Pennsylvania who rendered service during the American Civil War: Colonel Charles Ellet, Jr.; Brigadier General Alfred W. Ellet; Colonel Charles R. Ellet; Lieutenant Colonel John A. Ellet; and Edward C. Ellet. The first two officers commanded the United States Ram Fleet.

== History ==
Ellet (DD-398) was launched 11 June 1938 by Federal Shipbuilding and Dry Dock Company, Kearny, New Jersey; sponsored by Miss Elvira Daniel Cabell, granddaughter of Colonel Charles Ellet, Jr.; and commissioned 17 February 1939.

In September and October 1939 Ellet operated off the Grand Banks on Neutrality Patrol, then with Destroyer Division 18 out of Galveston with the West Gulf Patrol. Based at San Diego, after 26 February 1940, she joined in Battle Force maneuvers as far as Hawaii. In the summer of 1941 her home port became Pearl Harbor and in October she brought home an Army survey expedition from Christmas Island to Honolulu.

When the Japanese attacked Pearl Harbor 7 December 1941, Ellet was returning from reinforcing Wake Island in the screen of TF 8 with which she remained throughout December. After a convoy escort voyage to the west coast, she guarded a troop convoy back to Christmas Island in February.

In April she screened Carrier TF 16, which launched B-25's in the famous Halsey-Doolittle Raid on Tokyo and other Japanese cities and returned to Pearl Harbor the 25th. The same ships raced 5 days later to reinforce the carriers headed for the Battle of the Coral Sea. It was won before Ellet's force got there, so TF 16 returned to Pearl Harbor. TF 16 sailed from Pearl Harbor 28 May 1942 once more to join Task Force 17 (TF 17). Together they turned back the Japanese fleet in the Battle of Midway on 4, 5 and 6 June. The Japanese lost four carriers, many aircraft, and a number of irreplaceable aviators. Ellet returned to Pearl Harbor on 13 June to prepare for invading the Solomons, the first American land offensive of the war.

Ellet arrived off Guadalcanal 7 August 1942 for pre-invasion bombardment, patrolled the transport area, and fought off air attacks. On 9 August she rescued 41 officers and 451 men from Quincy (CA-39) and 1 man from Astoria (CA-34), sunk in the Battle of Savo Island the night before, then joined Selfridge (DD-357) in the duty of sinking the hulk of HMAS Canberra, hopelessly battered in the same battle. While escorting transports deadheading back to Nouméa, Ellet was detached 12 August to screen the Enterprise (CV-6) task force covering reinforcement and supply of the Solomons. She got back to Pearl Harbor 10 September.

Out of Espiritu Santo Ellet patrolled to the Solomons with TF 16 from November 1942 until May 1943, then returned to Pearl Harbor. Back at Espiritu Santo 1 July, she hurried to Tulagi for the consolidation of the northern Solomons. She sailed for overhaul on the west coast in September 1943.

By the end of January 1944, Ellet was back in action, screening carriers about to invade the Marshalls. After a week in Pearl Harbor for repairs, she saw action in New Guinea, supporting the operations at Hollandia in April. Upon her return to Pearl Harbor she joined the 5th Fleet for the invasion of the Marianas, screening diversionary raids on the Bonins, and carriers in the assaults on Saipan and Guam.

Ellet arrived at Ulithi Atoll 13 October 1944 and was sent to scout neighboring Ngulu Atoll for a proposed secondary fleet anchorage. Troops landed at Ngulu 16 October. When Montgomery (DM-17) struck a mine the 17th, Ellet came to the rescue with pumps then towed her in to Ulithi lagoon.

At October's end, Ellet joined the Marianas Patrol and Escort Group. She bombarded Iwo Jima, in December 1944 and the following January. Based on Guam and Saipan, she escorted convoys and patrolled on air-sea rescue station until July 1945.

When hostilities ended, Ellet was repairing at Mare Island. She was decommissioned there 29 October 1945, and sold 1 August 1947.

== Honors ==
Ellet received 10 battle stars for World War II service.
