= USS Queen of the West =

Sidewheel steamer ram ship

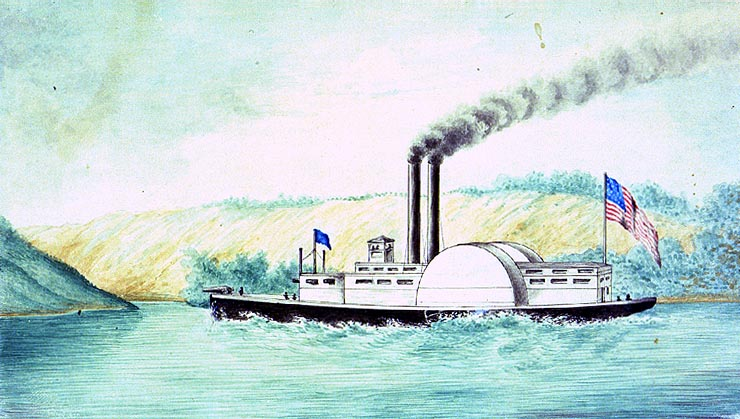
- USS Queen of the West

History

United States
- Name: USS Queen of the West
- Launched: 1854
- Commissioned: 1862
- Fate: Captured by Confederate States Army, February 14, 1863

Confederate States
- Name: CSS Queen of the West
- Commissioned: February 1863
- Fate: Attacked and destroyed, April 11, 1863

General characteristics
- Type: Sidewheel steamer
- Displacement: 406 tons
- Length: 180 ft (55 m)
- Beam: 37 ft 6 in (11.43 m)
- Propulsion: Steam engine
- Complement: 120 officers and men
- Armament: 1 × 30-pounder cannon; 3 × 12-pounder howitzers

The USS Queen of the West was a sidewheel steamer ram ship and the flagship of the United States Ram Fleet and the Mississippi Marine Brigade. It was built at Cincinnati, Ohio, in 1854. It served as a commercial steamer until purchased by Colonel Charles Ellet Jr. in 1862 and converted for use as a ram ship. The ship operated in conjunction with the Mississippi River Squadron during the Union brown-water navy battle against the Confederate River Defense Fleet for control of the Mississippi River and its tributaries during the American Civil War.

The ship played a critical role in the Union Navy victory at the First Battle of Memphis and sank the Confederate vessel CSS Colonel Lovell. In actions south of Vicksburg, Mississippi, she severely damaged the CSS City of Vicksburg and captured four transport ships supplying Confederate forces.

On February 14, 1863, the USS Queen of the West was captured by Confederate forces on the Red River, repaired and returned to service as the CSS Queen of the West. Together with the CSS Webb, it was used to force the surrender of the USS Indianola on the Mississippi River.

On April 11, 1863, she was attacked and destroyed on the Atchafalaya River by the USS Estrella, USS Calhoun and USS Arizona.

== Service as USS Queen of the West ==
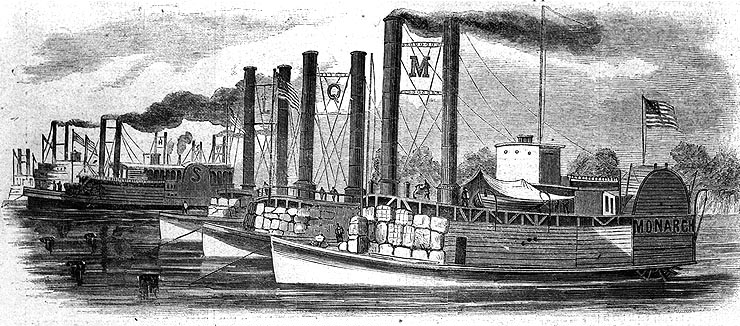
An engraving from Harper's Weekly depicting several of the United States Ram Fleet ships. The Queen of the West is second from the front with the large "Q" between the smoke stacks

The Queen of the West was built in Cincinnati, Ohio in 1854 and served as a commercial steamer. She was purchased by Charles Ellet Jr. in 1862 due to her speed and converted for usage as a ram ship. The hull was reinforced, the forward end filled with hard oak wood, the steam-engine secured and the pilot house protected by thick wooden planks. Three longitudinal bulkheads were added and supported with iron bars. A central beam was installed from bow to stern and iron peaks were installed on the bow. A large ornamental "Q" was installed in the support cables between the twin chimney stacks. She was originally not equipped with any guns. The Queen of the West was designated as Colonel Ellet's flagship of the United States Ram Fleet.

On May 25, the Queen of the West and the ram fleet joined the Mississippi River Squadron, led by Charles H. Davis, on the Mississippi River north of Fort Pillow. Davis had little faith in the effectiveness of the rams but allowed the fleet to accompany his gunboats down the river to Memphis.

=== First Battle of Memphis ===
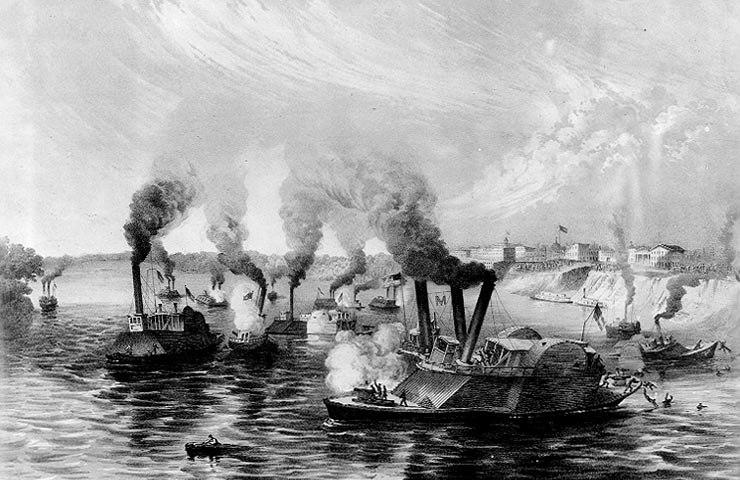
The Queen of the West sank the Confederate flagship CSS Colonel Lovell at the First Battle of Memphis

On June 6, Colonel Charles Ellet Jr. led the ram ships in the First Battle of Memphis as captain of the Queen of the West. Ellet had not coordinated a plan of attack with Davis and when the flotilla approached Confederate forces, the Queen of the West and the USS Monarch steamed ahead of Davis' gunboats. The Queen of the West rammed and sank the Confederate vessel CSS Colonel Lovell. After the collision, the Queen of the West came under attack from the CSS Sumter and the CSS Beauregard. The attack sheared off one of the paddle wheels from the Queen of the West and forced her to ground on the riverbank. Ellet was wounded in the knee by a Confederate sharpshooter during the battle. His wound was the only serious casualty received on the Union side during the battle. Ellet died 15 days from a blood infection due to the injury. Ellet's brother, Alfred W. Ellet took command of the ram fleet and his son Charles Rivers Ellet became captain of the Queen of the West.

=== Actions near Vicksburg ===
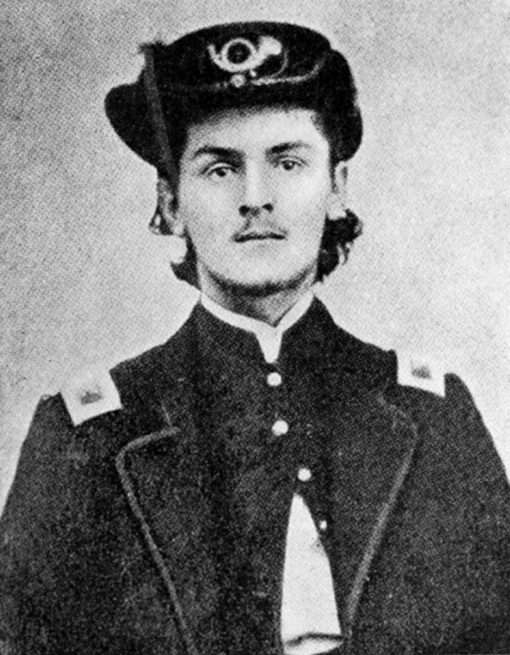
Charles R. Ellet commanded the Queen of the West in daring actions on the Yazoo River and on the Mississippi River south of Vicksburg

On July 15, the Queen of the West, USS Carondelet, and USS Tyler engaged the Confederate ironclad ram CSS Arkansas in the Yazoo River. The Arkansas was heavily damaged but escaped into the Mississippi and took refuge under the Confederate batteries at Vicksburg, Mississippi. On July 22, Queen of the West and USS Essex attacked Arkansas, despite the batteries at Vicksburg. The Queen of the West rammed the Arkansas but inflicted only minor damage and rejoined the Mississippi River Squadron ships above Vicksburg.

The Queen of the West continued to support operations against Vicksburg. On September 19, while escorting two transport barges, the Queen of the West had a short engagement with Confederate infantry and artillery on the Mississippi River above Bolivar, Mississippi. The Queen of the West also conducted operations in the Yazoo River clearing mines and engaging Confederate batteries.

In November 1862, the Mississippi Marine Brigade, an amphibious raiding unit, was organized by Alfred W. Ellet. The ram fleet including the Queen of the West was incorporated as a part of the brigade. On November 5, Charles Rivers Ellet was promoted to the rank of colonel and assigned command of the ram fleet.

On December 12, 1862, the Queen of the West was one of the ships that accompanied the USS Cairo up the Yazoo River. The Cairo was struck by a 'torpedo' or naval mine and began to sink rapidly. The Queen of the West was able to rescue part of the crew from the Cairo before it sank.

On February 2, 1863, Charles Rivers Ellet was ordered by Admiral David Dixon Porter to run the Queen of the West past the batteries at Vicksburg, Mississippi to support Admiral David Farragut below the city. The boat was equipped with a 30-pounder bow gun, three 12-pounder howitzers, cotton bales and wooden sheathing for protection. Ellet intended to "run the gauntlet" of Vicksburg by cover of night, however delays resulted in passage of the guns at daybreak. The guns at Vicksburg fired for 50 minutes straight. The Queen of the West took 12 hits and lost a gun but made it past the batteries with minimal damage. The run provided the Union forces with insight as to where the guns at Vicksburg were positioned.

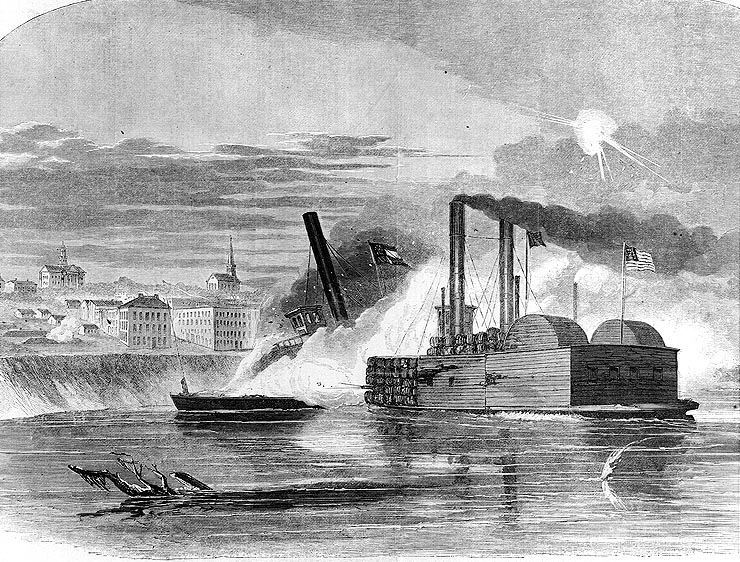
The Queen of the West rammed the CSS City of Vicksburg and set her ablaze with turpentine soaked balls fired from the forward gun

Once past the batteries, the Queen of the West found the City of Vicksburg docked, rammed her, and set her ablaze with turpentine-soaked balls fired from the forward gun. The City of Vicksburg was severely damaged but not destroyed. The Queen of the West had to disengage before destroying the City of Vicksburg due to enemy fire which set the cotton bales aboard the Queen of the West ablaze.

The Union forces supplied the Queen of the West with fuel by floating an unmanned coal barge filled with 20,000 bushels of coal past the Vicksburg batteries at night. The barge went unnoticed by the Confederate forces and floated downriver 10 miles before being intercepted by the Queen of the West. The barge provided the Queen of the West with enough fuel to continue her mission.

On February 3, the Queen of the West captured three Confederate transport ships - the CSS A.W. Baker, CSS Moro and CSS Berwick Bay. The Moro was empty of cargo since it had just dropped off supplies at Port Hudson, Louisiana. The other two ships were laden with food supplies headed toward Vicksburg.

The Queen of the West rendezvoused with the De Soto and on February 12, both ships went down the Atchafalaya River to Simmesport, Louisiana in search of Confederate forces. The crew went ashore, destroyed all supplies found and looted the residential area. On the way back up the Mississippi River, the Queen of the West received Confederate gun fire and the 1st mate was injured. In retaliation, Ellet and his crew burned three plantations that were believed to be the residences of those that injured the 1st mate.

=== Loss of the Queen of the West ===
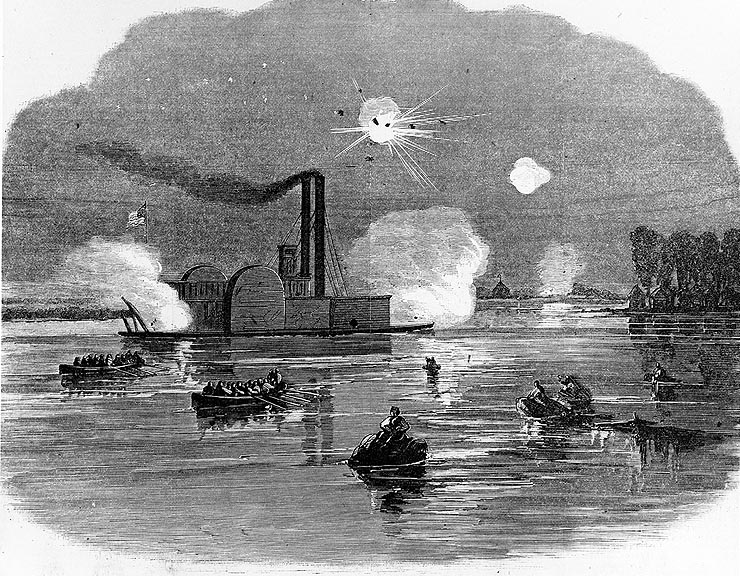
The Queen of the West was captured by Confederate forces on the Red River near Fort DeRussy

On February 14, the Queen of the West and De Soto went up the Red River and captured the steamboat Era No. 5 carrying 4,500 bushels of corn. The Queen of the West continued upstream to investigate reports of steamships at Gordon's Landing near Marksville, Louisiana. She came under heavy fire by the shore batteries of Fort DeRussy and was run aground onto the right bank by her pilot instead of backing down river as ordered. She was directly in the sight of Confederate guns, which pounded her until Ellet ordered "abandon ship". Ellet and the crew escaped and floated downstream on bales of cotton and were rescued by the De Soto. The Queen of the West was not burned out of concern for the 1st mate, who was wounded and could not be moved. The USS Queen of the West was captured, repaired and re-entered into service as the CSS Queen of the West by the Confederate forces.

== Service as CSS Queen of the West ==
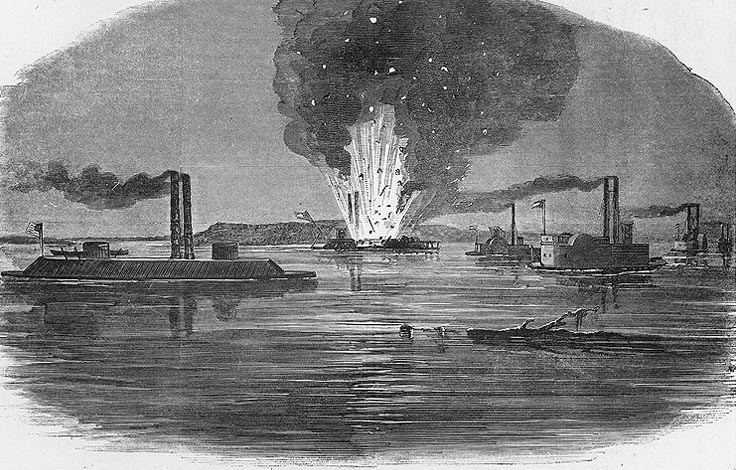
The CSS Queen of the West and the CSS Webb forced the surrender of the USS Indianola

In conjunction with the Confederate ram, CSS Webb, she forced the surrender of USS Indianola in the Mississippi River below Vicksburg on February 24. On April 11, 1863, she was attacked on the Atchafalaya River in Louisiana by Union ships USS Estrella, Calhoun, and Arizona. A shell from Calhoun set fire to Queen of the West's cotton, and her burning wreck drifted down the river for several hours before she grounded and exploded. 90 members of the Confederate crew were captured and 26 killed.

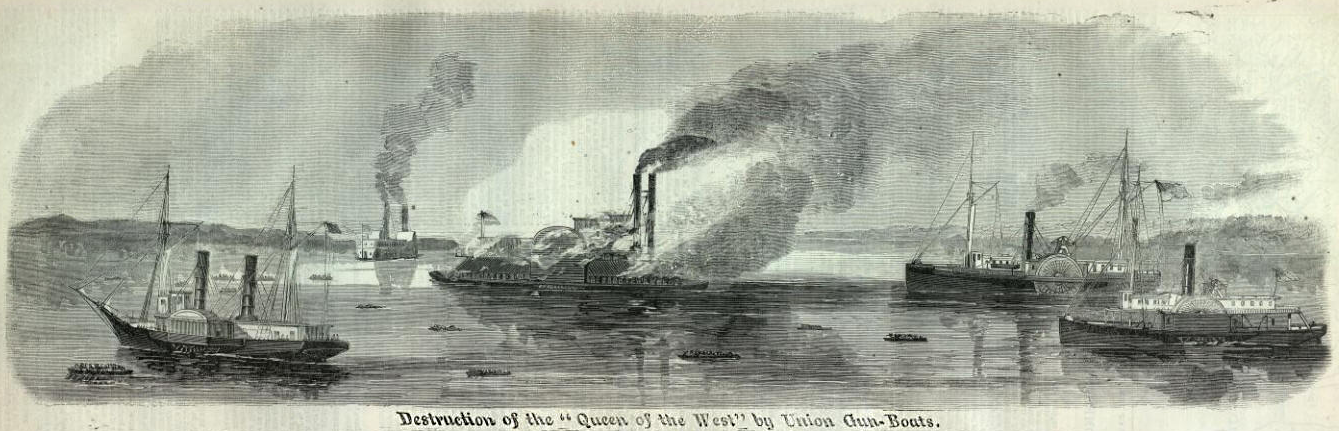
The CSS Queen of the West was destroyed on the Atchafalaya River by the USS Estrella, USS Calhoun and USS Arizona

== See also ==
- Anaconda Plan
- Union Navy

== Sources ==
- Abbott, John S.C. (1866). Charles Ellet and His Naval Steam Rams. Harper's Magazine, Volume 32.
- Bearss, Edwin C. (1980). Hardluck Ironclad: The Sinking and Salvage of the Cairo. Baton Rouge: Louisiana State University Press. ISBN 978-0-8071-0684-6.
- Crandall, Warren Daniel (1907). History of the Ram Fleet and the Mississippi Marine Brigade in the War for the Union on the Mississippi and its tributaries: the story of the Ellets and their men. Press of the Buschart Brothers.
- Fowler, William M. (1990). Under Two Flags: The American Navy in the Civil War. Naval Institute Press. ISBN 978-1-61251-196-2.
- Hearn, Chester G. (2000). Ellet's Brigade: The Strangest Outfit of All. LSU Press. ISBN 0-8071-2559-8.
- Joiner, Gary D. (2007). Mr. Lincoln's Brown Water Navy - The Mississippi Squadron. Rowman & Littlefield Publishers, Inc. ISBN 978-0-7425-5097-1.
- Tomblin, Barbara Brooks (2016). The Civil War on the Mississippi: Union Sailors, Gunboat Captains, and the Campaign to Control the River. University Press of Kentucky. ISBN 978-0-8131-6703-9.
