= Era No. 5 =

History

Confederate States
- Launched: 1860
- Chartered: 1863

United States
- Captured: 14 February 1863

General characteristics
- Displacement: 115 long tons (117 t)
- Propulsion: Stern wheel steamer

Era No. 5 — a shallow-draft steamer built in 1860 at Pittsburgh, Pennsylvania — was chartered by the Confederates early in 1863 to transport corn from the Red River to Camden, Arkansas.

As the steamer — laden with 4,500 bushels of corn — proceeded to her destination on 14 February 1863, she rounded a sharp bend 15 mi (24 km) above the mouth of the Black River, came upon and was captured by the USS Queen of the West. After Queen of the West was lost the same day, her crew fled to Union positions in the Era No.5. Era No. 5 was then assigned to Colonel Charles R. Ellet's river fleet, fitted out with protective cotton baling and used by the Union as a dispatch boat and transport in the Mississippi River.
