= United States Ram Fleet =

Union Army ram ship unit

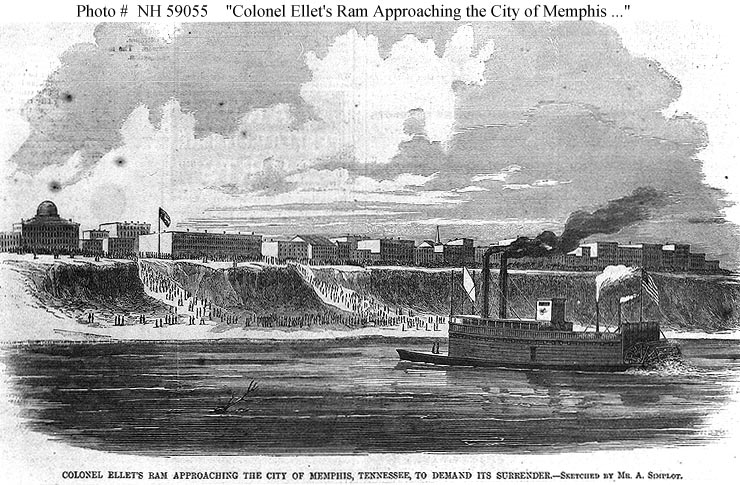
- United States Ram Fleet Approaching the City of Memphis, Tennessee to Demand Its Surrender
- Active: 1862–1864
- Country: United States
- Branch: United States Army

Commanders
- Notable commanders: Col. Charles Ellet Jr. Col. Alfred W. Ellet; Col. Charles R. Ellet; Lt. Col. John A. Ellet

The United States Ram Fleet was a Union army unit of steam powered ram ships during the American Civil War. The unit was independent of the Union army and Navy and reported directly to the Secretary of War, Edwin M. Stanton. The ram fleet operated in coordination with the Mississippi River Squadron during the Union brown-water navy campaign against the Confederate River Defense Fleet for control of the Mississippi River and its tributaries.

The unit was created and led by Colonel Charles Ellet Jr. until his death due to a wound received during the First Battle of Memphis. Command of the unit went to Charles Ellet Jr.'s brother, Alfred W. Ellet. The unit became part of the Mississippi Marine Brigade led by Alfred W. Ellet and command of the Ram Fleet was given to his nephew Charles Rivers Ellet and then to his nephew John A. Ellet. The unit was subsequently transferred to Union army command and disbanded in 1864.

== Formation ==
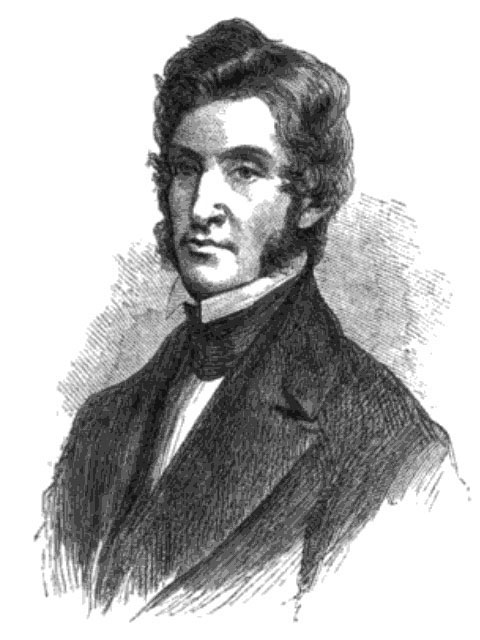
Charles Ellet Jr. created and led the U.S. Ram Fleet until his death due to a wound received at the First Battle of Memphis

Charles Ellet Jr. was a well-known civil engineer who built the first ever suspension bridge in the United States across the Schuylkill River in Philadelphia and the Wheeling Suspension Bridge, the longest suspension bridge in the world at the time, across the Ohio River at Wheeling, West Virginia.

When the Civil War broke out, Ellet advocated for the development of steam powered naval rams especially in light of the Confederate build up of ram ships. The Confederate forces captured the USS Merrimack at the Norfolk Navy Yard and converted her to a ram ship. Despite being bulky and slow-moving, the Union forces became convinced of the possibility of ram ships when the CSS Virginia sank the USS Cumberland and USS Congress at Hampton Roads.

In March 1862, Secretary of War Edwin M. Stanton appointed Ellet colonel of engineers and authorized him to form the United States Ram Fleet on the Mississippi River. The Union Navy's Mississippi River Squadron and the Confederate River Defense Fleet were battling for control of the Mississippi and Stanton was convinced by Ellet that the Union Navy efforts would benefit from the addition of ram ships. Ellet and the ram fleet were outside of Union Army or Navy command and reported directly to Stanton.

Ellet purchased the nine fastest river steamboats available on the Ohio River and converted them to rams. Their hulls were reinforced, the forward ends filled with hard oak wood, the steam-engines secured and the pilot houses protected by thick wooden planks. Three longitudinal bulkheads were added and supported with iron bars. Central beams were installed from bow to stern and iron peaks were installed on the bows. They were originally not equipped with any guns.

Ellet assigned family members as captains of the other rams, including his brother Alfred W. Ellet, his nephew John A. Ellet, and his son Charles Rivers Ellet.

On May 25, the Queen of the West and the ram fleet joined the Mississippi River Squadron, led by Charles H. Davis, on the Mississippi River north of Fort Pillow. Davis had little faith in the effectiveness of the rams but allowed the fleet to accompany his gunboats down the river to Memphis.

== First Battle of Memphis ==
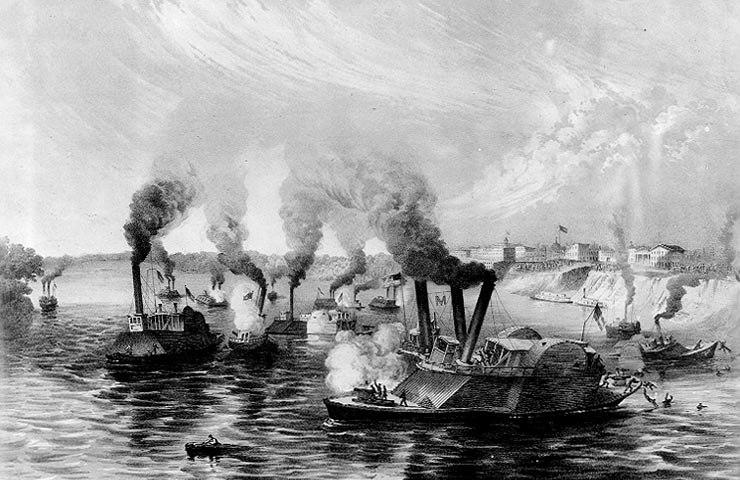
The ram fleet played a critical role in the Union Navy victory at the First Battle of Memphis

On June 6, Charles Ellet Jr. led four ram ships in the First Battle of Memphis; the USS Queen of the West, the USS Monarch, the USS Switzerland and the USS Lancaster. Ellet had not coordinated a plan of attack with Davis and when the flotilla approached Confederate forces, the Queen of the West and the Monarch steamed ahead of Davis' gunboats. The Queen of the West rammed and sank the Confederate flagship CSS Colonel Lovell. After the collision, the Queen of the West came under attack from the CSS Sumter and the CSS Beauregard. The attack sheared off one of the paddle wheels from the Queen of the West and forced her to ground on the riverbank. The Monarch rammed and sank the Beauregard and drove the CSS Little Rebel aground and captured her. The Confederate forces suffered a severe loss at the Battle of Memphis with heavy casualties and the loss of seven of their eight ships.

Ellet was wounded in the knee by a Confederate sharpshooter during the battle. His wound was the only serious casualty received on the Union side during the battle. Ellet refused to have his leg amputated and died 15 days from a blood infection due to the injury. Ellet's brother, Alfred W. Ellet took command of the ram fleet.

== Actions near Vicksburg ==
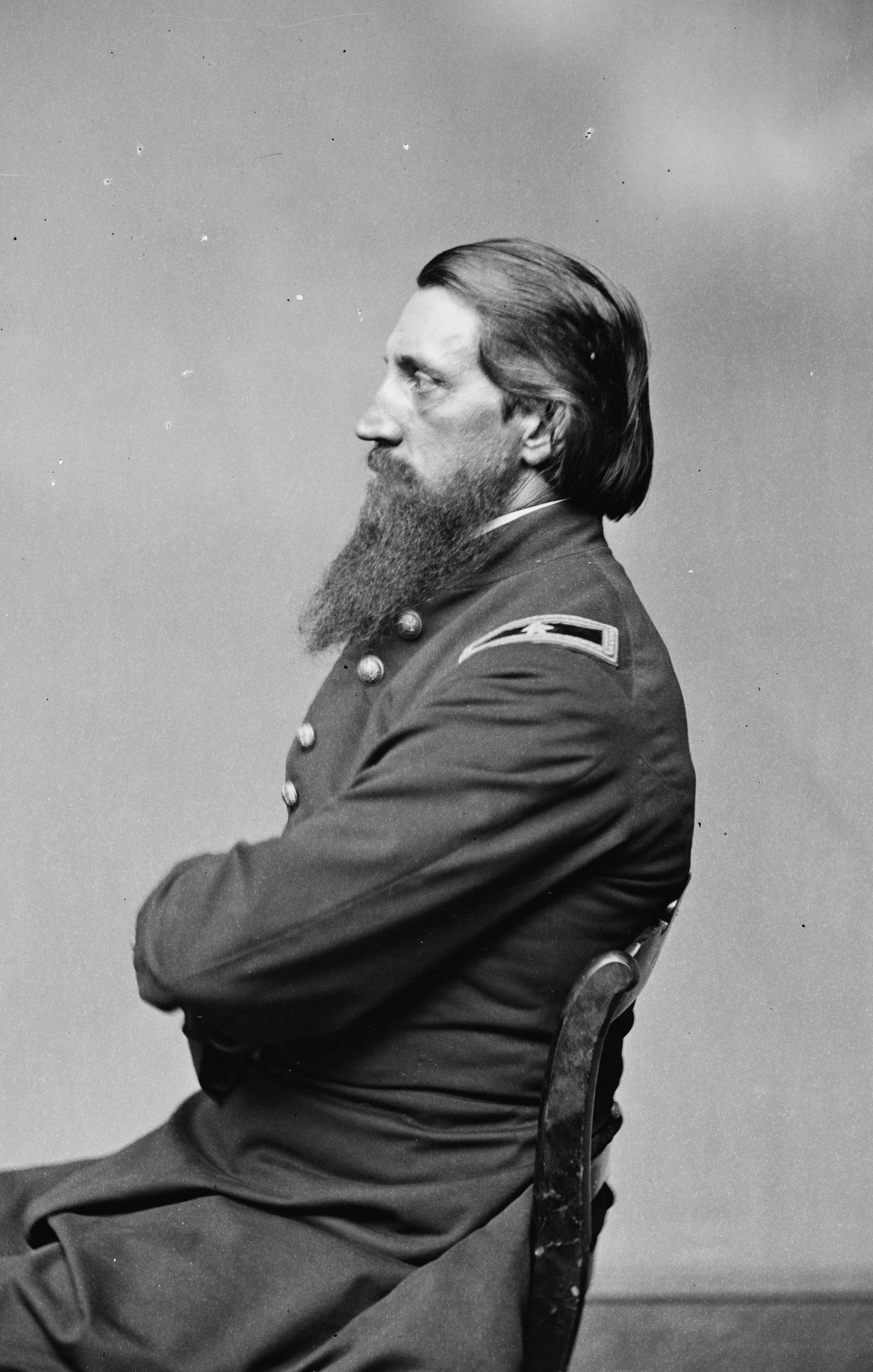
Brigadier General Alfred W. Ellet took over command of the United States Ram Fleet after the death of his brother, Charles Ellet Jr.

The ram fleet was never incorporated in the Union Navy, however, in the summer of 1862, when David Dixon Porter took over command of the Mississippi River Squadron, he demanded and received full authority over the ram fleet.

On June 26, Alfred W. Ellet commanded the Monarch and Charles Rivers Ellet commanded the Lancaster during action on the Yazoo River near Liverpool, Mississippi to capture or destroy three Confederate gunboats. The Confederates burned their ships; the CSS General Van Dorn, CSS General Polk and CSS Livingston, when they saw the Union forces approaching.

On July 15, the Queen of the West, USS Carondelet, and USS Tyler engaged the Confederate ironclad ram CSS Arkansas in the Yazoo River. The Arkansas was heavily damaged but escaped into the Mississippi River and took refuge under the Confederate batteries at Vicksburg, Mississippi. On July 22, Queen of the West and USS Essex attacked Arkansas, despite the batteries at Vicksburg. The Queen of the West rammed the Arkansas but inflicted only minor damage and rejoined the Mississippi River Squadron ships above Vicksburg. The ram fleet ships also conducted activities in the Yazoo River clearing mines and engaging Confederate batteries.

== Mississippi Marine Brigade ==
In November 1862, the Mississippi Marine Brigade, an amphibious raiding unit, was organized by Alfred W. Ellet and the ram fleet was incorporated as a part of the brigade. On November 5, Charles Rivers Ellet was promoted to the rank of colonel and became the third member of the Ellet family to lead the ram fleet. Ellet was only 19 years old which made him one of the youngest colonels in the Union Army. Under the two Ellet's leadership, the rams figured prominently in actions around and below Vicksburg, Mississippi, into 1863. In January 1863, the ram fleet ships participated in the Battle of Arkansas Post.

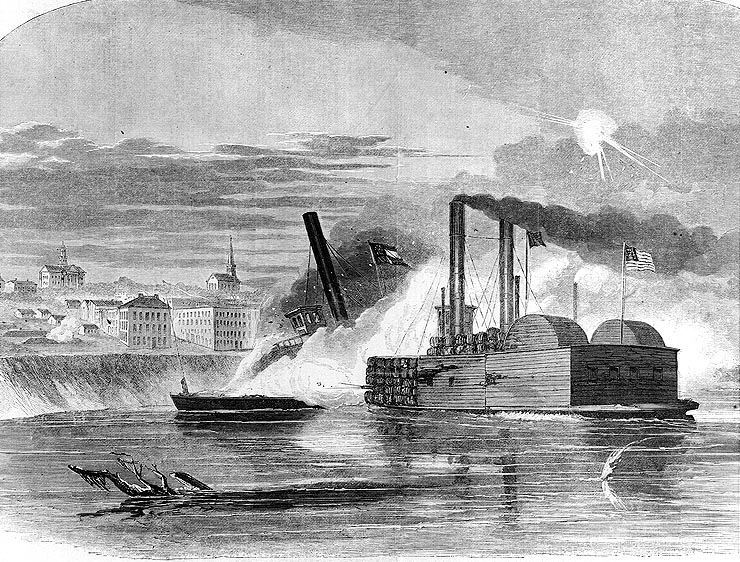
USS Queen of the West ramming the CSS City of Vicksburg

In February 1863, the Queen of the West was run past the batteries of Vicksburg to support Admiral David Farragut south of the city. The Queen of the West severely damaged the CSS Vicksburg and captured four transport ships supplying Confederate forces. The Queen of the West also conducted activities on the Atchafalaya River, destroying Confederate supplies and burning three plantations. She was captured by Confederate forces on the Red River near Fort DeRussy and entered into Confederate service as the CSS Queen of the West. The Mississippi Marine Brigade also saw action at the Battle of Richmond, Louisiana and the Battle of Goodrich's Landing.

Due to poor health, Charles Rivers Ellet tendered his resignation on August 14, 1863, and command of the ram fleet went to his cousin John A. Ellet. In August 1863, the Mississippi Marine Brigade was placed under command of General Ulysses Grant. The ram fleet was disestablished in August 1864, and its surviving ships were transferred to other duties.

== Ships ==
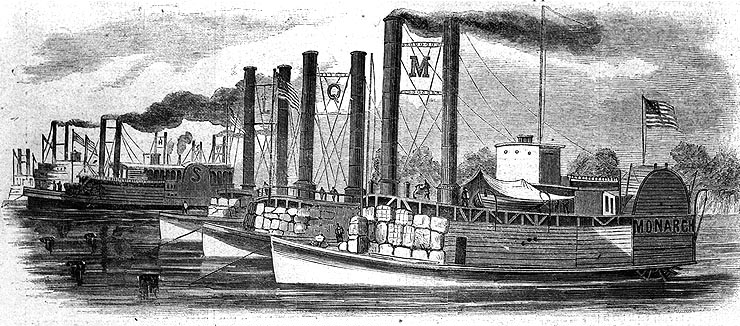
Line engraving published in Harper's Weekly, 1862, illustrating members of the fleet. Ships in the foreground are: Monarch (letter "M" between stacks), Queen of the West (with letter "Q") and Lioness (letter "L"). In the left background are: Switzerland (with letter "S" on paddle box), Samson and Lancaster.

The United States Ram Fleet included the following ships:

- USS Dick Fulton
- USS Lancaster
- USS Lioness
- USS Mingo
- USS Monarch
- USS Queen of the West - flagship
- USS Samson
- USS Switzerland
- USS T. D. Horner

== See also ==
- Anaconda Plan
