= Alfred W. Ellet =

American soldier

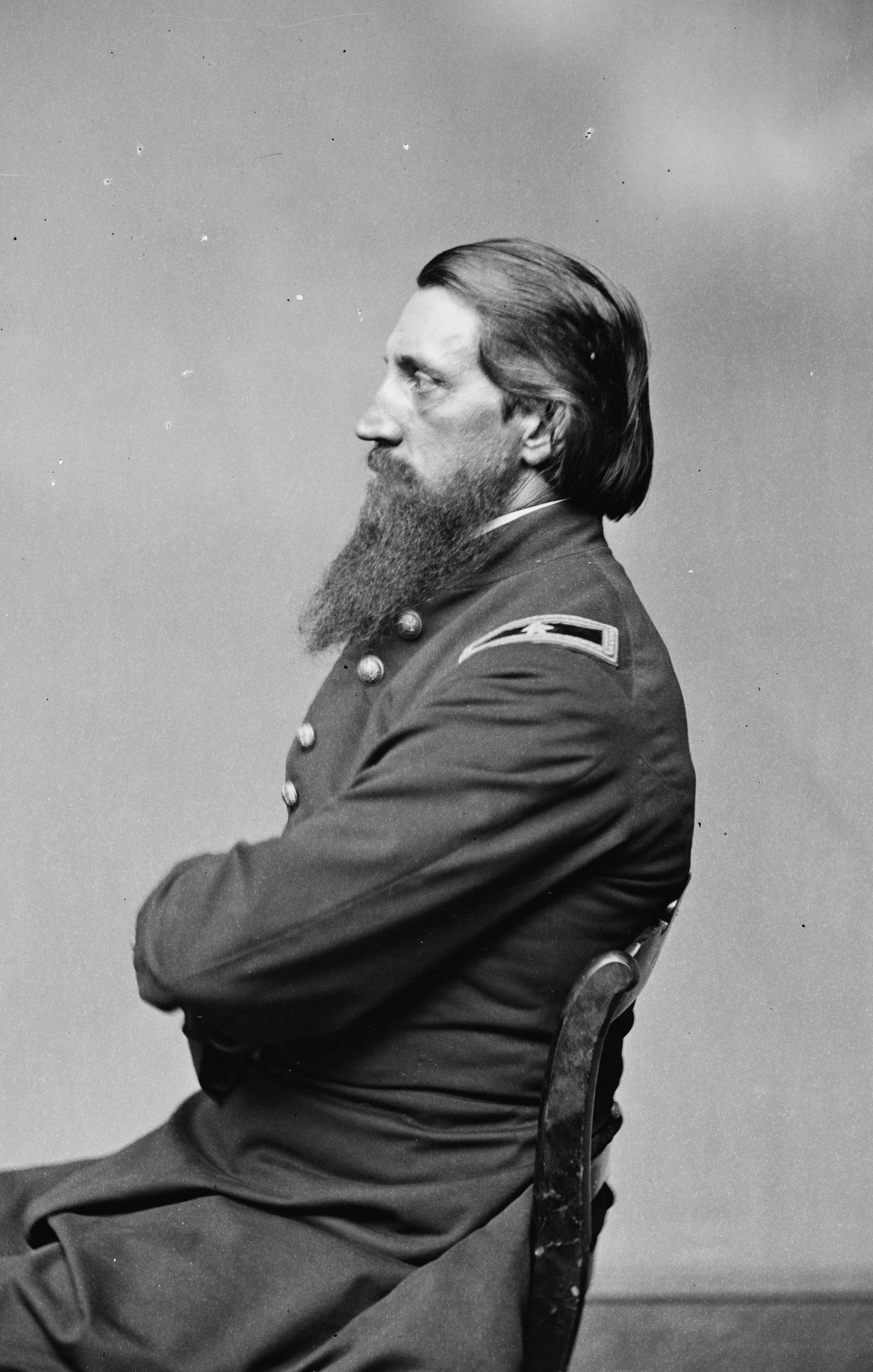
- Alfred W. Ellet
- Born: October 11, 1820; Bucks County, Pennsylvania, US
- Died: January 9, 1895 (aged 74); El Dorado, Kansas, US
- Burial place: Buena Vista Cemetery, El Dorado, Kansas
- Relatives: Charles Ellet, Jr., Charles Rivers Ellet, John A. Ellet
- Military career
- Allegiance: United States; Union
- Branch: United States Army; Union Army
- Service years: 1861–1864
- Rank: Brigadier General
- Units: 59th Illinois Infantry; United States Ram Fleet; Mississippi Marine Brigade
- Commands: United States Ram Fleet; Mississippi Marine Brigade
- Conflicts: American Civil War; Battle of Pea Ridge; First Battle of Memphis; Vicksburg Campaign; Battle of Richmond, Louisiana; Battle of Goodrich's Landing

Alfred Washington Ellet (October 11, 1820 – January 9, 1895) was a brigadier general in the Union Army who commanded the United States Ram Fleet and the Mississippi Marine Brigade during the American Civil War.

== Early life and education ==
Ellet was born at Penn's Manor in Bucks County, Pennsylvania. He was the youngest of six sons and the second youngest of fourteen children. In 1824, his family moved to Philadelphia where he attended the public schools. At age 16, he moved to Bunker Hill, Illinois and worked in farming.

A farmer and dry goods store owner, he was a resident of Illinois when the Civil War began.

== American civil war ==
In July 1861, Ellet raised a company of men from Bunker Hill and was commissioned captain of company I of the 9th Missouri Volunteer Infantry Regiment, which later became the 59th Illinois Volunteer Infantry Regiment. In March 1862, he fought in the Battle of Pea Ridge. When his elder brother, Col. Charles Ellet, Jr., created and took command of the United States Ram Fleet, a fleet of steam-powered rams, in the spring of 1862. Alfred became lieutenant colonel and second in command of the ram fleet.

=== First battle of Memphis ===
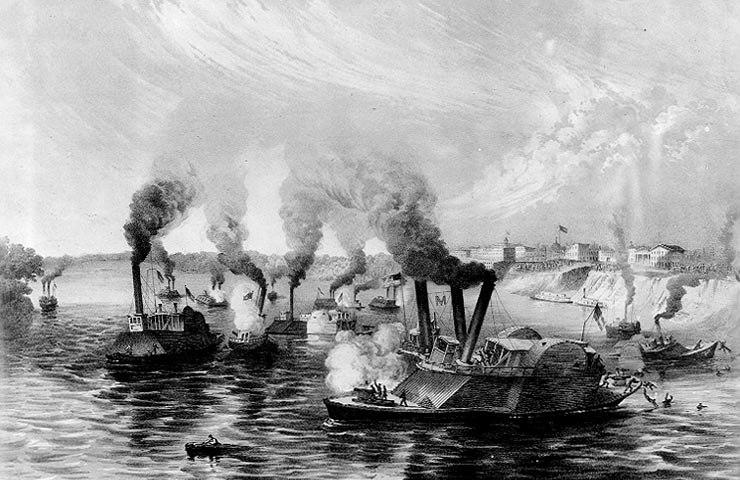
Ellet commanded the USS Monarch and forced the surrender of the CSS General Price during the First Battle of Memphis

On June 6, Colonel Charles Ellet, Jr. led the rams in the First Battle of Memphis as captain of USS Queen of the West with Alfred W. in command of the USS Monarch. The Ellets had not coordinated a plan of attack with Charles H. Davis, commander of the Mississippi River Squadron. When the flotilla approached Confederate forces, the two rams steamed ahead of Davis' gunboats. The Queen of the West rammed and sank the Confederate flagship CSS Colonel Lovell. The Monarch rammed and disabled the CSS General Price and forced her to ground on the riverbank. Charles Ellet, Jr. was wounded in the knee by a Confederate sharpshooter during the battle. His wound was the only serious casualty received on the Union side during the battle. Charles Ellet, Jr. died 15 days later from a blood infection caused by the wound and Alfred took command of the unit.

On June 26, Alfred W. Ellet commanded the Monarch and his nephew Charles Rivers Ellet commanded the Lancaster during action on the Yazoo River near Liverpool, Mississippi to capture or destroy three Confederate gunboats. The Confederates burned their ships; the CSS General Van Dorn, CSS General Polk and CSS Livingston, when they saw the Union forces approaching.

=== Mississippi Marine Brigade ===
On November 1, 1862, Ellet was promoted to brigadier general and charged with creation of the Mississippi Marine Brigade, an amphibious raiding unit. The unit was to contain an infantry regiment, two cavalry squadrons, an artillery battery and the U.S. Ram Fleet. Ellet had difficulties recruiting for the brigade and General Ulysses S. Grant was ordered to reinforce the Mississippi Marine Brigade with a company of men from the 18th Illinois Infantry Regiment. Ellet had to eventually request that General Henry Halleck allow his unit to recruit from convalescing veterans of other units. Ellet promised recruits bonuses, the opportunity to serve aboard clean vessels with good food and the potential for fame. He was eventually able to fully recruit for the brigade and his nephews Charles R. Ellet and John A. Ellet served under him.

On June 14, Ellet led the brigade along with Brigadier General Joseph A. Mower in the Battle of Richmond, Louisiana and skirmished with the Confederates, losing 3 wounded.

On June 30, Ellet led the brigade in action at the Goodrich's Landing. Two African-American Union regiments, the 1st Arkansas and the 10th Louisiana had come under attack from Confederate forces. The brigade arrived and pushed back the Confederate forces, suffering two casualties and one death.

In August 1863, the Mississippi Marine Brigade was placed under command of General Grant. Ellet continued to command the Mississippi Marine Brigade during operations on the Western Rivers until 1864, when the unit was disestablished. There were allegations of profiteering levied against Ellet due to irregularities in accounting of seized Confederate cotton. He resigned his commission late in 1864 and returned to civilian life.

Following the Civil War, Ellet was a businessman and civic leader in El Dorado, Kansas, where he died. He is buried there in Belle Vista Cemetery.

== Legacy ==
The U.S. Navy destroyer, USS Ellet (DD-398), in service in 1939–46, was named in honor of Ellet and other members of his family.

== See also ==
- List of American Civil War generals (Union)

== Sources ==
- Abbott, John S.C. (1866). Charles Ellet and His Naval Steam Rams. Harper's Magazine, Volume 32.
- Crandall, Warren Daniel (1907). History of the Ram Fleet and the Mississippi Marine Brigade in the War for the Union on the Mississippi and its tributaries: the story of the Ellets and their men. Press of the Buschart Brothers.
- Fowler, William M. (1990). Under Two Flags: The American Navy in the Civil War. Naval Institute Press. ISBN 978-1-61251-196-2.
- Hearn, Chester G. (2000). Ellet's Brigade: The Strangest Outfit of All. LSU Press. ISBN 0-8071-2559-8.
- Joiner, Gary D. (2007). Mr. Lincoln's Brown Water Navy - The Mississippi Squadron. Rowman & Littlefield Publishers, Inc. ISBN 978-0-7425-5097-1.
- Tomblin, Barbara Brooks (2016). The Civil War on the Mississippi: Union Sailors, Gunboat Captains, and the Campaign to Control the River. University Press of Kentucky. ISBN 978-0-8131-6703-9.
