= Charles R. Ellet =

American soldier, Union Army colonel (1843–1863)

Colonel Charles R. Ellet
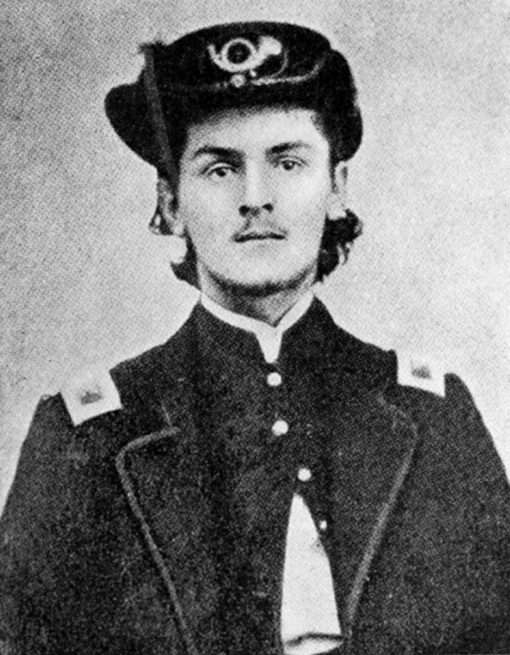
- Born: June 1, 1843; Georgetown, Washington, D.C., U.S.
- Died: October 29, 1863 (aged 20); Bunker Hill, Illinois, U.S.
- Burial place: Laurel Hill Cemetery, Philadelphia, Pennsylvania, U.S.
- Relatives: Charles Ellet, Jr. (father); Alfred W. Ellet (uncle); John A. Ellet (cousin)
- Military career
- Allegiance: United States; Union
- Branch: Union Army
- Service years: 1862–1863
- Rank: Colonel
- Units: United States Ram Fleet; Mississippi Marine Brigade
- Commands: United States Ram Fleet
- Conflicts: American Civil War; First Battle of Memphis; Vicksburg Campaign; Battle of Arkansas Post; Battle of Richmond, Louisiana; Battle of Goodrich's Landing

Charles Rivers Ellet (June 1, 1843 – October 29, 1863) was an American military officer who served as a colonel in the Union Army during the American Civil War. He served in the United States Ram Fleet under his father Charles Ellet, Jr. and as commanding officer of the ram fleet as part of the Mississippi Marine Brigade under his uncle Alfred W. Ellet. He commanded the ram ships USS Queen of the West, USS Switzerland, USS Lancaster and USS Monarch during the brown-water navy battle for control of the Mississippi River and its tributaries as part of the Vicksburg Campaign from 1862 to 1863.

At only nineteen years of age, he was one of the youngest colonels in the Union Army. His daring runs of two different ram ships past the batteries at Vicksburg as well as operations on the Yazoo River won him praise from William T. Sherman and David Dixon Porter. However, he was criticized by Porter when his aggressive actions on the Red River led to the capture of the Queen of the West by Confederate forces.

== Early life and education ==
Ellet was born on June 1, 1843 in the Georgetown neighborhood of Washington, D.C. He was the only son to the well-known civil engineer Charles Ellet Jr. In 1855, he traveled to Europe with his father and attended school in Paris for two years. He studied medicine at Georgetown University until the Civil War began. In 1861 he volunteered as an assistant surgeon and helped treat wounded soldiers from the First Battle of Bull Run in Washington, D.C.

== Civil war ==
Ellet joined the Union Army in the spring of 1862 as a medical cadet working as an assistant to a Union Army surgeon. He transferred to the United States Ram Fleet led by his father. The ram fleet was a Union Army unit of ram ships converted from commercial steamboats. In June 1862, he served in the First Battle of Memphis as a medical cadet on the Switzerland. He was one of the Union Army representatives that accepted the surrender of Memphis. Ellet and his cousin, Edward Ellet, lowered the Confederate flag over the Memphis post office and raised the American flag in its place. His father died from a wound received during the Battle of Memphis and command of the ram fleet went to his uncle Alfred W. Ellet.

=== Actions north of Vicksburg ===
On June 26, Alfred W. Ellet commanded the Monarch and Charles R. Ellet commanded the Lancaster during action on the Yazoo River near Liverpool, Mississippi, to capture or destroy three Confederate gunboats. The Confederates burned their ships; the CSS General Van Dorn, CSS General Polk and CSS Livingston, when they saw the Union forces approaching.

On July 15, Queen of the West, USS Carondelet, and USS Tyler engaged the Confederate ironclad ram CSS Arkansas on the Yazoo River. The Arkansas was heavily damaged but escaped into the Mississippi River and took refuge under the Confederate batteries at Vicksburg, Mississippi. On July 22, Queen of the West and USS Essex attacked Arkansas, despite the batteries at Vicksburg. During the engagement, the Queen of the West rammed Arkansas but inflicted only minor damage and rejoined the Mississippi River Squadron ships above Vicksburg.

In August, the USS Benton along with Ellet's rams Monarch and Lancaster, captured the CSS Fairplay at Milliken's Bend on the Mississippi River. When captured, the steamer was carrying five thousand muskets and ammunition headed for the Army of the Trans-Mississippi.

Ellet and the Queen of the West continued to support operations against Vicksburg. On September 19, while escorting two transport barges, the Queen of the West had a short engagement with Confederate infantry and artillery on the Mississippi River above Bolivar, Mississippi. Ellet and the Queen of the West also conducted operations in the Yazoo River clearing mines and engaging Confederate batteries.

In November 1862, the Mississippi Marine Brigade, an amphibious raiding unit, was organized by Alfred W. Ellet. The ram fleet was incorporated as a part of the brigade. On November 5, Charles was promoted to the rank of colonel and became the third member of the Ellet family to lead the ram fleet. Ellet was only 19 years old which made him one of the youngest colonels in the Union Army.

In December 1862, Ellet was assigned the task to arm the USS Lioness with a torpedo raft, known as a devil, and use it to destroy armed rafts on the Yazoo River directly in front of the batteries at Drumgold's Bluff. While the mission planned for December 31 was scrapped due to heavy fog, Admiral David Dixon Porter praised Ellet in a report to Secretary of War Edwin M. Stanton. Porter wrote, "Colonel Ellet took it upon himself the perilous duty of running up in the Lioness, in face of the batteries, to clear out the torpedoes or break the wires, and to plant torpedoes on the raft which had batteries at each end of it. No doubt he would have performed it or lost his life and his vessel. I have great confidence in the commander of the rams and those under him, and take this opportunity to state to the department how highly I appreciate the commander and his associates."

=== First run past Vicksburg ===
On February 2, 1863, Ellet was ordered by Admiral David Dixon Porter to run the Queen of the West past the batteries at Vicksburg, Mississippi, to support Admiral David Farragut below the city. The boat was equipped with a 30-pounder bow gun, three 12-pounder howitzers, cotton bales and wooden sheathing for protection. Major General William T. Sherman described Ellet as "full of energy and resources" in his preparations to run two of his rams past Vicksburg. Ellet intended to "run the gauntlet" of Vicksburg by cover of night, however delays resulted in passage of the guns at daybreak. The guns at Vicksburg fired for 50 minutes straight. The Queen of the West took 12 hits and lost a gun but made it past the batteries with minimal damage. The run provided the Union forces with insight as to where the guns at Vicksburg were positioned.

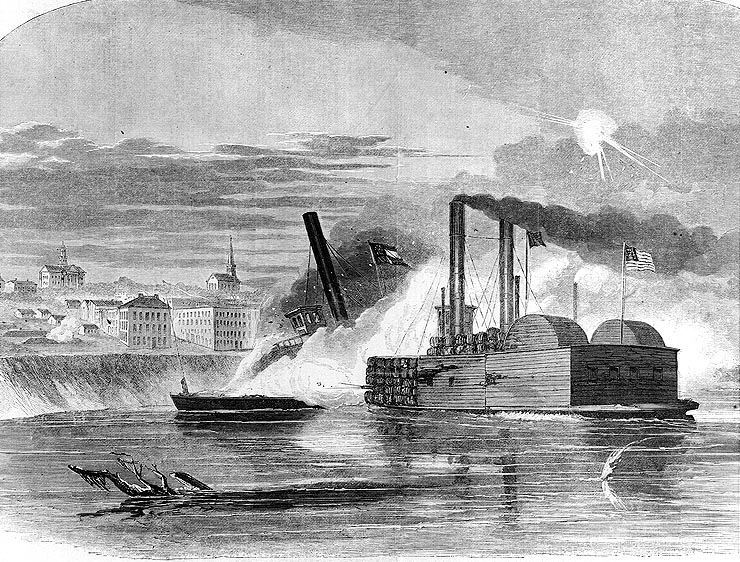
USS Queen of the West ramming the CSS City of Vicksburg

Once past the batteries, Ellet's orders were to intercept Confederate boat traffic at the mouth of the Red River and specifically destroy the CSS City of Vicksburg. Ellet found the City of Vicksburg docked, rammed her and set her ablaze with turpentine soaked balls fired from the guns of the Queen of the West. Ellet caused significant damage to the City of Vicksburg but failed to destroy her. The Queen of the West had to disengage before destroying the City of Vicksburg due to enemy fire which set the cotton bales aboard the Queen of the West ablaze.

Ellet recommended the Union forces supply the Queen of the West with fuel by floating an unmanned coal barge filled with 20,000 bushels of coal past the Vicksburg batteries at night. The barge went unnoticed by the Confederate forces and floated downriver ten miles (16 km) before being intercepted by the Queen of the West. The barge provided the Queen of the West with enough fuel to continue her mission.

On February 3, Ellet and the Queen of the West captured three Confederate transport ships – the CSS A.W. Baker, CSS Moro and CSS Berwick Bay. The Moro was empty of cargo since it had just dropped off supplies at Port Hudson, Louisiana. The other two ships were laden with food supplies headed toward Vicksburg.

The Queen of the West rendezvoused with the De Soto and on February 12, Ellet directed both ships down the Atchafalaya River to Simmesport, Louisiana, in search of Confederate forces. The crew went ashore, destroyed all supplies found and looted the residential area. On the way back up the Mississippi River, the Queen of the West received Confederate gun fire and the 1st mate was injured. In retaliation, Ellet and his crew burned three plantations that were believed to be the residences of those that injured the 1st mate.

=== Loss of the Queen of the West ===
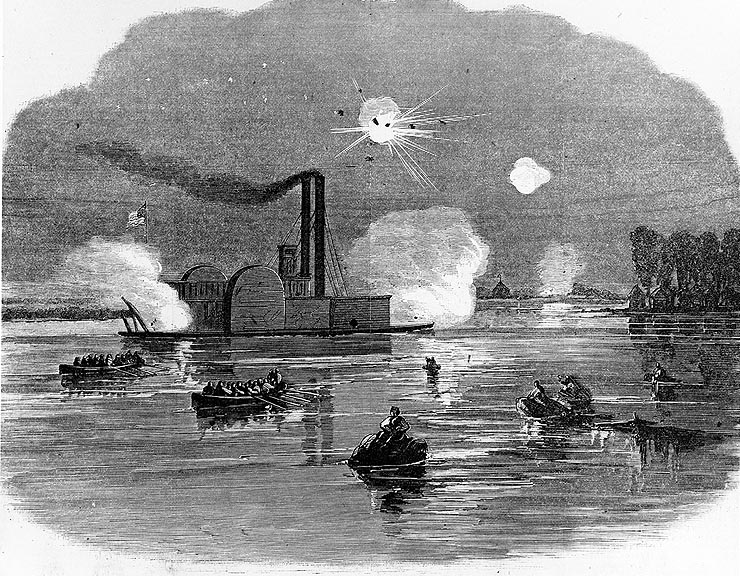
Capture of the Queen of the West by Confederate forces

On February 14, Ellet led the Queen of the West and De Soto up the Red River and captured the steamboat Era No. 5 carrying 4,500 bushels of corn. Ellet moved the Queen of the West upstream to investigate reports of steamships at Gordon's Landing near Marksville, Louisiana. She came under heavy fire by the shore batteries of Fort DeRussy and was run aground onto the right bank by her pilot instead of backing down river as ordered. She was directly in the sight of Confederate guns, which pounded her until Ellet ordered "abandon ship". The Queen of the West was not burned out of concern for the 1st mate, who was wounded and could not be moved. The USS Queen of the West was captured, repaired and re-entered into service as the CSS Queen of the West by the Confederate forces.

Ellet and the crew escaped and floated downstream on bales of cotton and were rescued by the De Soto. The De Soto and the Era No. 5 fled down the Red River to rejoin the Union forces. During their escape downstream, the pilot grounded the De Soto and severely damaged the paddles by continuing to run them long after contact, whereupon the pilot was placed under arrest by Ellet. In his official report, Ellet alleged the grounding was done purposely by the pilot, whom he accused of being a rebel sympathizer. The De Soto was set ablaze to prevent her capture by Confederate forces and Ellet and crew escaped on the Era No. 5.

The CSS Queen of the West joined forces with the CSS Webb to attack and sink the USS Indianola on the Mississippi River south of Vicksburg. In his report, Admiral David Dixon Porter criticized the aggressiveness of Ellet to continue up the Red River instead of maintaining guard at the mouth of the Red River and awaiting arrival of the Indianola. Porter wrote in his report, "Had the commander of the Queen of the West waited patiently, he would, in less than twenty-four hours, have been joined by the Indianola...This is a serious disappointment to us [above Vicksburg], as we calculated certainly on starving on the garrison at Port Hudson by merely blockading the mouth of the Red River. My plans were well laid, only poorly executed. I can give orders, but I cannot give officers good judgment." Porter also questioned whether Ellet and his crew abandoned the Queen of the West too easily since it was entered back into service by Confederate forces so quickly.

=== Second run past Vicksburg ===
On March 26, Ellet ran a second ram ship, the Switzerland, past the batteries at Vicksburg to support Admiral Farragut. Ellet commanded the Switzerland and his cousin, John A. Ellet, commanded the Lancaster. Both ships received heavy fire from the batteries and the Lancaster was run aground and sunk to avoid capture by the Confederate forces. The Switzerland was damaged but was repaired and continued duty on the Mississippi until Vicksburg and Port Hudson were captured by Union forces. Ellet also commanded the infantry of the Mississippi Marine Brigade until he requested a leave of absence due to poor health. He tendered his resignation on August 14, 1863. Command of the ram fleet went to his cousin John A. Ellet.

== Death and legacy ==
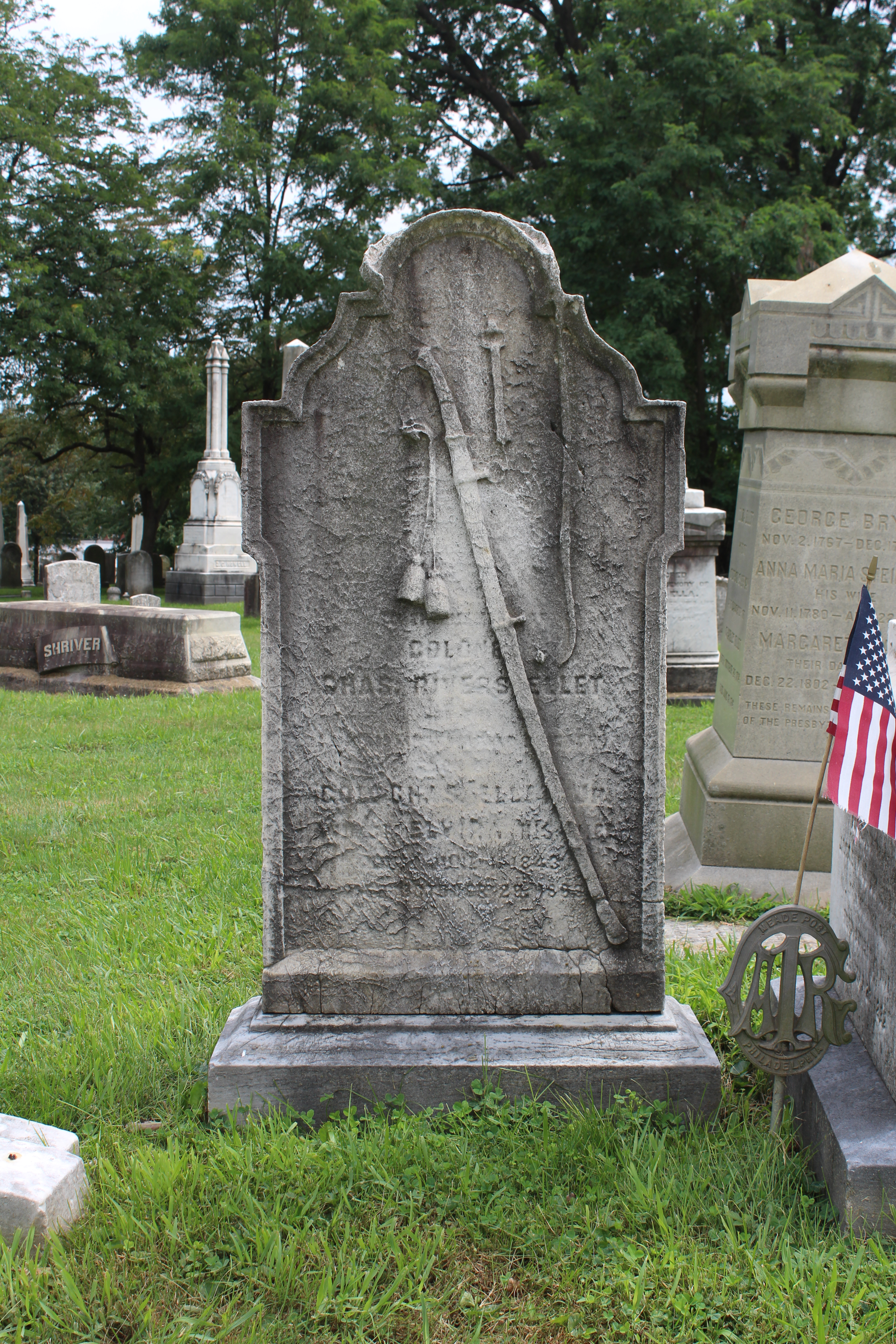
Charles Rivers Ellet was interred at Laurel Hill Cemetery in Philadelphia

After leaving the military, Ellet recuperated at the home of his uncle Dr. E.C. Ellet in Bunker Hill, Illinois. Ellet was a chronic sufferer from migraines, which he treated with laudanum. On the evening before his death, Ellet complained he did not feel well and was going to take medication for "the pain in his face". He died during the night of October 29, 1863 from what was most likely an accidental overdose by a self-administered injection of morphine. He was known to have previously prepared and administered self-injections of morphine. He was interred at Laurel Hill Cemetery in Philadelphia next to his father.

The US Navy destroyer USS Ellet, in service from 1939 to 1946, was named in honor of Charles Rivers Ellet and other members of his family.
