= John A. Ellet =

American soldier (1838–1892)

- Born: June 22, 1838
- Died: April 12, 1892 (aged 53); Boulder, Colorado, US
- Burial place: Columbia Cemetery
- Relatives: Charles Ellet, Jr. (uncle); Alfred W. Ellet (uncle); Charles R. Ellet (cousin)
- Military career
- Allegiance: United States of America
- Branch: Union Army
- Service years: 1863
- Rank: Lieutenant colonel
- Commands: United States Ram Fleet
- Conflicts: American Civil War

John Alfred Ellet (June 22, 1838–April 12, 1892) was a lieutenant colonel in the United States Army during the American Civil War.

He commanded the ram USS Lancaster until she sank on March 23, 1863, while attempting to steam past the batteries of Vicksburg, Mississippi, at night. He served as commanding officer of the United States Ram Fleet after his cousin Charles Rivers Ellet stepped down due to illness.

He was the son of Johan Israel and Laura (Scarlett) Ellet, nephew of Colonel Charles Ellet, Jr. and Brigadier General Alfred W. Ellet and cousin to Charles Rivers Ellet.

He died in Boulder, Colorado and was interred at Columbia Cemetery.

== Namesakes ==
USS Ellet (DD-398), which was in service in 1939–46, was named in honor of John A. Ellet and other members of his family.
