= Charles Ellet Jr. =

American civil engineer (1810–1862)

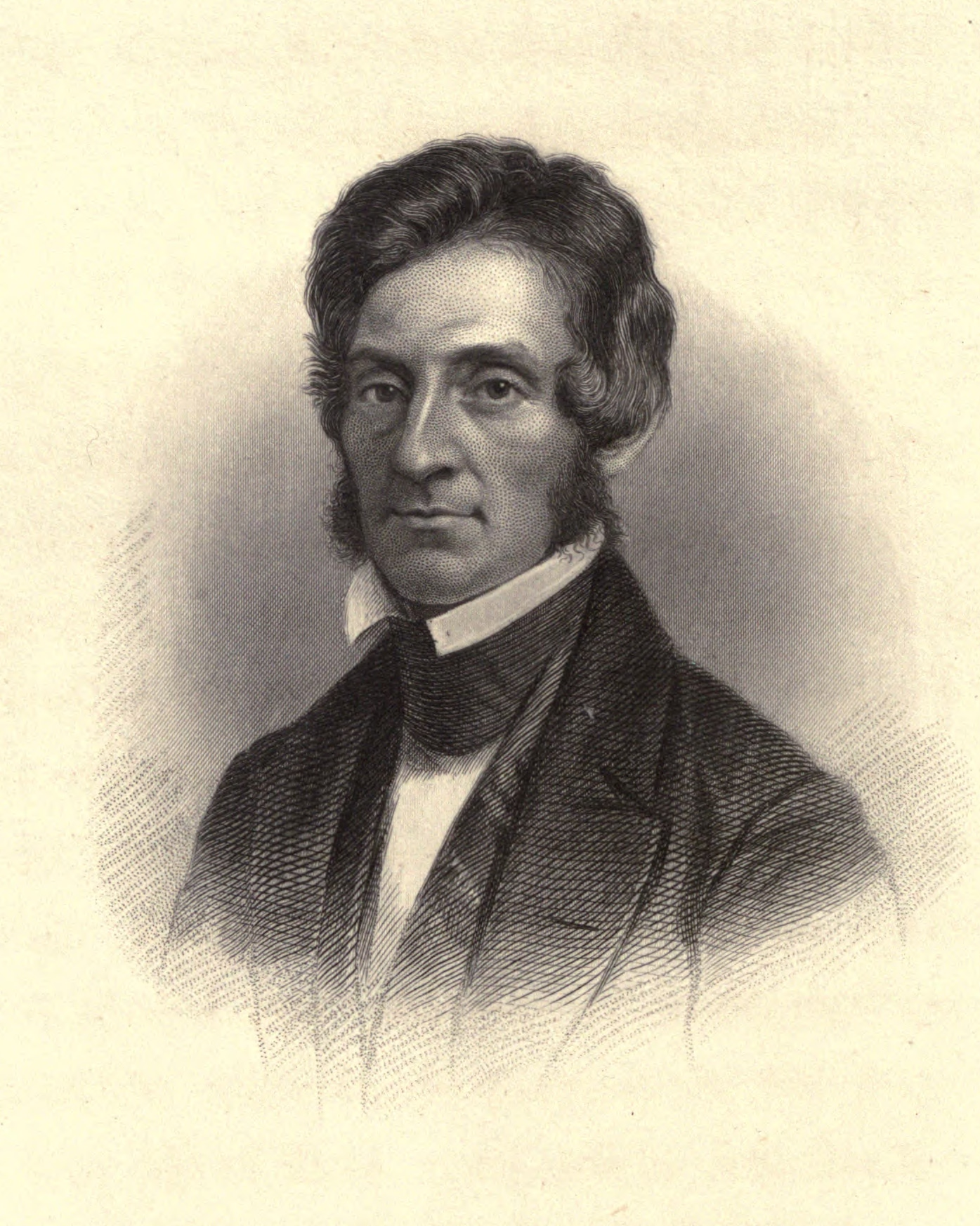
- Born: January 1, 1810; Bucks County, Pennsylvania, U.S.
- Died: June 21, 1862 (aged 52); Cairo, Illinois, U.S.
- Burial place: Laurel Hill Cemetery, Philadelphia, Pennsylvania, U.S.
- Relatives: Mary Virginia Ellet Cabell (daughter); Charles R. Ellet (son); Alfred W. Ellet (brother); John A. Ellet (nephew)
- Military career
- Allegiance: United States of America
- Branch: Union Army
- Service years: 1862
- Rank: Colonel
- Commands: United States Ram Fleet
- Conflicts: American Civil War: First Battle of Memphis (DOW)

Charles Ellet Jr. (1 January 1810 – 21 June 1862) was an American civil engineer from Pennsylvania who designed and constructed major canals, suspension bridges and railroads. He designed and supervised construction of the Wheeling Suspension Bridge, the longest suspension bridge in the world, from 1849 to 1851. He conducted the first Federal survey of the Mississippi and Ohio rivers as part of the U. S. Army Corps of Engineers.

Ellet published multiple books and essays on wide-ranging topics including macroeconomic theory, suspension bridge construction, railroad construction, river flood control and steam powered battery rams.

During the American Civil War, Ellet received a commission as colonel and created and commanded the United States Ram Fleet, a Union Army unit of ram ships converted from commercial steamers. His ram ships played a critical role in the Union naval victory at the First Battle of Memphis. He was wounded during the battle (the only casualty on the Union side) and died soon after.

== Early life and education ==
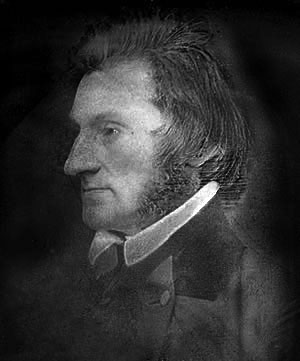
Daguerreotype of Charles Ellet Jr.

Ellet was born on January 1, 1810, at Penn's Manor in Bucks County, Pennsylvania. He was the sixth child of 14 born to Charles Ellet Sr. and Mary Israel. He studied at the Bristol school and worked as a rodman, measuring for the Chesapeake and Ohio Canal and making drawings. Benjamin Wright promoted him to Assistant Engineer of the Fifth Residency, but in 1830, he resigned to continue his studies in Paris, where he studied civil engineering at École nationale des Ponts et Chaussées.

== Family ==
Both Ellet's maternal and paternal grandfathers served in the American Revolutionary War. His father was a Quaker and a descendant of Samuel Carpenter, who served as Deputy Governor of colonial Pennsylvania.

Ellet's maternal grandfather, Israel Israel, descended from a family of Jewish diamond cutters from Holland and was a member of Pennsylvania's Committee of Safety and a recognized active patriot. His maternal grandmother, Hannah Erwin, was from a Quaker family. Ellet's younger brother, Alfred W. Ellet, served as a brigadier general in the Union Army during the Civil War, and succeeded Charles as commander of the United States Ram Fleet following his death. Another relative, nephew John A. Ellet, served as a lieutenant colonel, commanding the ram USS Lancaster.

Ellet married Elvira Augusta Stuart Daniel on November 7, 1837, in Lynchburg, Virginia. Her father was Virginia lawyer and soon-to-be judge William Daniel and her mother was Margaret Baldwin. She could trace her descent among the First Families of Virginia and owned enslaved persons, although Ellet himself never did. Judge Daniel's father (also a lawyer and judge of the same name William Daniel Sr.) had served as an ensign during the Revolutionary war under Captain Arda Allen, and his wife's maternal grandfather, Dr. Cornelius Baldwin, had served as a surgeon for the patriot cause throughout the conflict. Their son Charles Rivers Ellet also served as a colonel in the Union Army and commander of the United States Ram Fleet. Their daughter Mary Virginia Ellet Cabell (1839–1930) would become the second wife of William Daniel Cabell in 1867 and became a founding member of the Daughters of the American Revolution.

== Engineering career ==
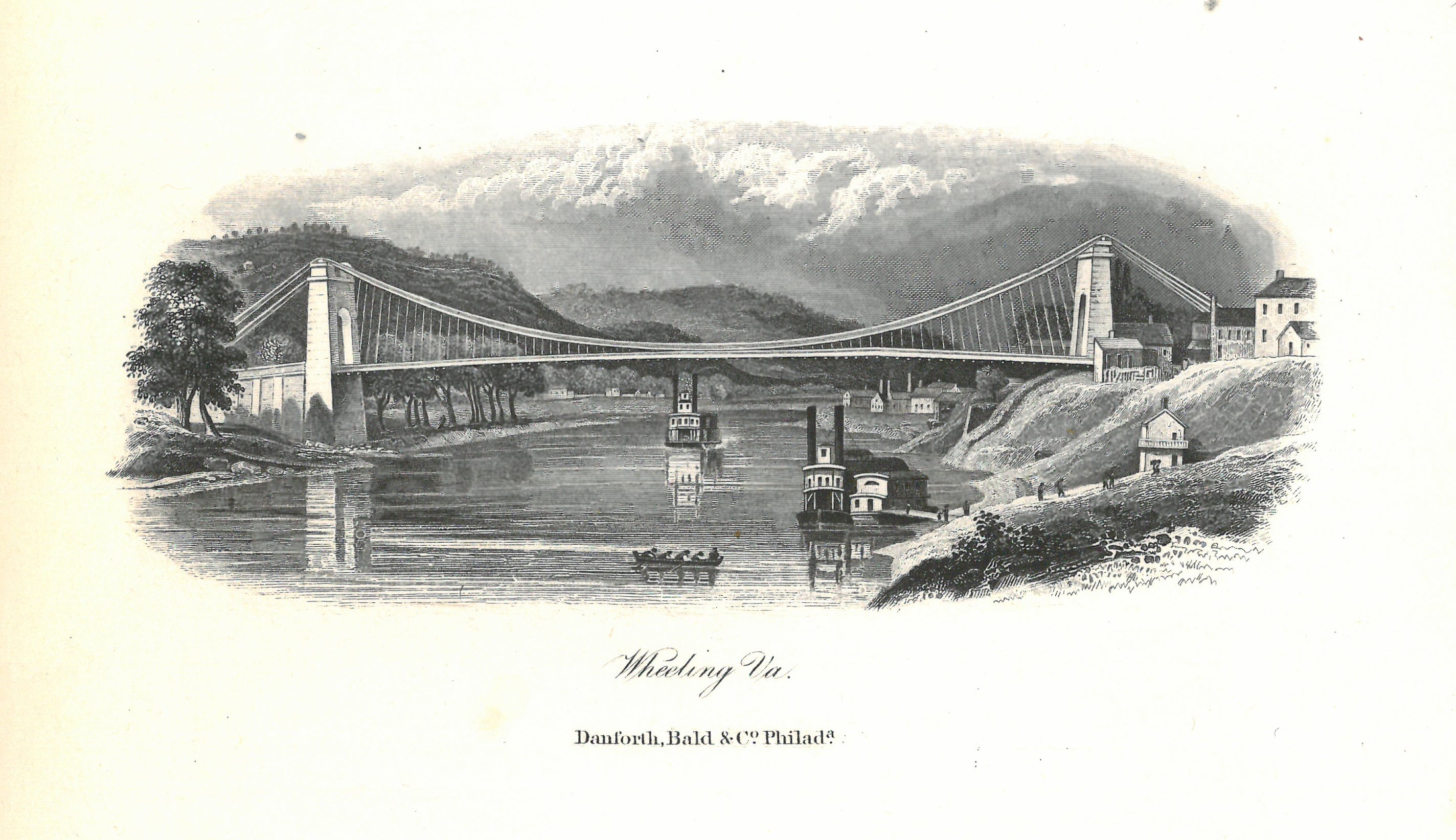
Wheeling Suspension Bridge circa 1850

After returning from Europe, Ellet worked on the Utica and Schenectady Railroad and was appointed to conduct a survey of the Western New York section of the New York and Erie Railroad. In 1832, he submitted a proposal to Congress for a suspension bridge across the Potomac River, but it was rejected. In 1842, he designed and built the second Spring Garden Street bridge, which was the first major wire-cable suspension bridge in the United States, spanning 358 feet over the Schuylkill River at Fairmount, Philadelphia, Pennsylvania. He was elected as a member to the American Philosophical Society in 1843.

Ellet supervised the construction of the James River and Kanawha Canal in Virginia. From 1846 to 1847, he worked as president of the Schuylkill Navigation Company in Pennsylvania and supervised improvements to the canal used for transporting anthracite coal. He also constructed railroads in those states. Ellet developed theories for improving flood control and navigation of Midwestern rivers.

In 1848, Ellet built the record-breaking Wheeling suspension bridge over the Ohio River at Wheeling, West Virginia, with a span over 1,000 feet. In the same year, he erected the Niagara Falls Suspension Bridge, the first ever railway suspension bridge over the Niagara Gorge with a 770-foot span.

In 1850, the Secretary of War, conforming to an Act of Congress, directed Ellet to make surveys and reports on the Mississippi and Ohio Rivers with a view to the preparation of adequate plans for flood prevention and navigation improvement. His detailed report had considerable influence on later engineering thought and navigation improvements. His Report of the Overflows of the Delta of the Mississippi River helped to reshape the New Orleans waterfront. George Perkins Marsh published Man and Nature 14 years later, but it was Ellet who first noted in writing that the artificial embankments created an overflowing delta. However, only decades later would his assertions be taken seriously and used in flood control decisions.

== United States Ram Fleet ==
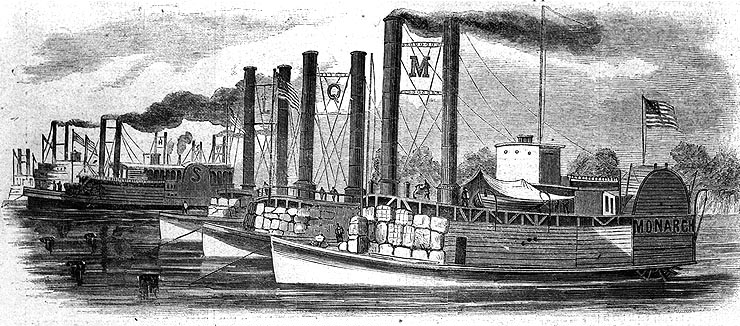
An engraving from Harper's Weekly depicting the United States Ram Fleet ships USS Monarch, USS Queen of the West, USS Lioness and USS Switzerland

In September 1854, while travelling overseas, Ellet learned that the 250-ton SS Vesta had accidentally rammed and sank the 2,794-ton SS Arctic. This incident convinced Ellet that with the development of steam propulsion, ramming could be a very effective form of naval combat. The Crimean War was underway and Ellet offered his services to the Russian government to build a fleet of ram ships to help them defeat the naval blockade in the Black Sea during the Siege of Sebastopol. He received interest from the Russian government, but the plans were scrapped after the Russian Czar died. Ellet became enthusiastic about the possibility of a ram fleet and wrote to the U.S. Navy with his plan, but was unable to persuade them of the benefit. He published the pamphlet Coast and Harbor Defenses, or the Substitution of Steam Battering Rams for Ships of War in late 1855, hoping to gain public interest.

When the Civil War broke out, Ellet renewed his advocacy especially in light of the Confederate build up of ram ships. He even wrote directly to President Lincoln urging him to increase funding for the United States Army Corps of Engineers and offered to his knowledge of Virginia's terrain and infrastructure to cut off Confederate supply lines and to build steam-powered ram ships to protect northern ports. Lincoln told Ellet to seek opinions from U.S. Generals: Winfred Scott, George B. McClellan and James Totten. Lincoln's letter to Ellett was carried to the home of McClellan, who refused to see Ellet or consider his proposal. The Confederate forces captured the USS Merrimack at the Norfolk Navy Yard and converted her to a ram ship. Despite the vessel's being bulky and slow-moving, the Union forces became convinced of the possibility of ram ships when the Merrimack, renamed CSS Virginia, sank the USS Cumberland and USS Congress at Hampton Roads. The Navy still ignored him, but in March 1862, Secretary of War Edwin M. Stanton, familiar with his work on the Wheeling Suspension Bridge and other projects, appointed Ellet colonel of engineers and authorized him to form the United States Ram Fleet on the Mississippi River. The Union Navy's Mississippi River Squadron and the Confederate River Defense Fleet were battling for control of the Mississippi and Stanton believed the Union Navy would benefit from the addition of ram ships. Ellet and the ram fleet were outside of the navy's direct chain of command and reported directly to Stanton.

Ellet purchased the nine of the fastest river steamboats available on the Ohio River and converted them to rams. He assigned family members as captains of the other rams, including his brother Alfred W. Ellet, his son Charles Rivers Ellet and his nephew John A. Ellet.

On May 25, 1862, Ellet and the ram fleet joined the Mississippi River Squadron, led by Charles H. Davis, on the Mississippi River north of Fort Pillow, Tennessee. Davis had little faith in the effectiveness of the rams, but allowed the fleet to accompany his gunboats down the river to Memphis.

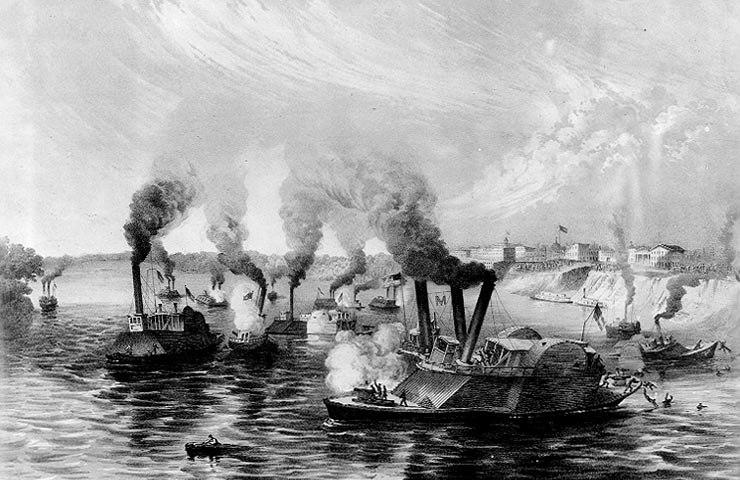
Ellet's ram ships helped the Union achieve a decisive victory at the First Battle of Memphis

On June 6, Ellet led the rams in the First Battle of Memphis as captain of USS Queen of the West with his brother Alfred W. in command of the USS Monarch. The Ellets had not coordinated a plan of attack with Davis and when the flotilla approached Confederate forces, the two rams steamed ahead of Davis' gunboats. The Queen of the West rammed and sank the Confederate flagship CSS Colonel Lovell. After the collision, the Queen of the West came under attack from the CSS Sumter and the CSS Beauregard. The attack sheared off one of the paddle wheels from the Queen of the West and forced her to ground on the riverbank. The Monarch rammed and disabled the CSS General Price and forced her to ground on the riverbank also. Ellet sent a boarding party and captured the General Price. Ellet was wounded in the knee by a Confederate sharpshooter during the battle. His wound was the only serious casualty received on the Union side during the battle.

The Confederate forces suffered a severe loss at the Battle of Memphis with heavy casualties and the loss of seven of their eight ships.

== Death and legacy ==
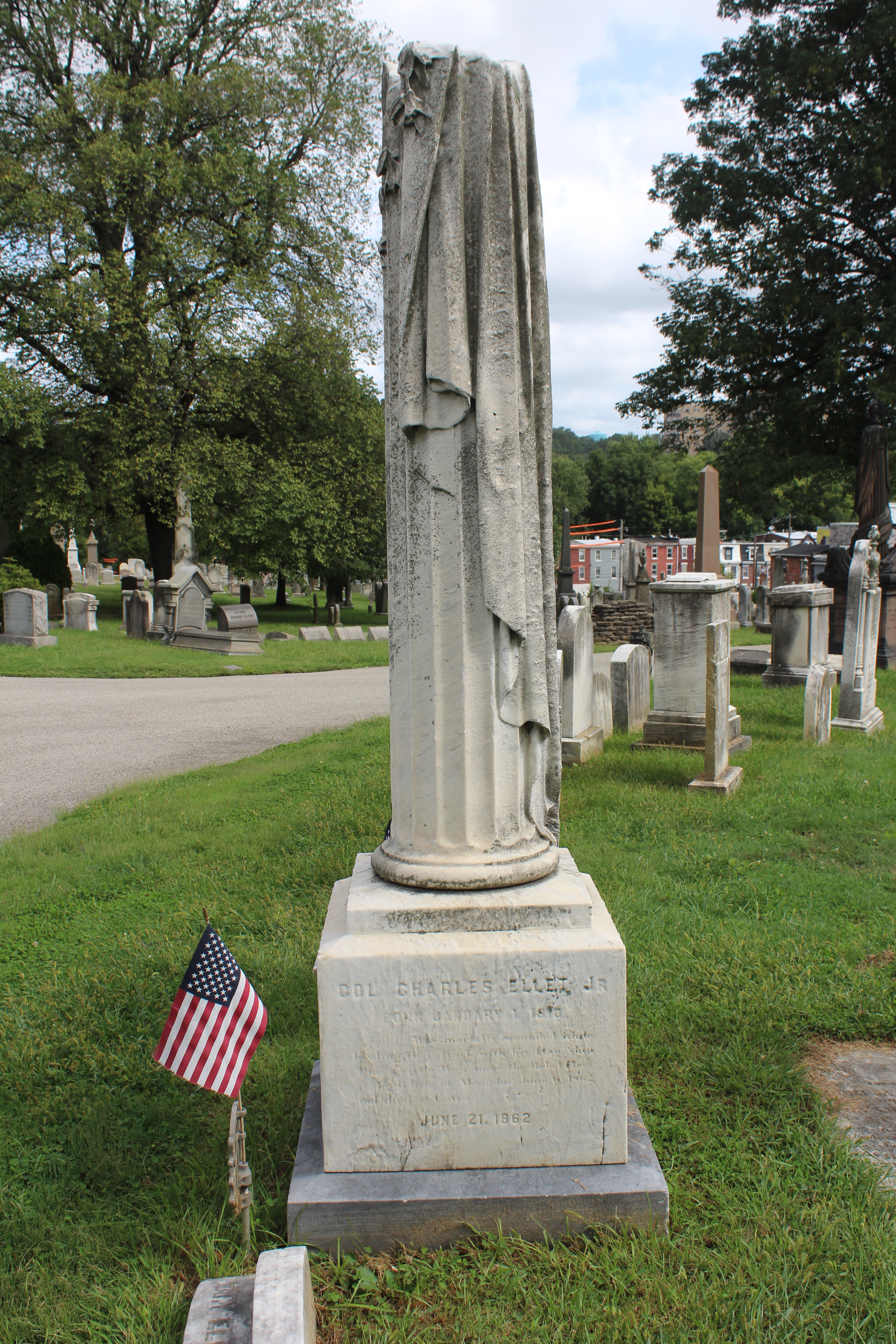
Charles Ellet Jr Gravestone in Laurel Hill Cemetery

Ellet refused to consider amputation for his injury., and his wound became infected and he died 15 days later of a blood infection in Cairo, Illinois. His body was taken to Independence Hall in Philadelphia, where he was given a state funeral. He was interred at Laurel Hill Cemetery. Command of the ram fleet went to his brother Alfred W. Ellet.

The U.S. Navy named a destroyer to honor the Ellet family. USS Ellet (DD-398) was in service in 1939–46 during World War II.

In 1994, Stanford University received a gift of Ellet's Civil War letters from Elizabeth Ellet Nitz and Frances Ellet Ward. The papers are housed in the Department of Special Collections at the university's Library.

On November 6, 1999, the Wheeling, West Virginia chapter of the Daughters of the American Revolution placed a commemorative plaque on the western abutment of the Wheeling Suspension Bridge recognizing Ellet's accomplishments and his daughter, Mary Virginia Ellet Cabell's, role in founding the Daughters of the American Revolution.

In 2000, Ellet was inducted into the National Rivers Hall of Fame at the National Mississippi River Museum & Aquarium.

== Bibliography ==
- An Essay on the Laws of Trade, in Reference to the Works of Internal Improvement in the United States, Richmond: P. D. Bernard, 1839
- A popular exposition of the incorrectness of the tariffs of toll in use on the public improvements of the United States. 1839. Philadelphia: C. Sherman & Co.. Accessed at Haithitrust.
- Exposition of the causes which have conduced to the failure of many railroads in the United States. (1841) Accessed at Haithitrust.
- A Popular Notice of Suspension Bridges, With a Brief Description of the Wire Bridge Across the Schuykill, Fairmount. Philadelphia: John C. Clark & Sons, 1843
- The Position and Prospects of the Schuykill Navigation Company, Philadelphia, 1845
- The Reading Railroad Company. New-York, 1845. Accessed at Haithitrust.
- Contribution to the Physical Geography of the United States. Part 1. Of the Physical Geography of the Mississippi Valley, with Suggestions for the Improvement of Navigation of the Ohio and Other Rivers, Smithsonian Institution, 1849
- Report on a Suspension Bridge Across the Potomac for Rail Road and Common Travel, Philadelphia: John C. Clark, 1852
- Report on the Overflows of the Delta of the Mississippi, Washington: A. Boyd Hamilton, 1852
- The Mississippi and Ohio Rivers: Containing Plans for the Protection of the Delta from Inundation; and Investigations of the Practicality and Cost of Improving the Navigation of the Ohio and Other Rivers by Means of Reservoirs with an Appendix on the Bars at the Mouths of the Mississippi, Philadelphia: Lippincott, Grambo and Co., 1853
- Subscriptions to Western Railroads, Addressed to the President and Directors of the Pennsylvania Rail Road Company, Philadelphia: John C. Clark & Sons, 1854
- Coast and Harbour Defenses, or the Substitution of Steam Battering Rams for Ships of War, Philadelphia: John C. Clark & Sons, 1855
- The Mountain Top Track: A Description of the Railroad Across the Blue Ridge at Rock Fish Gap in the State of Virginia, Philadelphia: T.K. & P.G. Collins, 1856

== Sources ==
- Abbott, John S.C. (1866). Charles Ellet and His Naval Steam Rams. Harper's Magazine, Volume 32.
- Crandall, Warren Daniel; Newell, Isaac Denison (1907). History of the Ram Fleet and the Mississippi Marine Brigade in the War for the Union on the Mississippi and its tributaries: the story of the Ellets and their men. Press of the Buschart Brothers.
- Fowler, William M. (1990). Under Two Flags: The American Navy in the Civil War. Naval Institute Press. ISBN 978-1-61251-196-2.
- Hearn, Chester G. (2000). Ellet's Brigade: The Strangest Outfit of All. LSU Press. ISBN 0-8071-2559-8.
- Joiner, Gary D. (2007). Mr. Lincoln's Brown Water Navy – The Mississippi Squadron. Rowman & Littlefield Publishers, Inc. ISBN 978-0-7425-5097-1.
- Lewis, Gene D. (1968). Charles Ellet Jr.: The Engineer as Individualist. University of Illinois Press. ISBN 978-0-252-72525-8.
- Mahmoud, Khaled M. (2015). Sustainable Bridge Structures. CRC Press. ISBN 978-0-8078-3588-3.
- Steinman, D. B.; Watson, S. R. (1957). Bridges and their builders. New York, N.Y.: Dover Publications.
