= List of ships of the Confederate States Navy =

Seal of the Department of the Navy

This is a list of ships of the Confederate States Navy (CSN), used by the Confederate States of America during the American Civil War between 1861 and 1865. Included are some types of civilian vessels, such as blockade runners, steamboats, and privateers which contributed to the war efforts by the CSN. Also included are special types of floating batteries and harbor defense craft.

== CSN warships ==
The secretary of the CS Navy, Stephen Mallory, was very aggressive on a limited budget in a land-focused war, and developed a two-pronged warship strategy of building ironclad warships for coastal and national defense, and commerce raiding cruisers, supplemented with exploratory use of special weapons such as torpedo boats and torpedoes.

=== Batteries ===
Based upon the successful employment of ironclad warships, particularly batteries, at the Battle of Kinburn, Britain and France decided to focus on armor-plated warships, starting with coastal battery designs. Initial ocean going ironclad cruisers, such as the French Gloire and the British HMS Warrior were only just emerging in 1859 and 1860, and were beyond the budget and timeline necessary for rapid force deployment that the CS Navy needed for immediate coastal defenses in 1861.

Therefore, the Confederate Congress voted $2 million in May 1861 to buy ironclads from overseas, and in July and August started work on construction and converting wooden ships locally. On 12 October 1861, the Manassas became the first ironclad to enter battle when she fought Union warships on the Mississippi. In February 1862, the even larger Virginia joined the Confederate Navy, having been built at Norfolk. The Confederacy built a number of ships designed as versions of the Virginia, of which several saw action. In the failed attack on Charleston on April 7, 1863, two small ironclads, Palmetto State and Chicora participated in the successful defense of the harbor. For the later attack at Mobile Bay, the Union faced the Tennessee.

==== Ironclad steam-powered batteries ====
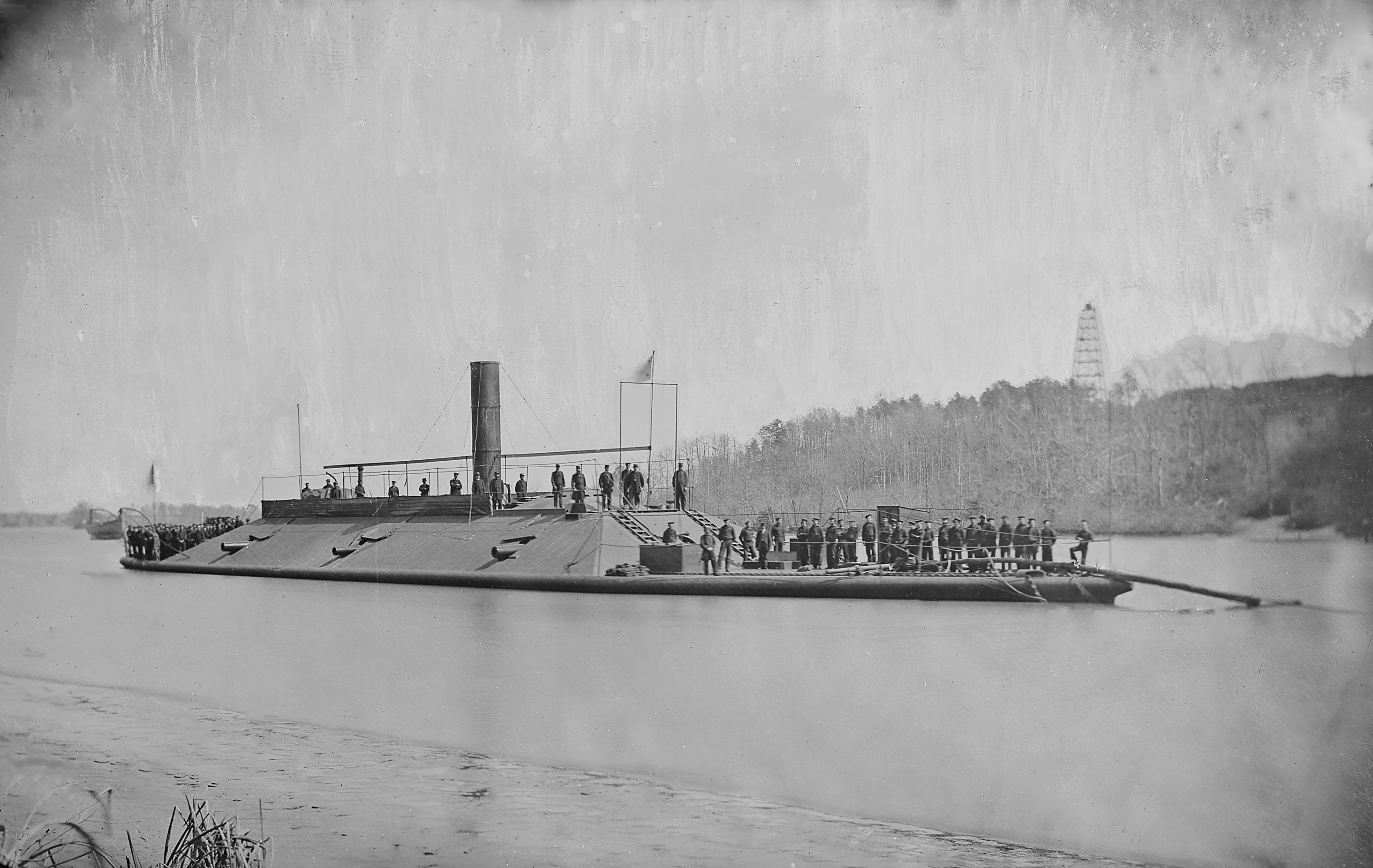
Ex-CSS USS Atlanta on the James River, photo by Mathew Brady

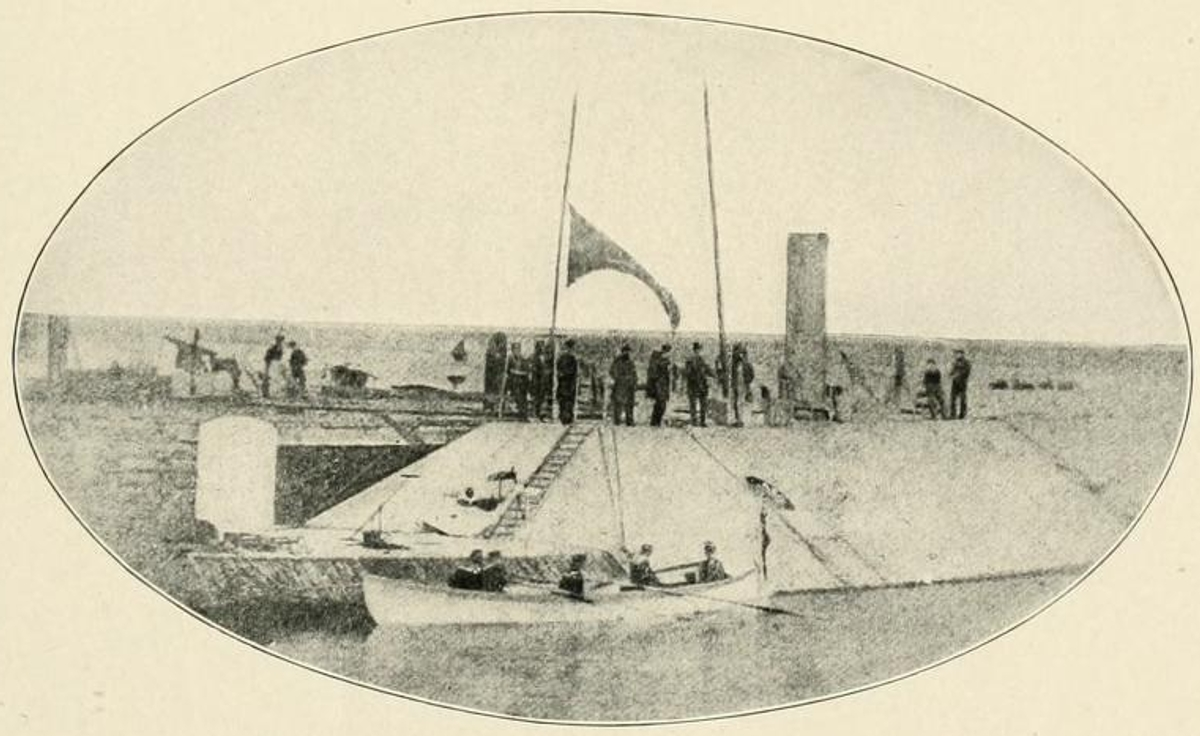
CSS Chicora

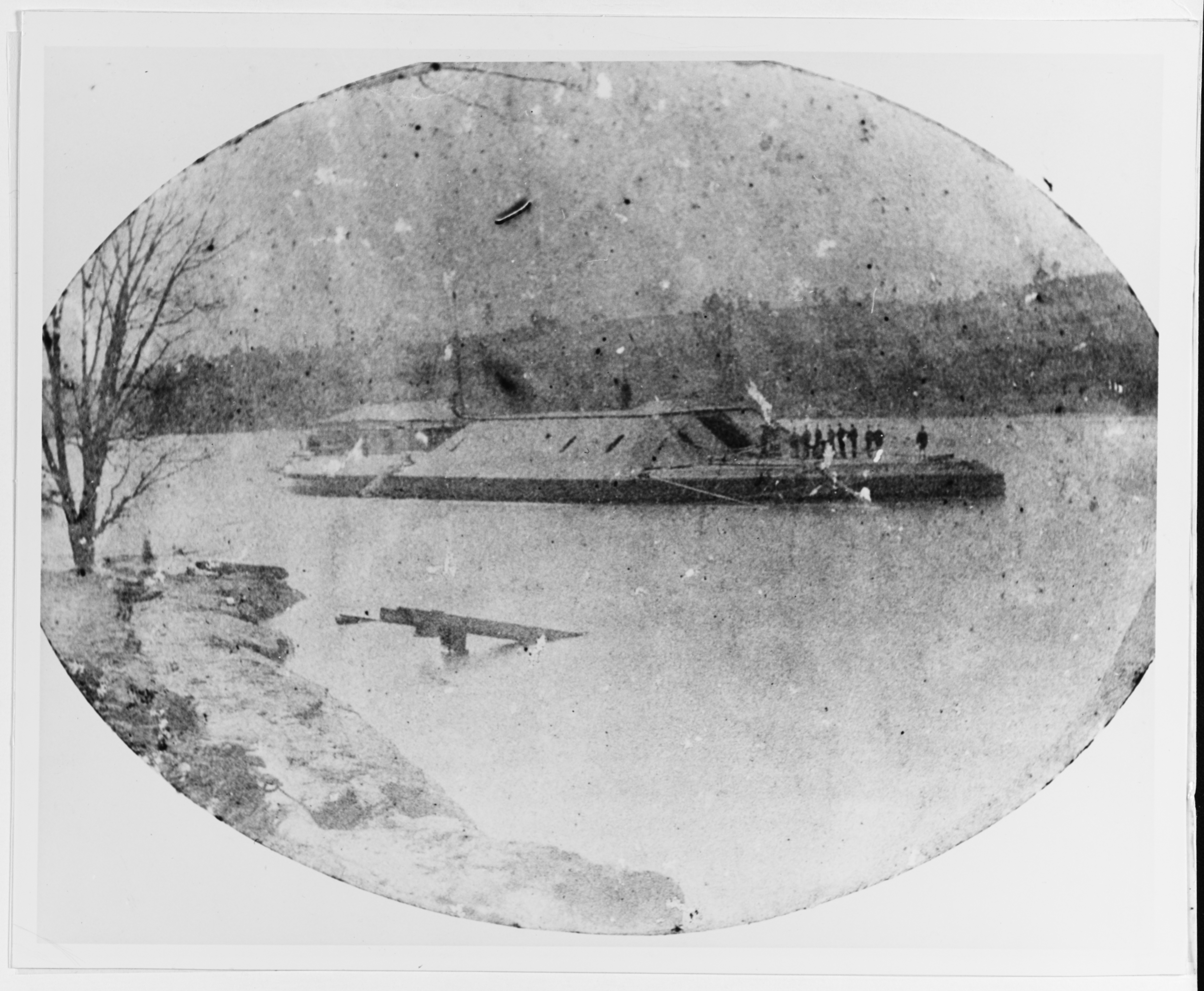
CSS Muscogee also known as CSS Jackson

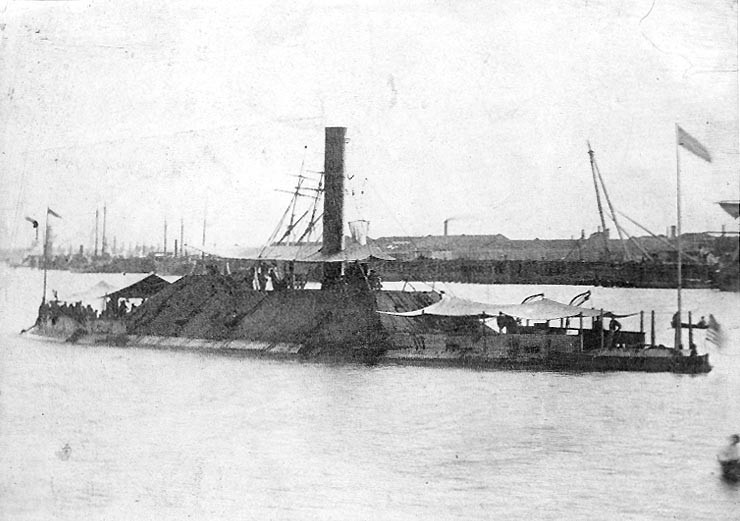
Ex-CSS USS Tennessee

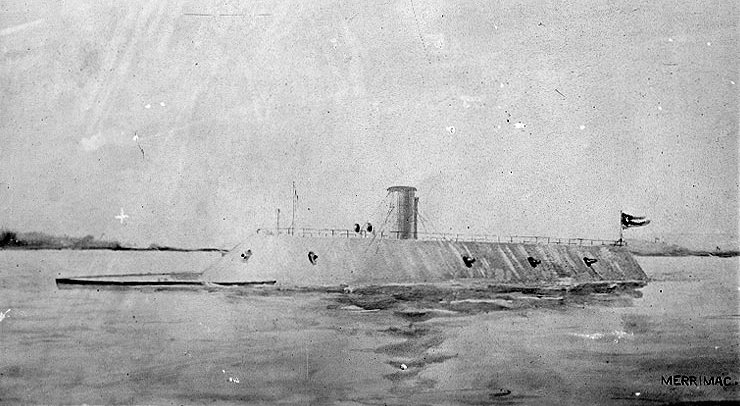
Ex-USS Merrimac/CSS Virginia

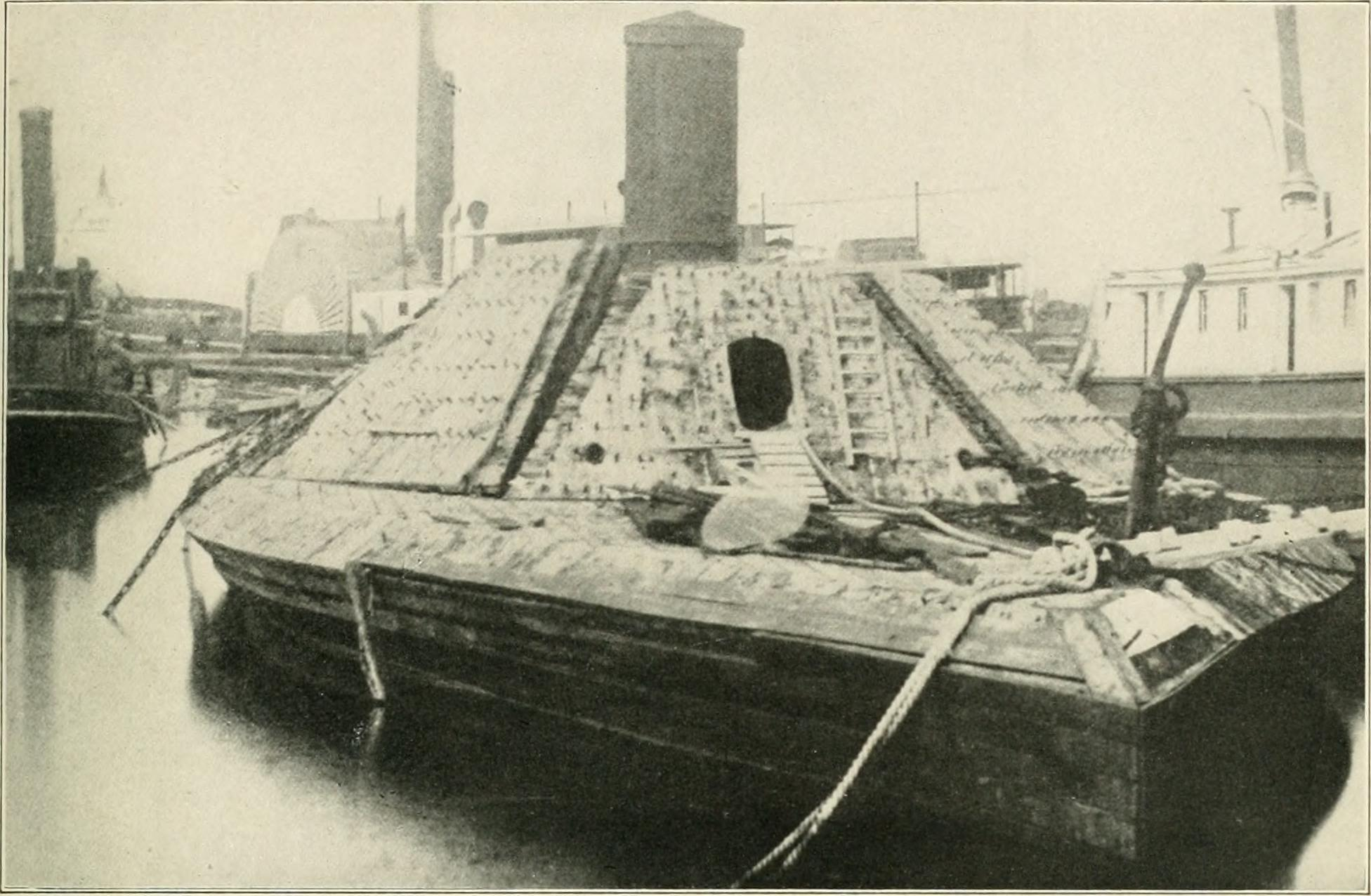
CSS Albemarle

The CS Navy ironclad steamer batteries were all designed for national coastal defense.

- CSS Albemarle, twin-screw steamer, ironclad ram, sunk: October 28, 1864
- CSS Arkansas, twin-screw steamer, ironclad ram, destroyed: August 5, 1862
- CSS Atlanta, triple-screw steamer, ironclad ram, captured: June 17, 1863
- CSS Baltic, side-wheel steamer, cotton-clad and ironclad ram, surrendered: May 10, 1865
- CSS Charleston, ironclad steam sloop, destroyed: February 18, 1865
- CSS Chicora, steamer, ironclad ram, destroyed: February 18, 1865
- CSS Columbia, single-screw steamer, ironclad ram, captured: April 26, 1865
- CSS Eastport, side-wheel steamer, ironclad gunboat, captured incomplete: February 8, 1862
- CSS Fredericksburg, twin-screw steamer, ironclad ram, destroyed: April 4, 1865
- CSS Huntsville, ironclad steam floating battery, scuttled: April 12, 1865
- CSS Louisiana, twin screw and double center-wheel steamer, ironclad, destroyed: April 28, 1862
- CSS Manassas, screw steamer, ironclad ram, sunk: April 24, 1862
- CSS Milledgeville, steamer, ironclad, burned incomplete: December 21, 1864
- CSS Mississippi, triple-screw steamer, ironclad, burned: April 25, 1862
- CSS Missouri, center-wheel steam sloop, ironclad ram, surrendered: June 3, 1865
- CSS Mobile, screw steamer, ironclad, burned before launching: May 21, 1863
- CSS Muscogee, twin-screw with center-wheel steamer, ironclad, burned: April 17, 1865
- CSS Nashville, side-wheel steamer, ironclad ram, surrendered: May 10, 1865
- CSS Neuse, twin-screw steam sloop, ironclad ram, destroyed: March 14, 1865
- CSS North Carolina, steam sloop, ironclad, accidentally sank: September 27, 1864
- CSS Palmetto State, sloop, ironclad ram, destroyed: 18 February 1865
- CSS Raleigh, steam sloop, ironclad, wrecked: May 7, 1864
- CSS Richmond, screw steamer, ironclad ram, scuttled: April 3, 1865
- CSS Savannah, steam sloop, ironclad, burned: December 21, 1864
- CSS Tennessee, twin-screw steamer, ironclad ram, destroyed before launching: June 5, 1862
- CSS Tennessee, single-screw steamer, ironclad ram, captured: August 5, 1864
- CSS Texas, twin-screw steamer, ironclad ram, never completed, captured: April 4, 1865
- CSS Tuscaloosa, ironclad steam floating battery, scuttled: April 12, 1865
- CSS Virginia, screw steamer, ironclad ram, destroyed: May 11, 1862
- CSS Virginia II, steam sloop, ironclad, destroyed: April 4, 1865
- CSS Wilmington, twin-screw steamer, ironclad gunboat, destroyed before completion: January 1865

==== Ironclad floating batteries ====
CS Navy ironclad floating batteries lacked steam engines for propulsion and were towed into firing positions.

- CSS Arctic, ironclad floating battery, scuttled: 24 December 1864
- CSS Georgia, ironclad floating battery, scuttled: December 21, 1864
- CSS Phoenix, ironclad floating battery, destroyed: 1865

==== Wooden floating batteries ====
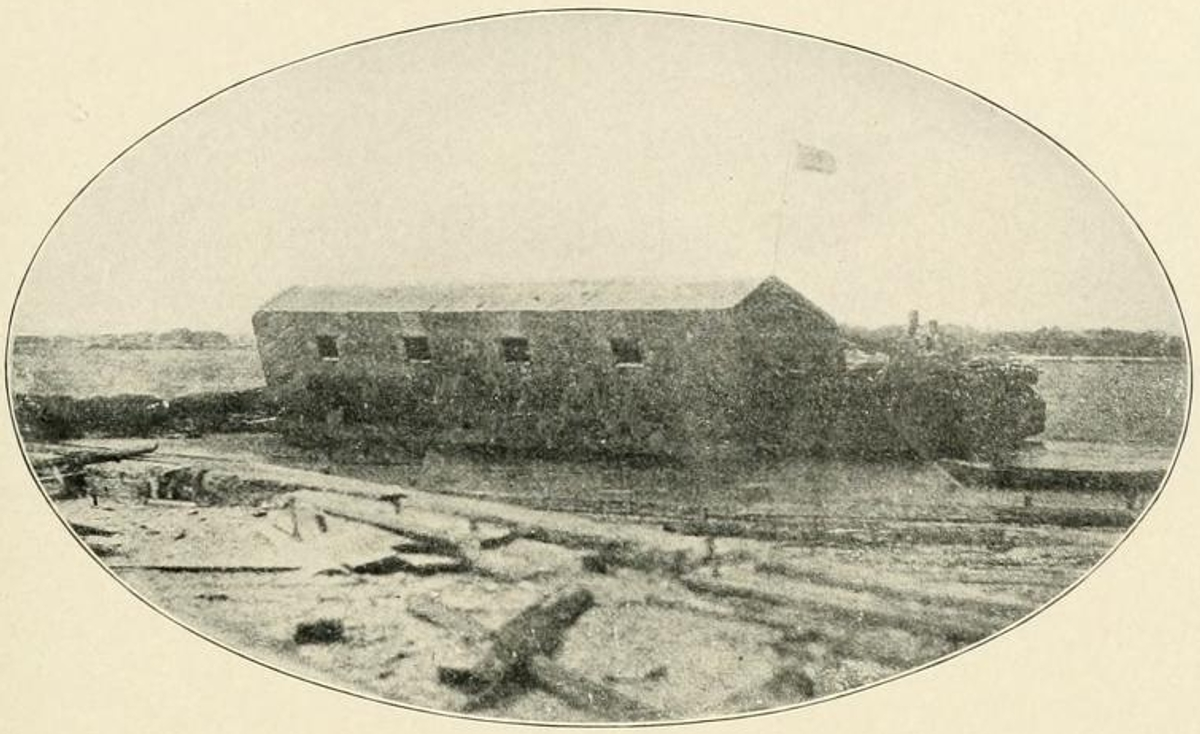
The Floating Battery of Charleston Harbor

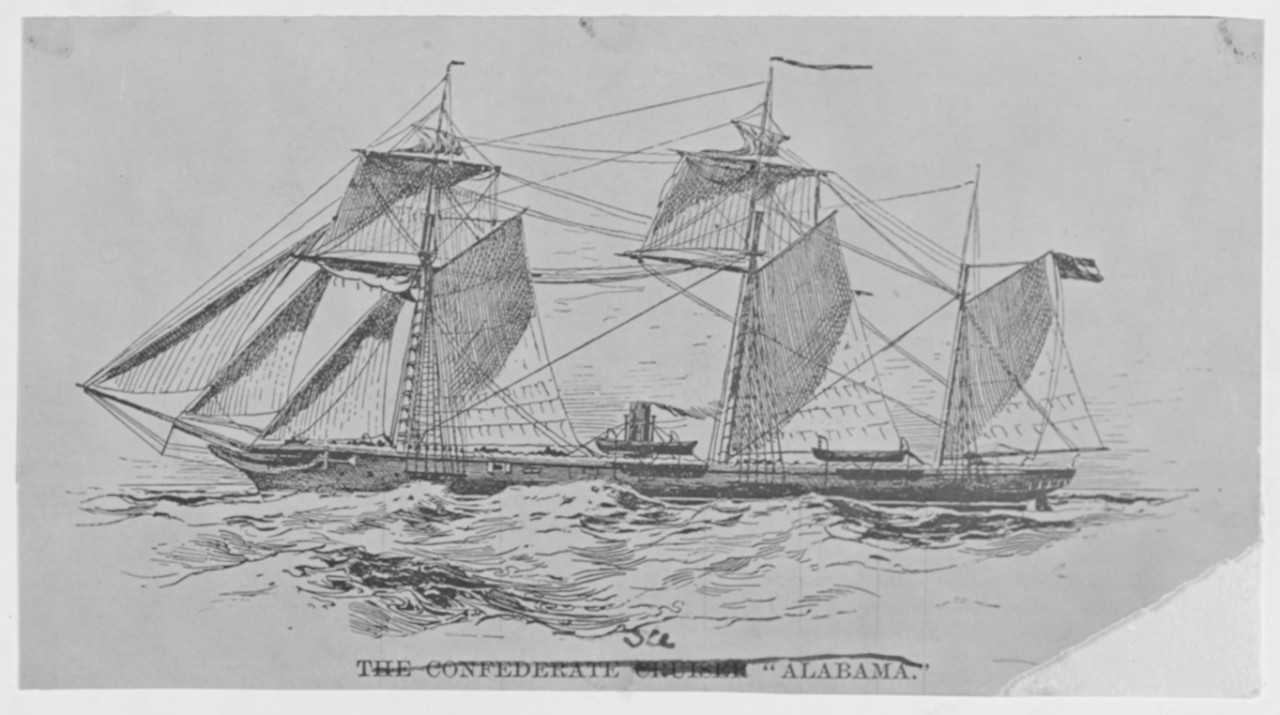
CSS Alabama This sketch was made from a photograph (of a drawing) which Captain Semmes gave to a friend, with the remark that it was a correct picture of his ship. (Battles and Leaders of the Civil War Vol 4 p.601

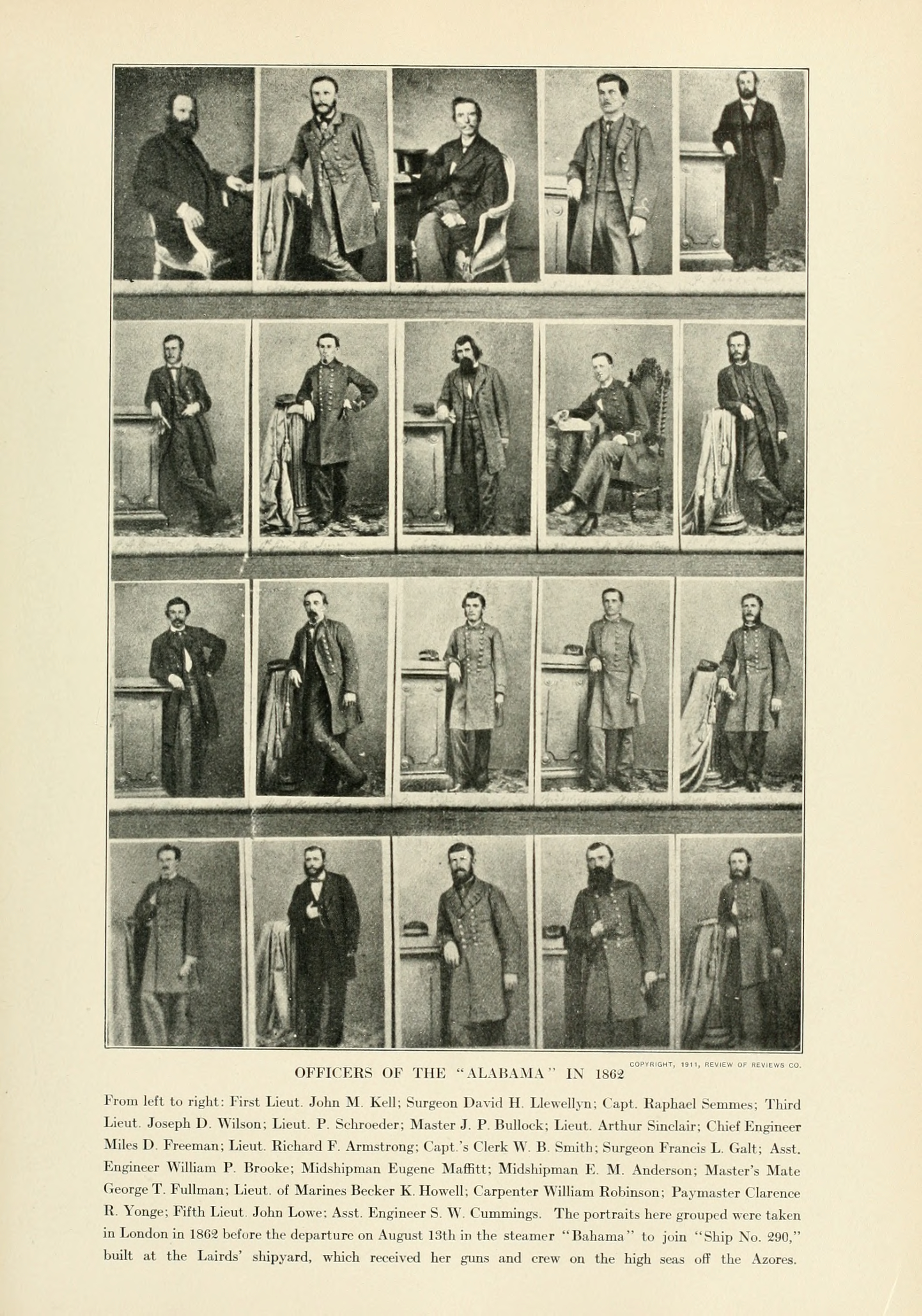
Officers of the CSS Alabama

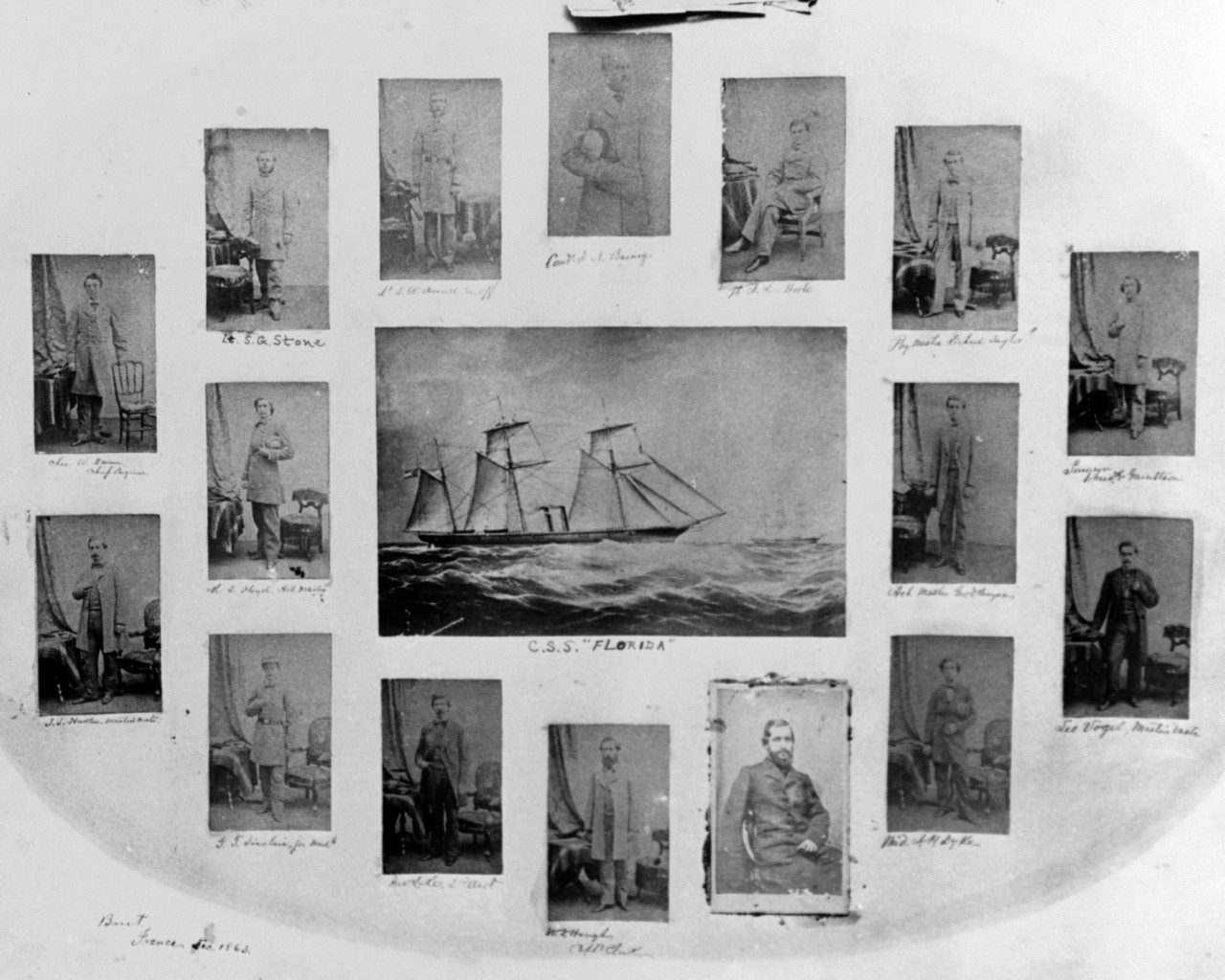
Officers of the CSS Florida

CS Navy wooden floating batteries were towed into firing positions, and as in the case at Charleston Harbor, used for makeshift defense.

- CSS Danube, floating battery
- CSS Memphis, floating battery
- CSS New Orleans, floating battery, scuttled: April 7, 1862
- Floating Battery of Charleston Harbor

=== Cruisers ===
CS Navy cruisers were ocean-going ships designed primarily for the Confederate Navy's strategy of guerre de course. Confederate States Navy cruisers were typically lightly armed, with a couple of large guns or a pivot gun, and often very fast. The Navy planned to add ironclad cruisers to their fleet, successfully procuring one, but too late to be of benefit for the war.

==== Wooden cruisers ====
- CSS Alabama, screw steamer, sloop-of-war, built in Birkenhead, England by John Laird Sons and Company, sunk: June 19, 1864
- CSS Alexandra, screw steamer, bark-rigged, built in Liverpool, England, seized before delivery: April 5, 1863
- CSS America, racing yacht, scuttled: 1862
- CSS Archer, schooner, captured: June 28, 1863
- CSS Caleb Cushing, revenue cutter, burned: June 28, 1863
- CSS Chickamauga, screw steamer, burned
- CSS Clarence, brig, burned: June 12, 1863
- CSS Florida, screw steamer, sloop, captured: October 7, 1864
- CSS Georgia, screw steamer, iron, sold: June 1, 1864
- CSS Georgiana, steamer, destroyed: After leaving port on March 20, 1863, the steamer is destroyed on March 22, 1863
- CSS Lapwing, bark, burned: June 20, 1863
- CSS Nashville, side-wheel steamer, brig rigged, sold and used as privateer Rattlesnake and sunk, February 28, 1862
- CSS Rappahannock, screw steamer, sloop-of-war, turned over at war's end
- CSS Shenandoah, screw steamer, full rigged, iron-framed, turned over to British Government
- CSS Sumter, screw steamer, sloop, sold: December 19, 1862
- CSS Tacony, bark, burned: June 25, 1863
- CSS Tallahassee, twin-screw steamer, sloop, seized: April 9, 1865 by British Government
- CSS Tuscaloosa, bark, seized: December 29, 1863
- CSS United States, frigate, sail, harbor defense use only, scuttled

==== Ironclad cruisers ====
But the CS Navy attempts to procure ironclad cruisers from overseas were frustrated as European nations confiscated ships being built for the Confederacy. Only the Stonewall was completed and successfully delivered, and she arrived in American waters just in time for the end of the war.

- CSS North Carolina I, seized October 1863 and commissioned as HMS Scorpion
- CSS Mississippi II, seized October 1863 and commissioned as HMS Wivern
- CSS Stonewall, twin-screw steamer, brig rigged, ironclad, surrendered in Cuba at end of war, returned to US, sold to Japan and renamed Kōtetsu
- CSS Cheops, sister to Stonewall, built in France and sold to Prussia, October 29, 1865, and named SMS Prinz Adalbert
- CSS Georgia screw corvette 2017 tons [1,150 tons BOM]. Sold to Peru after the French government stopped its sale to the Confederacy. Taken into service as BAP Unión 1864. Scuttled January 1881 to avoid capture.
- CSS Texas, screw corvette and sister ship of BAP Union. Sold to Peru after the French government stopped its sale to the Confederacy. Taken into service as BAP America. Lost during the Arica tsunami on 13 August 1868.
- Ironclad Frigate No. 61, arranged by Captain James H. North, CSN, sold to Denmark, commissioned as Danmark
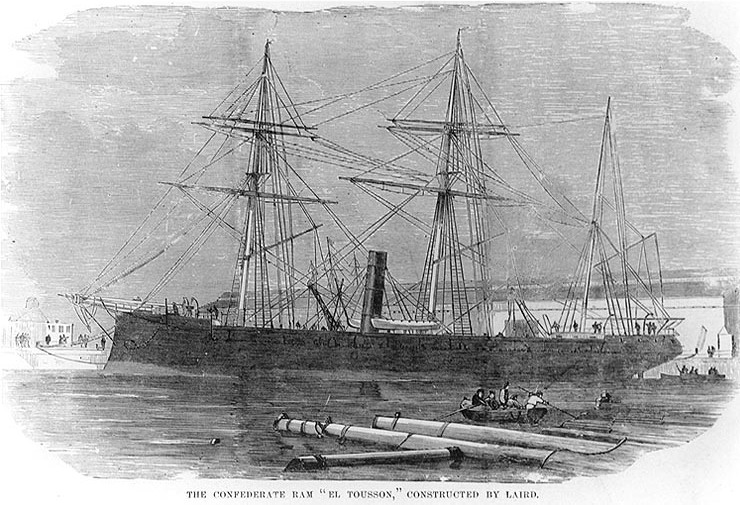
CSS Scorpion/HMS Scorpion 1863

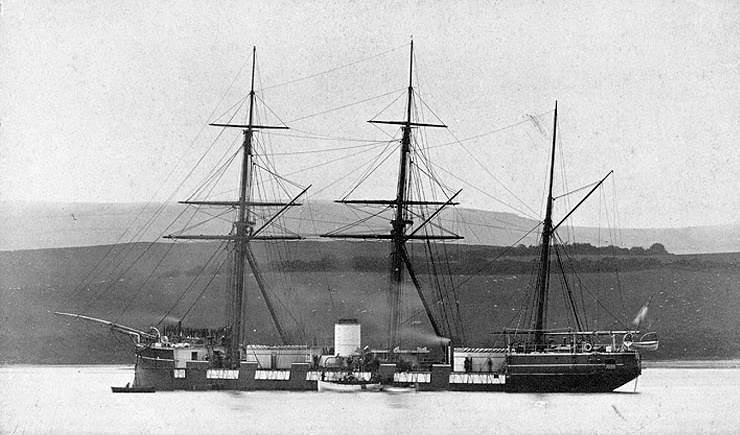
CSS Mississippi/HMS Wivern 1865

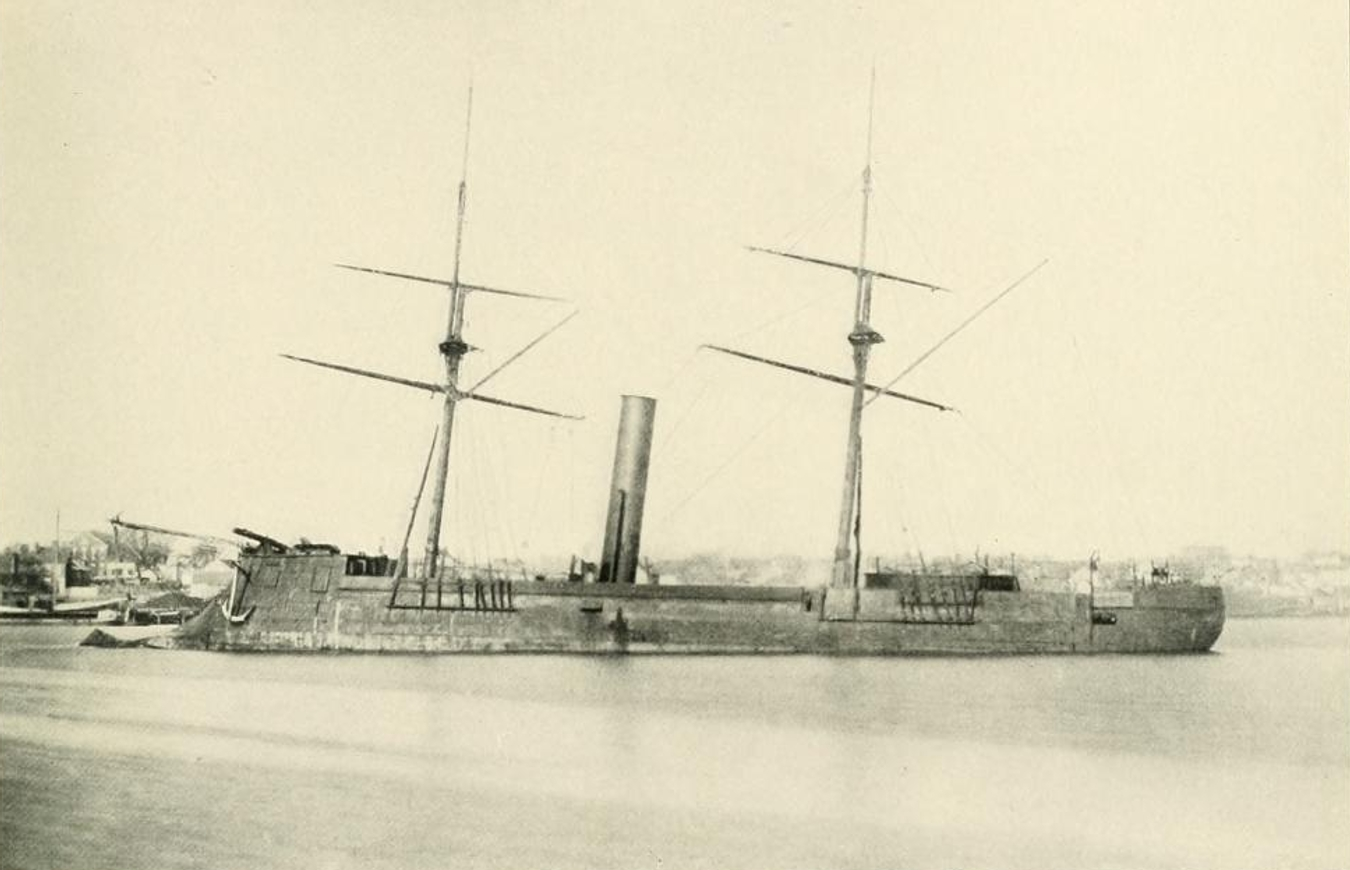
CSS Stonewall/Kōtetsu 1865

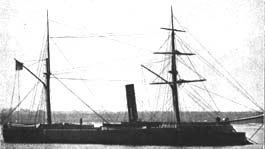
CSS Cheops/SMS Prinz Adalbert 1865

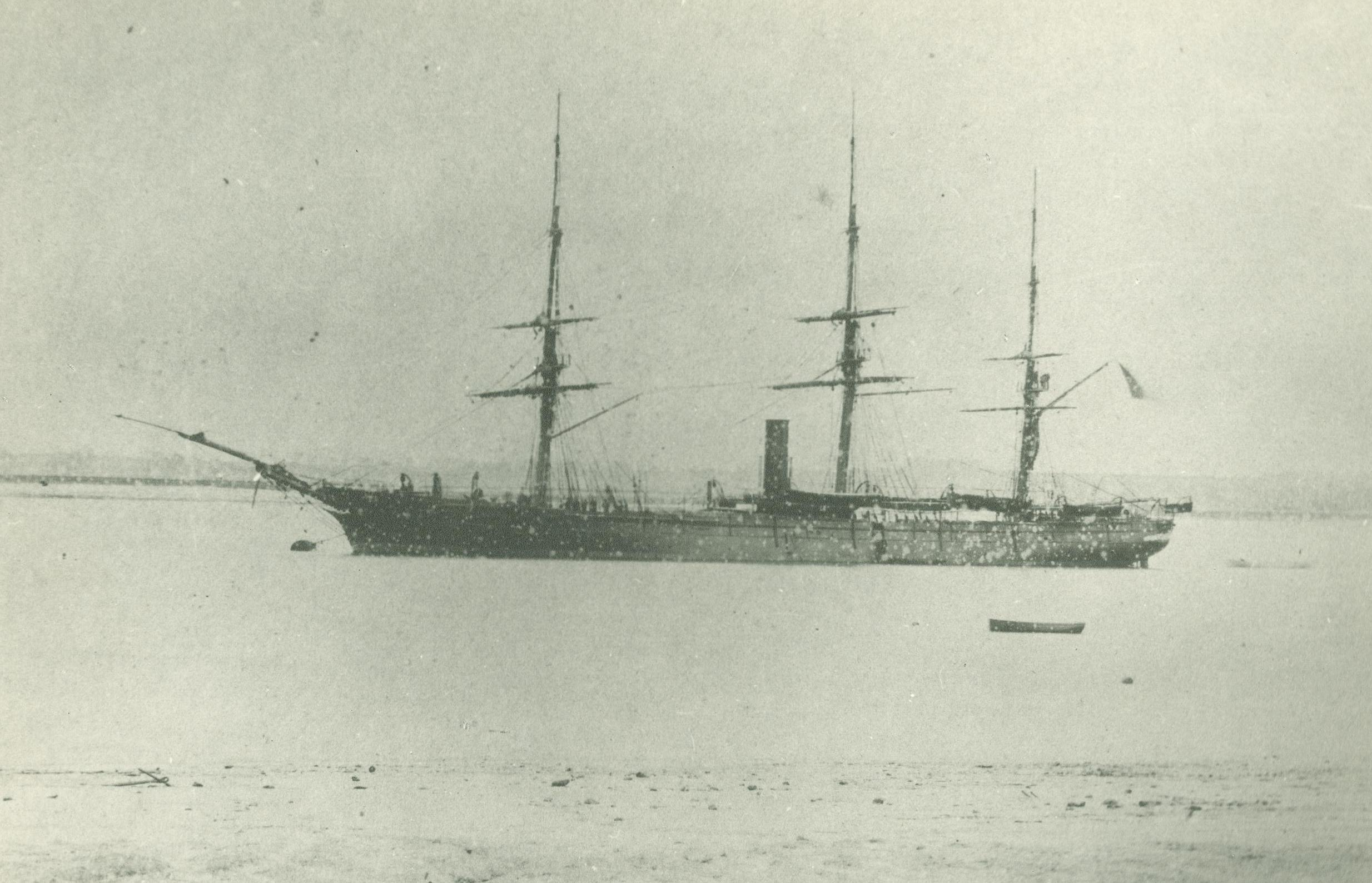
CSS Georgia/BAP Unión 1880

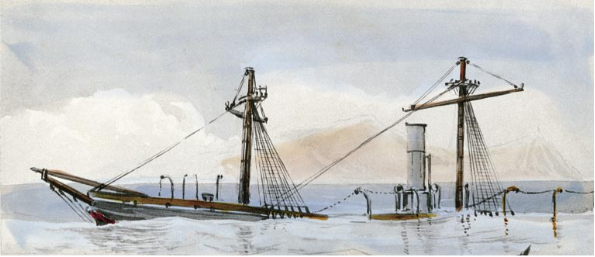
The scuttled BAP Unión 1881

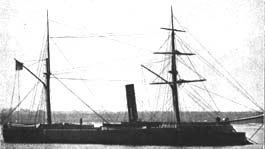
CSS Cheops/SMS Prinz Adalbert 1865

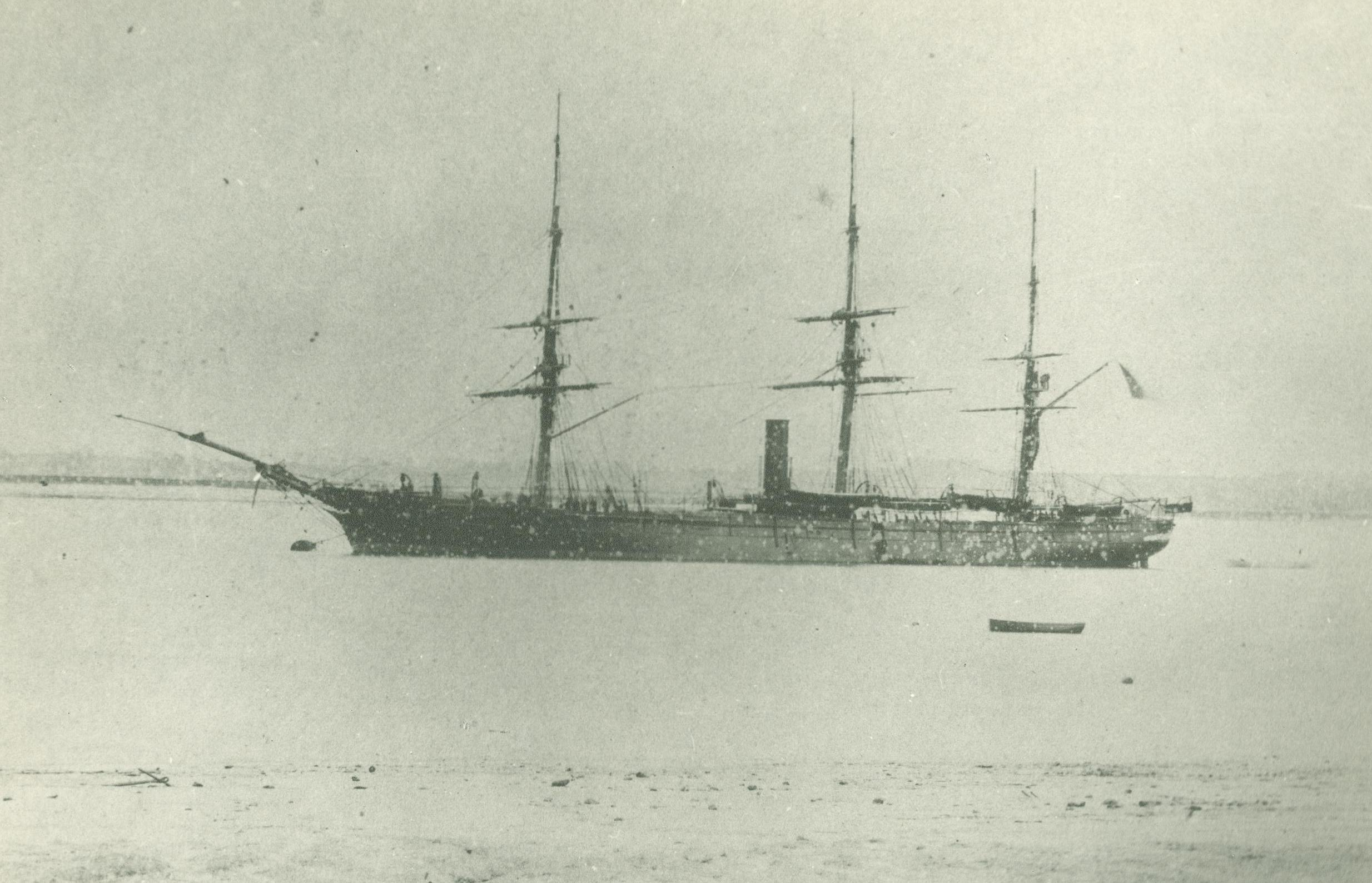
CSS Georgia/BAP Unión 1880

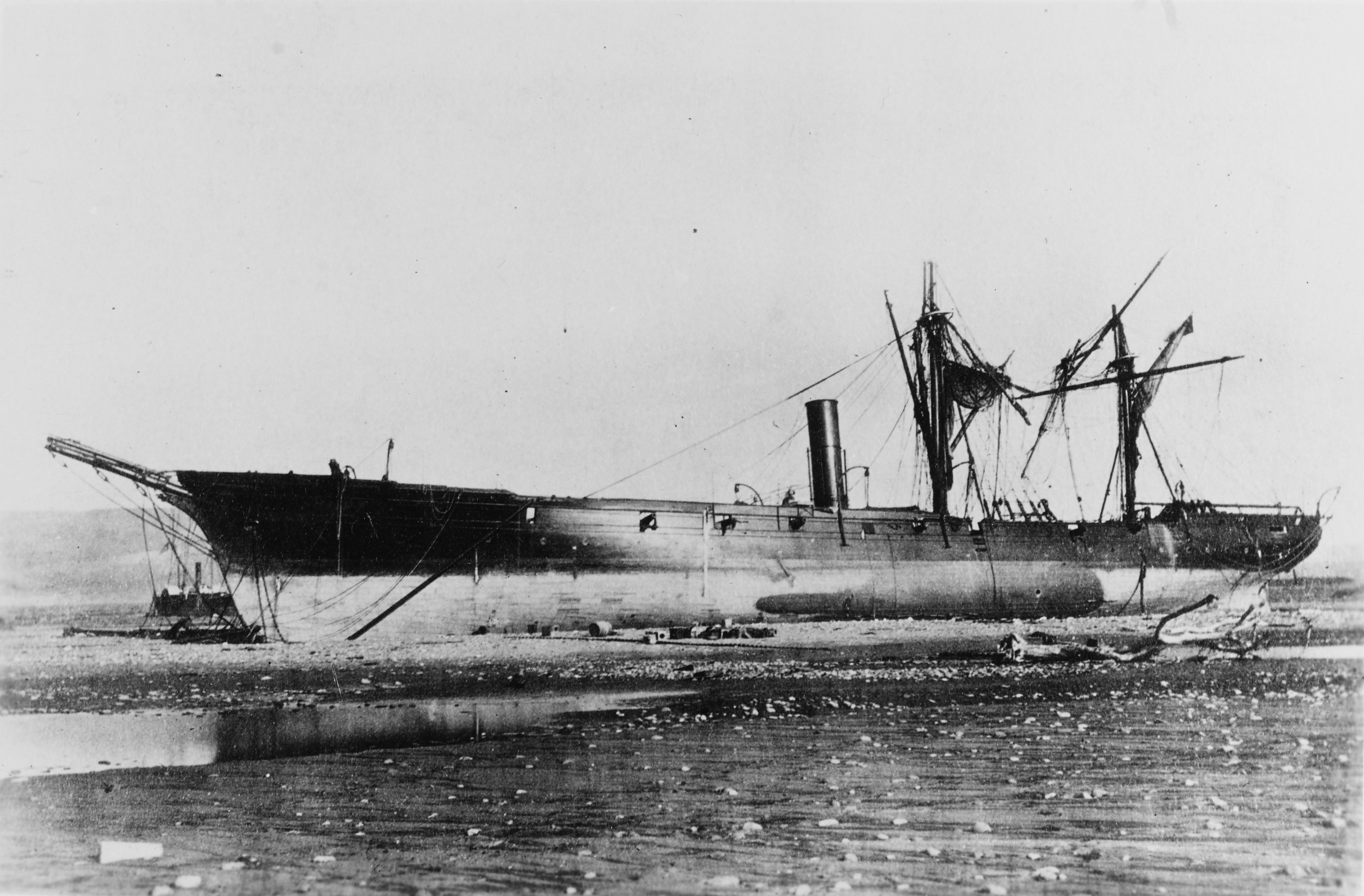
CSS Texas/The BAP corvette America wrecked by the 1868 tsunami at Arica

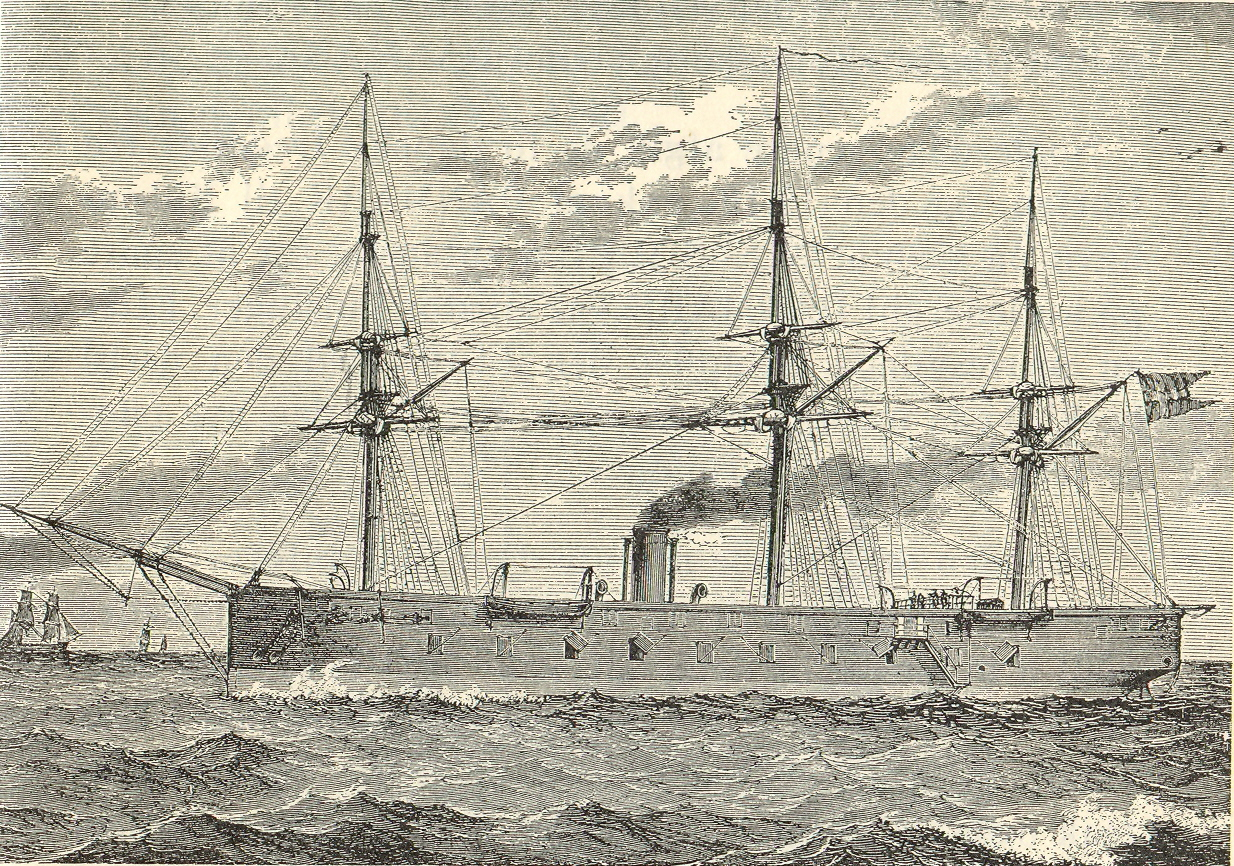
CSS Frigate No 61/KMD Danmark 1864

=== Gunboats ===
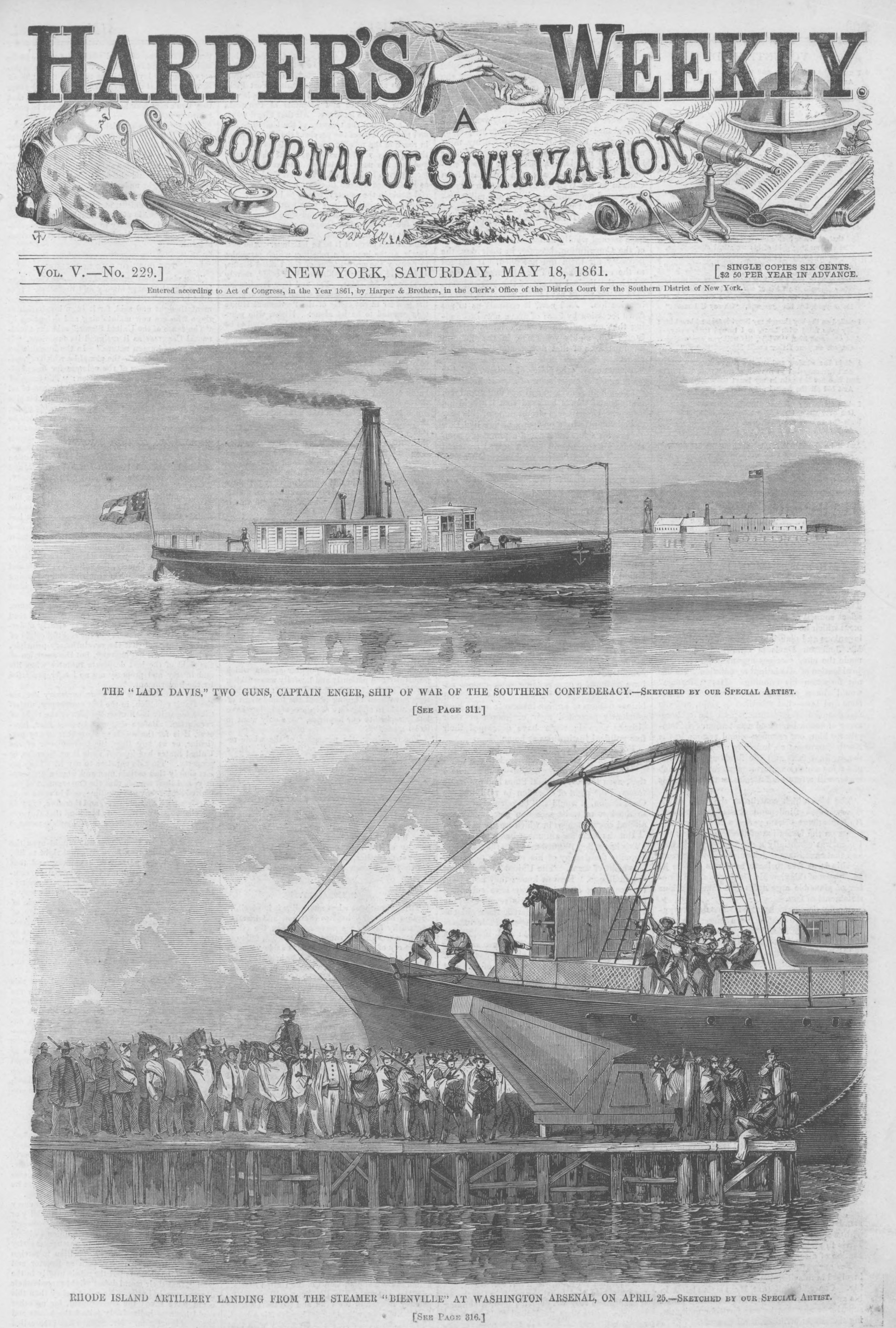
Top picture CSS Lady Davis May 18, 1861

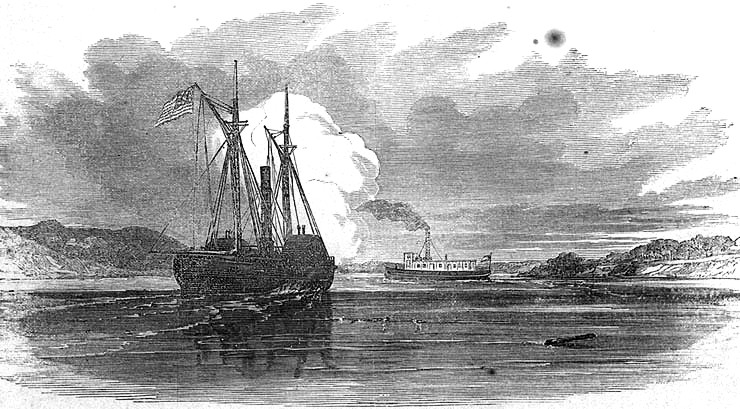
CSS Teaser at the right

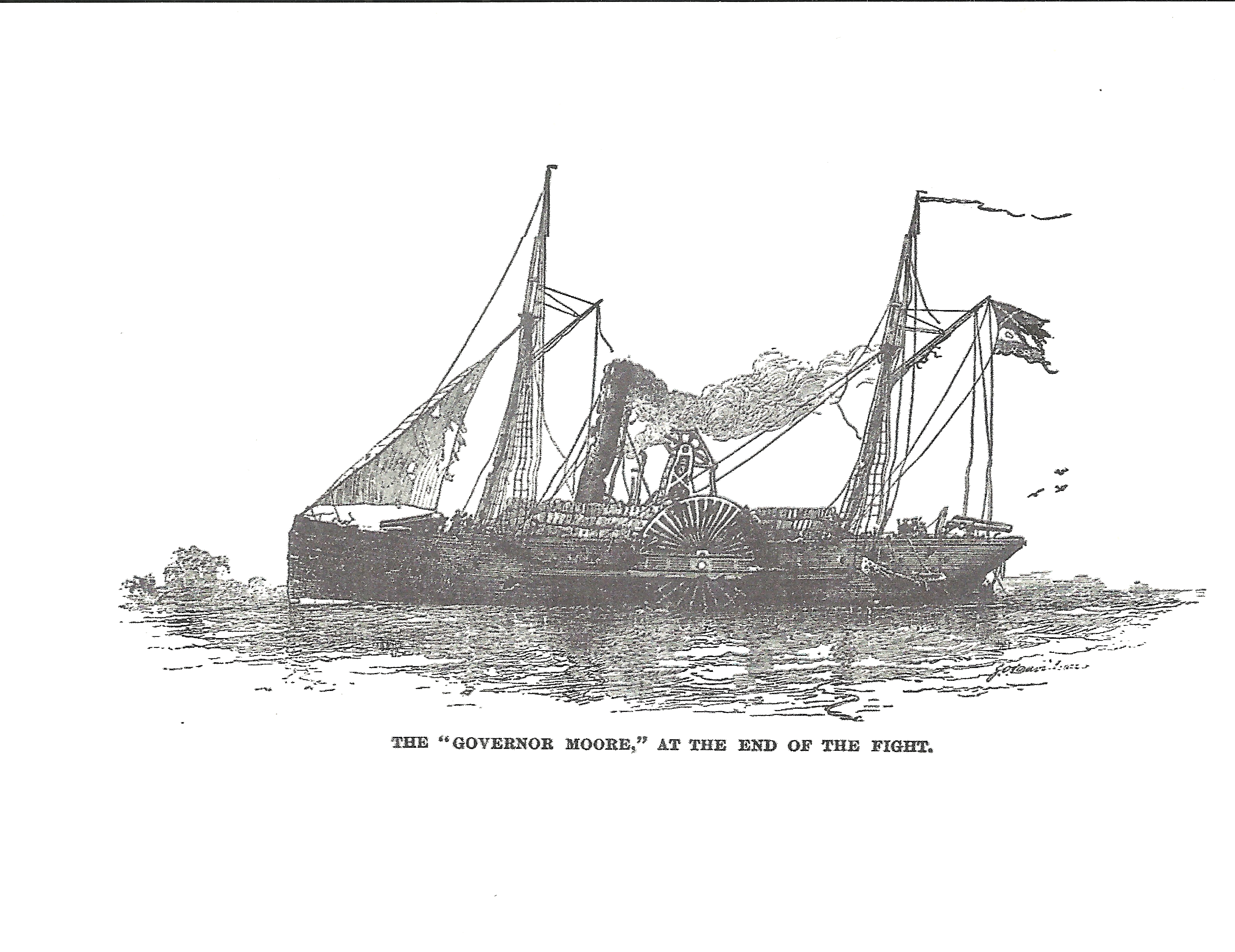
CSS Governor Moore

- CSS A. B. Seger, dispatch boat, run aground 1 November 1862; seized and placed in service by the Union
- CSS Anglo-Norman, side-wheel steamer, burned or captured April 1862
- CSS Appomattox, tugboat, burned February 10, 1862
- CSS Bartow, schooner
- CS Bayou City, surrendered to U.S. Navy 1865; sold 1866
- CSS Beaufort, screw steamer, captured by U.S. Navy April 3, 1865
- CSS Bienville, side-wheel steamer, destroyed incomplete April 1862
- CSS Black Warrior, schooner, burned February 10, 1862
- CSS Bombshell, steamer, captured: May 5, 1864
- CSS Calhoun, sidewheel gunboat, captured: January 23, 1862
- CSS Carondelet, sidewheel steamer, destroyed April 1862
- CSS Chattahoochee, twin-screw steamer, scuttled: December, 1864
- CSS Clifton, side-wheel gunboat, Texas Marine Department, scuttled March 1864
- CSS Curlew, side-wheel river steamer, sunk: February 7, 1862
- CSS De Soto, side-wheel steamer, captured: September 30, 1862
- CSS Defiance, river steamer, destroyed: April 28, 1862
- CSS Diana, steamer, which twice changed hands, managed to survive the Civil War and was presumably decommissioned
- CSS Drewry, steamer, tender, destroyed: January 24, 1865
- CSS Ellis, steamer, tugboat, captured: February 10, 1862
- CSS Equator, steamer, burned: 1865
- CSS Fanny, screw steamer, iron hull, burned: February 10, 1862
- CSS Fashion, schooner
- CSS Forrest, steamer, tugboat, burned: February 10, 1862
- CSS Fulton
- CSS Gaines, side-wheel steamer
- CSS General Quitman, steamer, destroyed: April 24, 1862
- CSS General Polk, steamer, destroyed: June 26, 1862
- CSS George Page, side-wheel river steamer, burned
- CSS Germantown sloop-of-war, sunk as blockship May 10, 1862
- CSS Governor Moore, side-wheel steamer, schooner rigged, destroyed: April 23, 1862. Also listed as a Cotton Clad ram (see below) since she had cotton as part of her armor.
- CSS Hampton, screw steamer, burned: April 4, 1865
- CSS Harmony, steamer, tug
- CSS Helen, side-wheel steamer; Charleston harbor gunboat: sank March 10, 1864
- CSS Henry Dodge, cutter, schooner rigged
- CSS Huntress, side-wheel steamer
- CSS Isondiga, steamer, burned: December 21, 1864
- CSS Ivy, side-wheel river steamer, burned: 1863
- CSS J. A. Cotton, a side-wheel river steamer, burned: January 14, 1863 (See Bayou Teche and USS Kinsman). Sometimes called an ironclad since she had a small amount of railroad iron tacked onto her side.
- CSS Jackson, side-wheel river steamer, tug, sunk
- CSS Jamestown, side-wheel steamer, sunk: May, 1862
- CSS Junaluska, steamer, tug, dismantled: 1862
- CSS Kate Bruce, schooner, scuttled
- CSS Lady Davis, steamer tug, iron, machinery mounted in CSS Palmetto
- CSS Launch No. 3, steamer, captured: April, 1862
- CSS Launch No. 2, steamer, destroyed: April 24, 1862
- CSS Livingston, side-wheel steamer, destroyed: June 26, 1862
- CSS Macon, steamer
- CSS Matilda, bark
- CSS Maurepas, side-wheel steamer, sunk: June, 1862
- CSS McRae, screw steamer, sloop rigged, sunk: April 28, 1862
- CSS Morgan, side-wheel steamer, surrender: 1865
- CSS Morgan, cutter
- CSS Morning Light, sail, burned: January 23, 1863
- CSS Nansemond, twin-screw gunboat, burned: April 3, 1865
- CS Neptune, steamer, sunk: January 1, 1863
- CSS Nina, steamer
- CSS Oregon, steamer, scuttled: Apr, 1862
- CSS Pamlico, side-wheel river steamer, burned: 1862
- CSS Patrick Henry, side-wheel steamer, CSNA school ship, burned: April 4, 1865
- CSS Pedee, screw steamer, sunk: 1865
- CSS Plymouth, sloop-of-war, burned: 1862
- CSS Pontchartrain, side-wheel river steamer, burned: 1863
- CSS Raleigh, steamer
- CSS Rappahannock, formerly St. Nicholas until seized and purchased in 1861, side-wheel steamer, burned: April, 1862 (Not to be confused with the steam sloop of war of the same name.)
- CSS Rescue, cutter, schooner rigged
- CSS Resolute, burned: April 24, 1862
- CSS Roanoke, screw steamer, destroyed: April 4, 1865
- CSS Queen of the West
- CSS Sampson, side-wheel river steamer
- CSS Savannah, steamer, foundered: August 18, 1863
- CSS Schultz, formerly A.H. Schultz, until seized and purchased in 1861, side-wheel steamer, used as a flag of truce vessel, sunk: February 17, 1865
- CSS Sea Bird, side-wheel river steamer, sunk: February 10, 1862
- CSS Selma, side-wheel river steamer, captured: August 5, 1864
- CSS Spray, steam tug, sunk
- CSS St. Mary, side-wheel river steamer, burned
- CSS Stono, burned: 1865
- CSS Talomico, side-wheel steamer, sunk: 1863
- CSS Teaser, tug, captured: 1862
- CSS Tiger
- CSS Torpedo, screw steamer, tug/tender, iron, burned: April 4, 1865
- CSS Tropic
- CSS Tuscarora, side-wheel steamer, burned
- CSS Velocity schooner, captured from the Union,
- CSS Washington schooner, Previously USRC Washington, scuttled April 25, 1862
- CSS Water Witch, side-wheel steamer, burned: December 19, 1864
- CSS Winslow, side-wheel river steamer, wrecked
- CSS Yadkin, steamer, burned: 1865

=== Torpedo boats ===
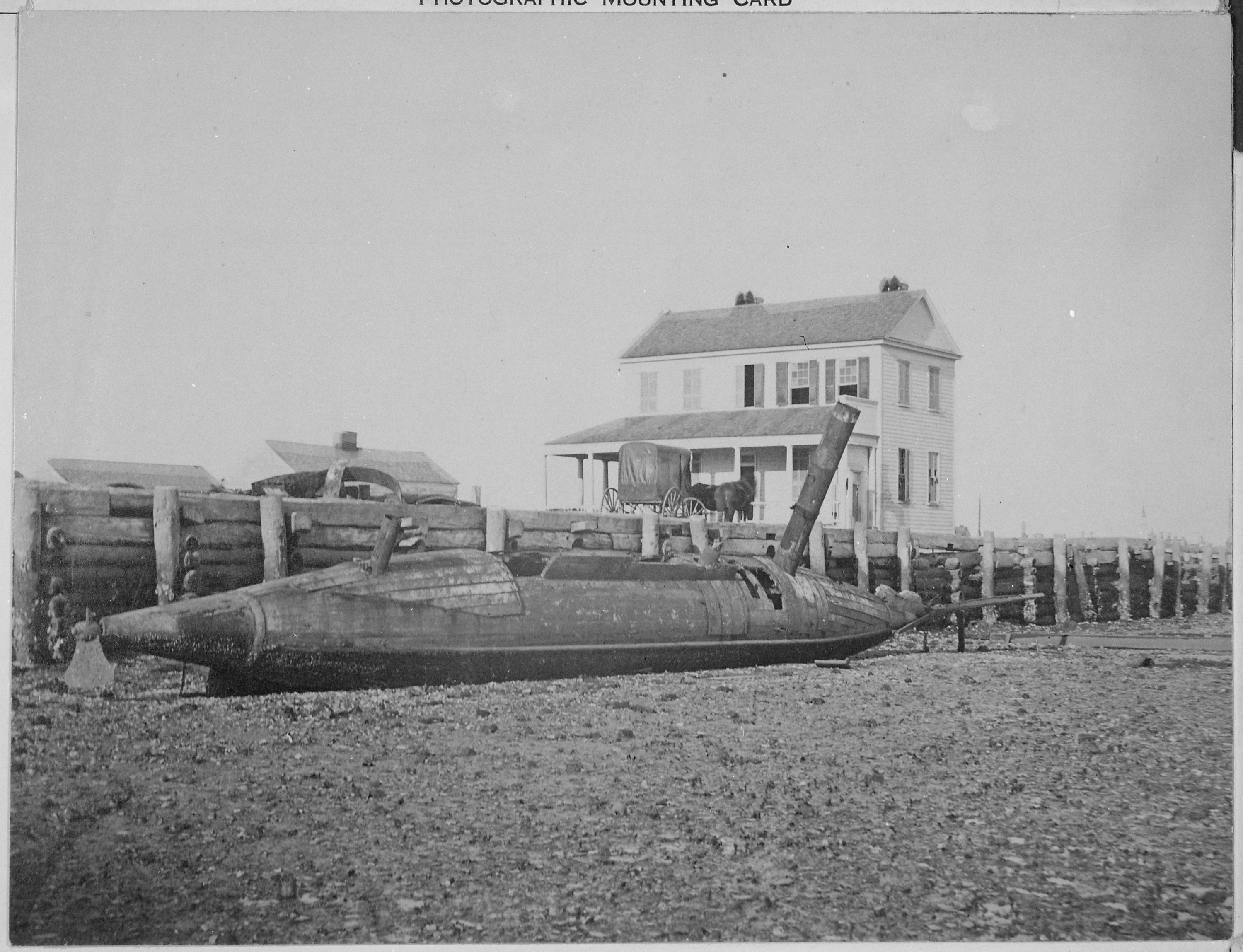
Photograph of a captured David class torpedo boat (possibly CSS David herself), taken after the fall of Charleston in 1865

- CSS David, semi-submersible torpedo boat
- CSS David, larger version of David, captured incomplete: February, 1865
- CSS Gunnison, screw steam spar torpedo boat
- CSS Hornet, spar torpedo boat
- CSS Juno, steam torpedo boat
- CSS Midge, steam torpedo boat, captured: February, 1865
- CSS Scorpion, spar torpedo boat
- CSS Squib, spar torpedo boat
- CSS Squire
- CSS St. Patrick, semi-submersible torpedo boat or submarine
- CSS Torch, screw steamer spar torpedo boat
- CSS Wasp, spar torpedo boat

== CSN support ships ==
=== Government blockade runners ===
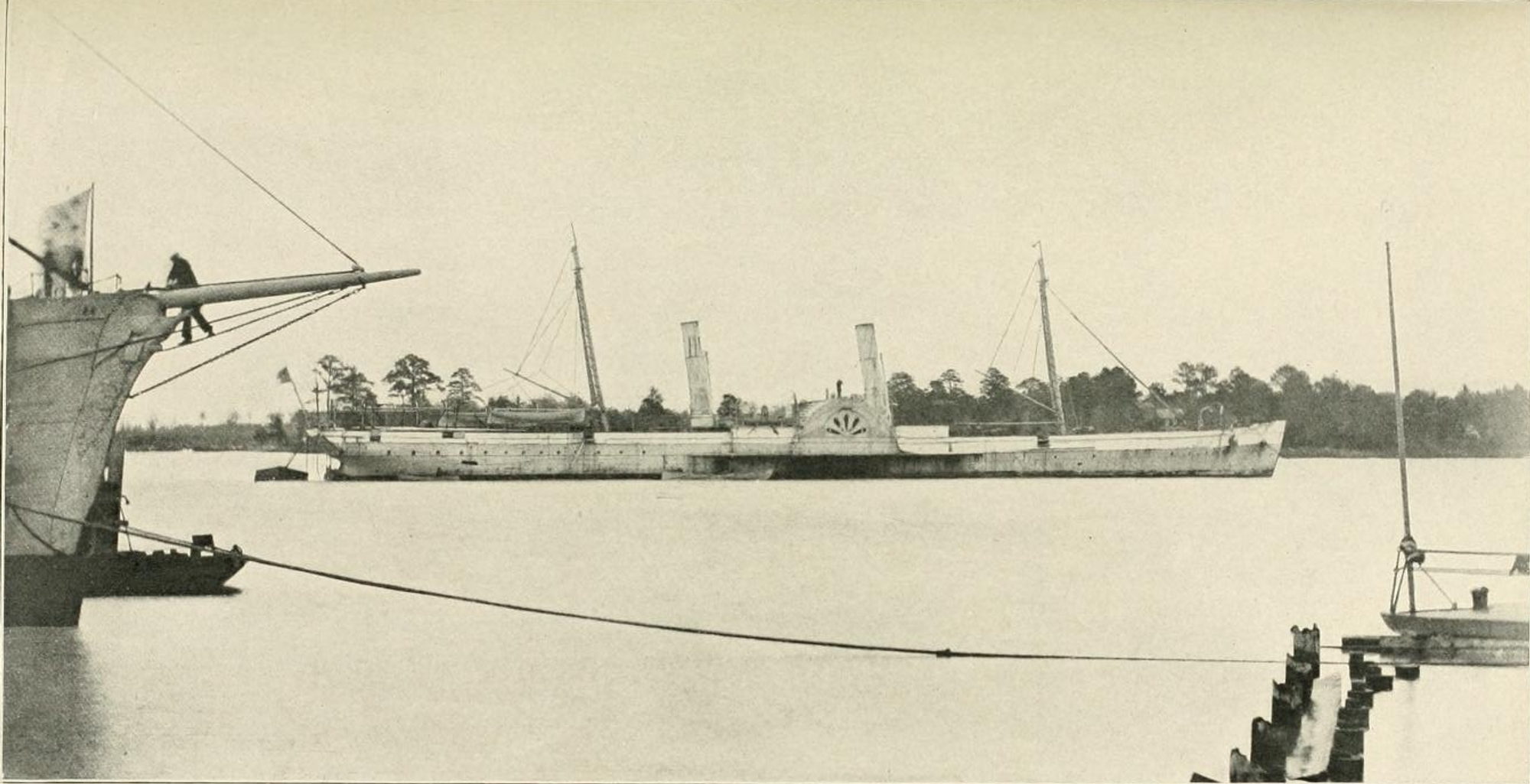
CSS Robert E Lee

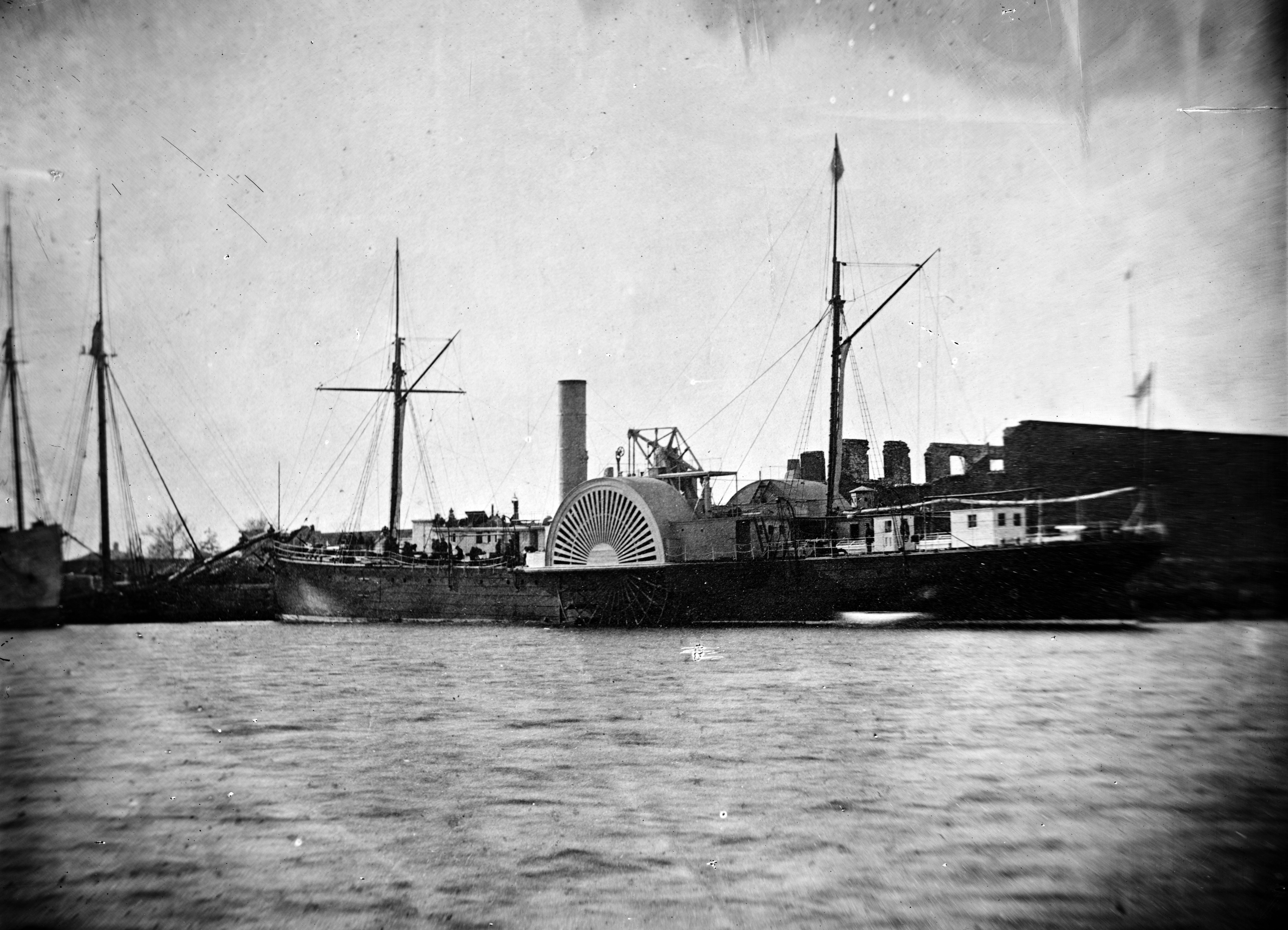
CSS William G Hewes later USS Malvern

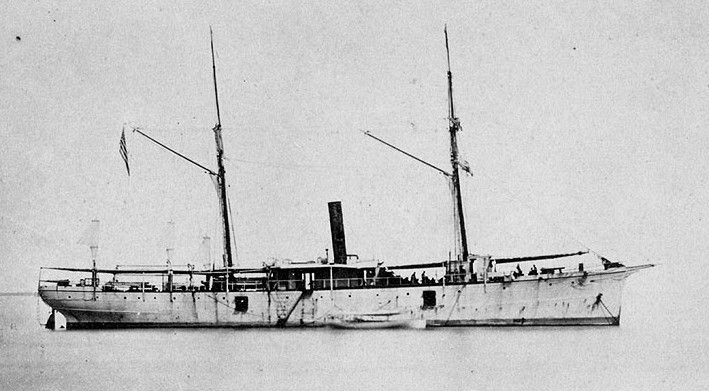
CSS Florida renamed USS Henderick Hudson

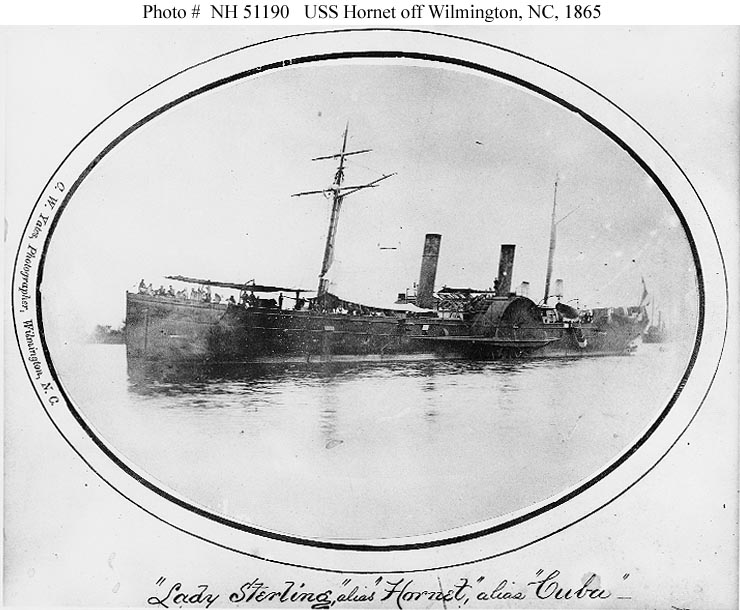
CSS Lady Sterling renamed USS Hornet

- CSS Advance, side-wheel steamer, captured: September 10, 1864
- CSS Florida, screw steamer
- CSS Harriet Lane, side-wheel steamer, captured
- CSS Kate Dale
- CSS Lady Stirling, side-wheel steamer, captured: October 28, 1864
- CSS Owl
- CSS Rob Roy
- CSS Robert E. Lee
- CSS William G. Hewes, (later SS Ella and Annie), captured: November 9, 1863
- CSS Enterprise
- CSS General Whiting, side-wheel steamer

=== Government steamers ===
- CSS Admiral, side-wheel river steamer, captured: April 7, 1862
- CSS Appomattox, screw steamer, burned: February 10, 1862
- CSS Beaufort
- CSS Beauregard, side-wheel coastal steamer, captured: December, 1864
- CSS Capitol, side-wheel river steamer burned: June 28, 1862
- CSS Champion, side-wheel river steamer, captured: April 7, 1862
- CSS Curlew
- CSS Ellis
- CSS Fanny
- CSS George Page
- CSS Governor Moore
- CSS Grampus, stern-wheel river steamer, scuttled: April 7, 1862
- CSS Grand Duke
- CSS Ida, side-wheel coastal steamer, captured/burned: December 10, 1864
- CSS Jamestown
- CSS Nashville, 1861
- CSS Ohio Belle, side-wheel river steamer, captured: April 7, 1862
- CSS Patrick Henry
- CSS Prince, side-wheel river steamer, sunk: April 7, 1862
- CSS Raleigh, 1861
- CSS Red Rover, side-wheel river steamer, captured: April 7, 1862
- CSS Tennessee, side-wheel steamer, captured: January, 1862
- CSS Winchester, side-wheel river steamer, captured: April 7, 1862

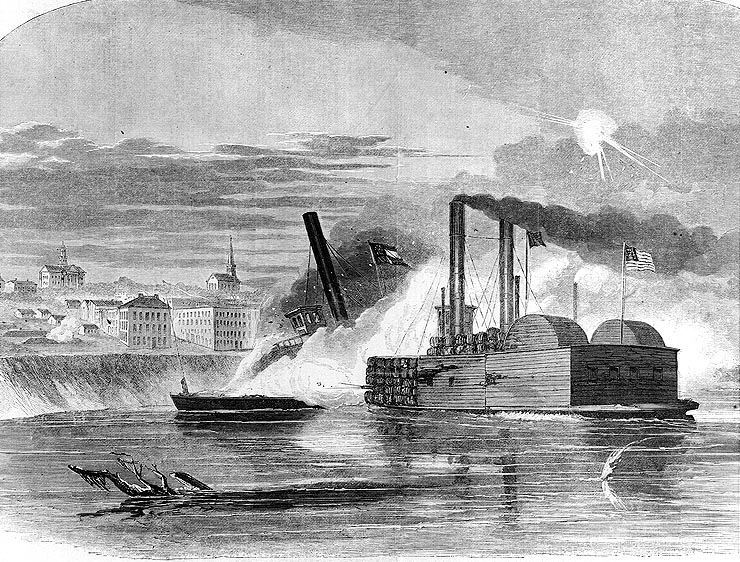
Federal ram USS Queen of the West attacks CSS City of Vicksburg.

=== Government transports ===
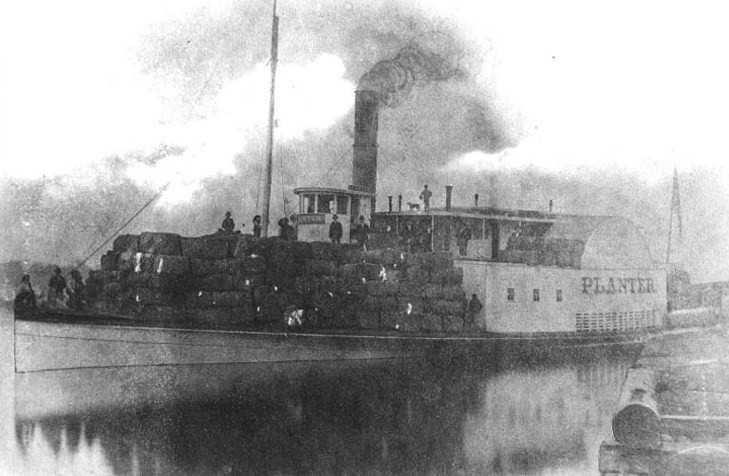
CSS Planter

- CSS Bombshell
- CSS Cotton Plant
- CSS Darlington
- CSS Mars, side-wheel river steamer, captured: April 7, 1862
- CSS Planter, side-wheel steamer, captured by its slave pilot Robert Smalls, May 13, 1862
- CSS Sumter
- CSS Vicksburg, side-wheel steamer transport, damaged when rammed on February 3, 1863, then destroyed: February/March 1863
- CSS Yazoo, side-wheel river steamer, sunk: April 7, 1862

=== Cutters ===
- CSS Duane, revenue cutter, schooner rigged
- CSS Lewis Cass, revenue cutter, schooner rigged
- CSS Manassas, revenue cutter, schooner rigged, dismantled
- CSS Pickens, revenue cutter, schooner rigged

=== Hospital ships ===
- CSS Kanawha Valley, stern-wheel river steamer, burned: April 7, 1862

=== Tenders and tugs ===
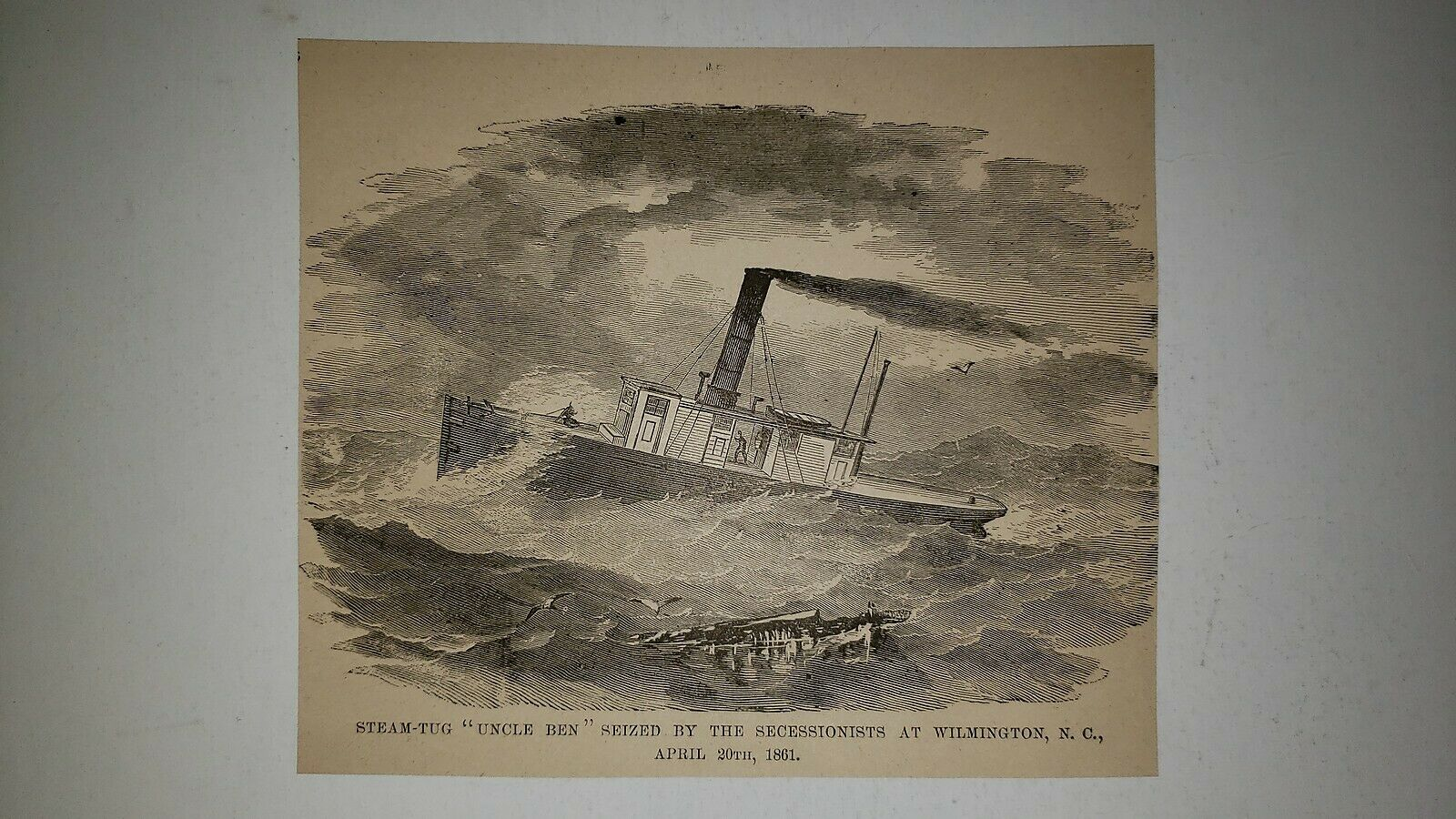
Uncle Ben captured 1861

- CSS Alert, lighthouse tender, schooner rigged
- CSS Beaufort, tugboat
- CSS Caswell, side-wheel steamer tender, burned
- CSS Firefly, side-wheel steamer tender, burned: December 21, 1864
- CSS Indian Chief, receiving ship, burned
- CSS Resolute, side-wheel steamer, tugboat, captured: December 12, 1864
- CSS Retribution, steam tugboat, sold: March 8, 1863
- CSS Satellite, sidewheel steamer, gunboat/tugboat, destroyed: August, 1863
- CSS Shrapnel, tender, burned: April 4, 1865
- CSS St. Philip, receiving ship, sunk
- CSS Uncle Ben, steam tugboat, machinery mounted into CSS North Carolina II (renamed "Retribution" and "Etta")

== Civilian auxiliary ==
=== Privateers ===
- A. C. Gunnison, privateer steam tug
- Beauregard, privateer cutter, schooner rigged, captured: November 12, 1861
- Bonita, 8-gun, 1,110-ton privateer steamer
- Boston, 5-gun privateer steamer operating out of Mobile burned captured barques Lenex and Texana
- Charlotte Clark, 3-gun, 1,110-ton privateer steamer
- Chesapeake, 4-gun, 60-ton privateer schooner
- Dixie, privateer schooner, captured on April 15, 1862, but had itself captured the USA schooner Mary Alice on July 25, 1861, the USA barque Glenn on July 31 of 1861.
- Dove, 8-gun, 1,170-ton privateer steamer
- Gallatin, 150-ton privateer schooner with 2 × 12-pdr
- General N.S. Reneau, privateer steamer
- Gibralter, privateer schooner
- Governor A. Mouton, privateer steamer, captured: May 11, 1862
- Hallie Jackson, privateer brig captured by USS Union
- Isabella, privateer screw steamer
- J. C. Calhoun, privateer side-wheel steamer, which captured the barque Ocean Eagle on May 16, 1861, the ship Milan in May, 1861, the schooner Etta in May, 1861, the brigantine Panama on May 29, 1861, the schooner Mermaid on May 24, 1861, and the schooner John Adams on May 24, 1861, all within its first month of operation in 1861, and which was burned: 1862
- J. M. Chapman, privateer schooner, captured: March 15, 1863
- J. O. Nixon, privateer schooner
- Jefferson Davis, privateer brig, ran aground: mid-August, 1861
- Joseph Landis, 400-ton privateer steamer
- Josephine, privateer schooner
- Judah, privateer schooner, destroyed: September 14, 1861
- Lamar, privateer schooner
- Lorton, privateer schooner
- Mariner, privateer screw steamer, which captured the US schooner Nathaniel Chase on July 25, 1861.
- Mocking Bird, 8-gun, 1,290-ton privateer steamer operating out of New Orleans
- Music, privateer steamer
- Onward, 70-ton privateer schooner with 1 × 32-pdr
- Paul Jones, 2-gun, 160-ton privateer schooner
- Pelican, 10-gun, 1,479-ton privateer steamer
- Petrel, privateer, went to sea on July 1, 1861, and sunk on July 28, 1861, by the Union Navy frigate USS St. Lawrence.
- Phoenix, 7-gun, 1,644-ton privateer steamer
- Sallie, privateer schooner
- Savannah, privateer schooner, captured: June 3, 1861
- Sealine, privateer brig
- Theodora, privateer side-wheel steamer, renamed Gordon, captured the USA brigantine William McGilvery on July 25, 1861, the USA schooner Protector on July 28, 1861
- Triton, 30-ton privateer schooner with 1 × 6-pdr
- V.H. Ivy, privateer steamer
- York, privateer pilot boat, schooner rigged, which was burned on August 9, 1861, after capturing the US brigantine B.T. Martin about July 28, 1861 and the schooner George G. Baker on August 9, 1861, on the day of its demise, whereafter the Union quickly recaptured the George G. Baker.

=== Privateer submersible torpedo boats ===
- H. L. Hunley, hand-cranked, sunk: February 17, 1864. Named in honor of its designer, Confederate marine engineer Horace Lawson Hunley.
- Pioneer
- American Diver, also known as Pioneer II
- Bayou Saint John

=== Civilian steamers ===
- Dick Keys, captured: May 7, 1861
- Lewis, captured: May 7, 1861
- Swan, of Savannah

=== Civilian transports ===
- Berwick Bay, steamer, captured February 3, 1863
- Era No. 5, shallow-draft steamer, captured: February 14, 1863
- Moro, steamer, captured February 3, 1863
- O.W. Baker, steamer, captured February 3, 1863
- White Cloud, steamer, carried provisions on the Mississippi. She was captured on 13 February 1863 near Island No. 10 by USS New Era and was sent as a prize ship to Cairo, Ill. Acquired by the Union Navy, she continued as a goods transport until the end of the war.

=== Civilian blockade runners ===
- Adela, side-wheel steamer
- Agnes E. Fry, paddle steamer
- Alabama, schooner
- Annie, schooner
- Annie Dees, steamer, sloop-rigged
- Ariel, schooner
- Banshee, side-wheel steamer
- Bat, side-wheel steamship, captured: October 10, 1864
- Bermuda, screw steamer
- Caroline, side-wheel steamer (also known as USS Arizona)
- Charlotte, schooner
- Chatham, side-wheel steamer
- Fergus, paddle-steamer
- Colonel Lamb, side-wheel steamer
- Constance Decimer (also known as Constance), side-wheel steamer
- Darlington, side-wheel steamer
- Donegal, side-wheel steamer
- Edith, steamer (Later CSS Chickamauga)
- Ella, side-wheel steamer
- Ella and Annie, side-wheel steamer (captured April 1863)

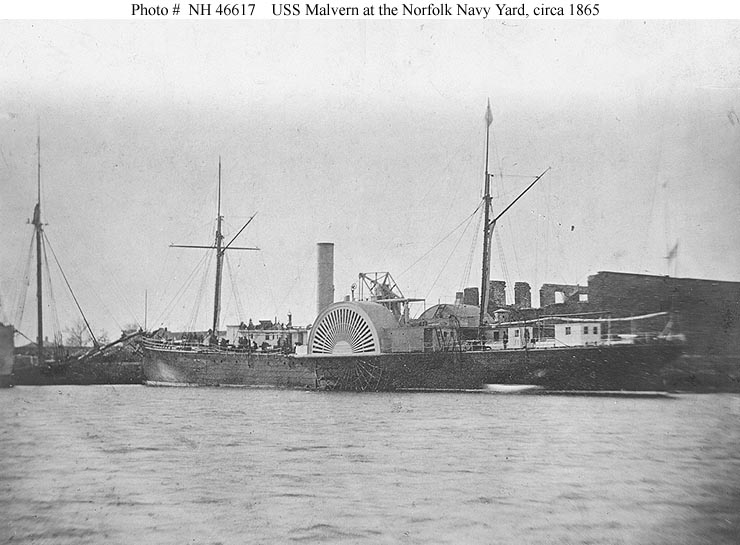
Ella and Annie as USS Malvern

- Emma, screw steamer
- Etiwan, sloop
- Eugenie, side-wheel steamer
- Eugenie Smith, schooner
- Flamingo, side-wheel steamer
- General Banks, paddle steamer (later Fanny and Jenny)
- Gibraltar, screw steamer, bark-rigged
- Granite City, side-wheel steamer
- Lady Davis, steamer
- Lelia, paddle-steamer
- Magnolia, side-wheel steamer
- Mary Bowers, side-wheel steamer
- Memphis, screw steamer (later USS Memphis)
- Monticello, Cuban blockade runner
- Nita, side-wheel steamer
- Norseman
- Old Dominion, paddle steamer
- Preston, steamer
- Rob Roy, schooner
- Rosalie, sloop
- Ruby, side-wheel steamer
- San Quintin, Cuban blockade runner
- Sarah and Caroline, schooner
- Shark, schooner
- Stonewall, schooner
- Stonewall Jackson, (ex-Leopard), side-wheel steamer
- Syren, side-wheel steamer
- Thistle, side-wheel steamer
- Thomas L. Wragg, side-wheel steamer, brig-rigged (later, privateer Rattlesnake)
- Tristram Shandy, side-wheel steamer
- Two Sisters, schooner
- Virginia, screw steamer
- Wando, steamer
- Wild Cat, schooner

=== Foreign blockade runners ===
- Antona, screw steamer
- Britannia, side-wheel steamer
- Don, screw steamer
- Denbigh side-wheel steamer, schooner rigged
- Fingal, steamer
- Gertrude, screw steamer
- Isabel steamer
- J. W. Wilder, schooner
- Julia, sloop
- Lark, side-wheel steamer
- Lodona, screw steamer
- Penquin, side-wheel steamer
- Peterhoff, screw steamer
- Preston, screw steamer
- Prince Albert, side-wheel steamer
- Princess Royal, screw steamer
- Thistle, screw steamer
- Velocity, schooner
- Victory, screw steamer
- Vulture, paddle steamer
- Wren, side-wheel steamer

== CS Army ==
=== CSA cotton-clads ===
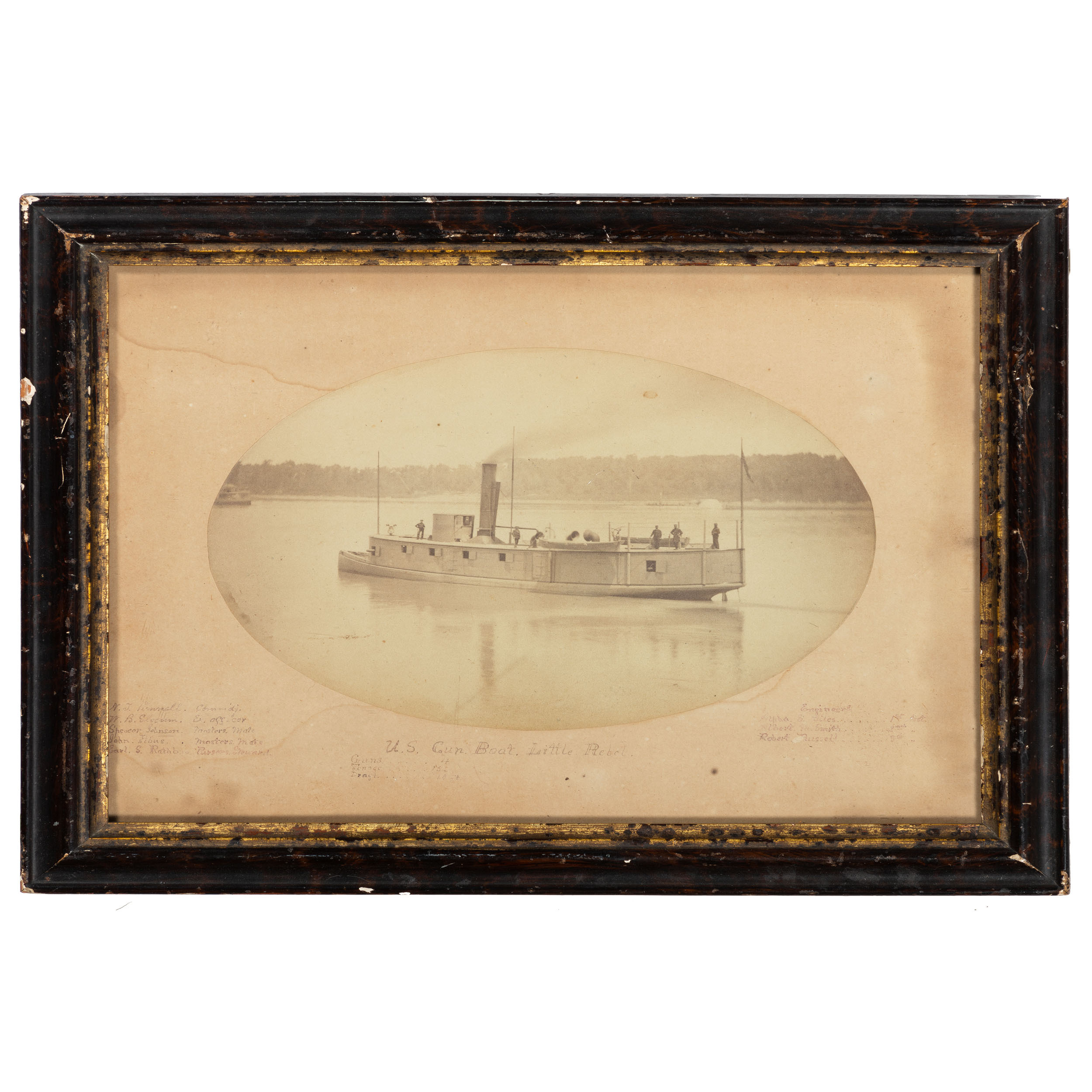
USS (ex-CSS) Little Rebel

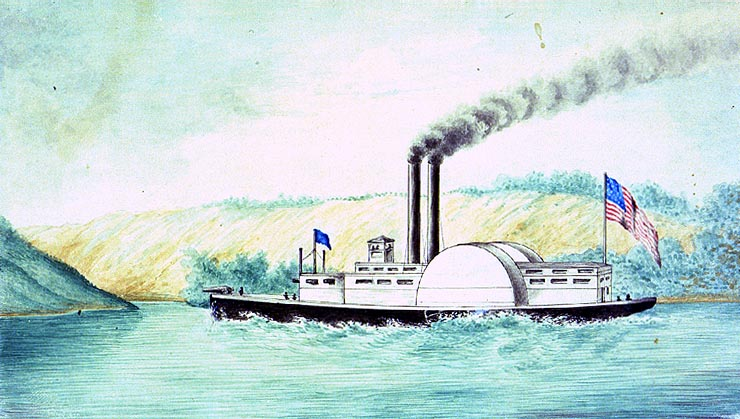
USS {later CSS} Queen of the West

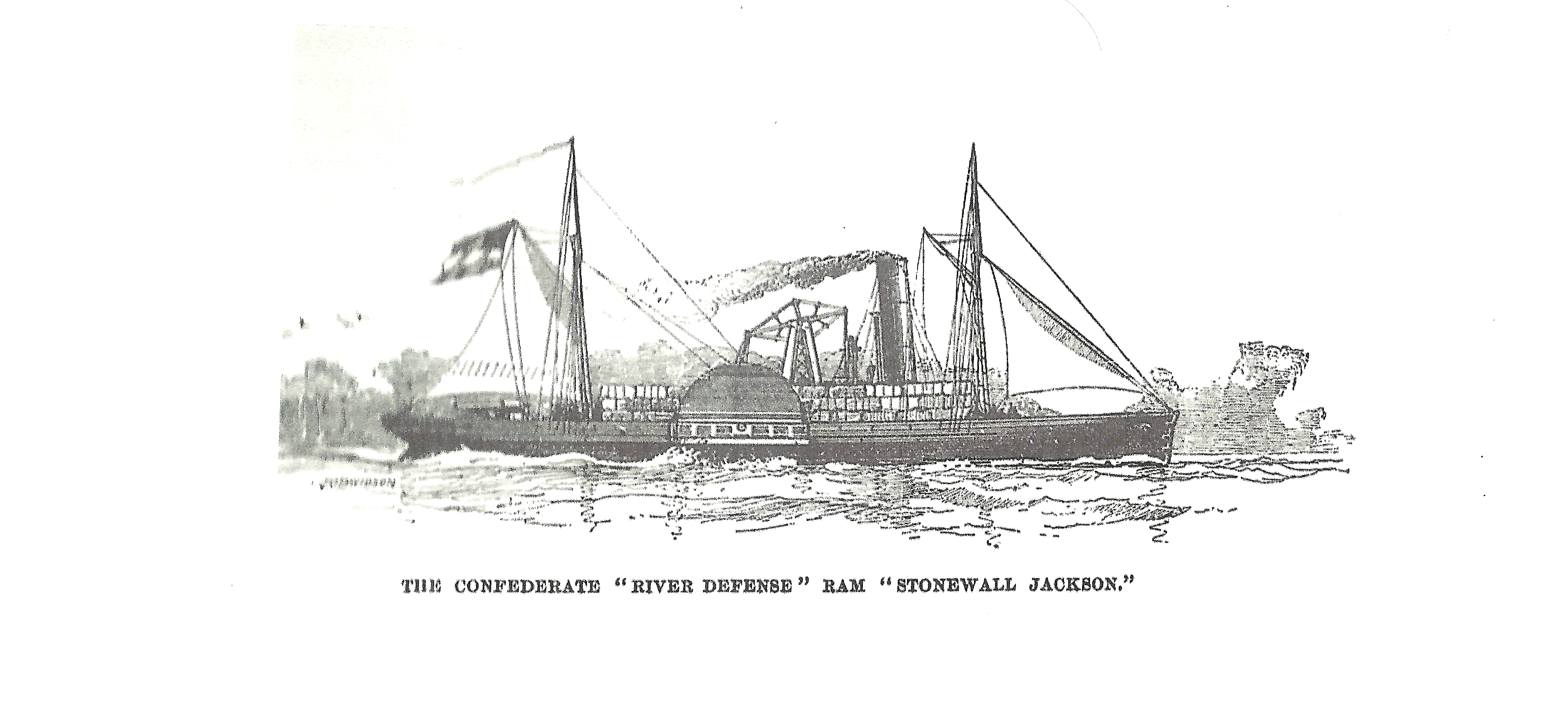
CSS Stonewall Jackson

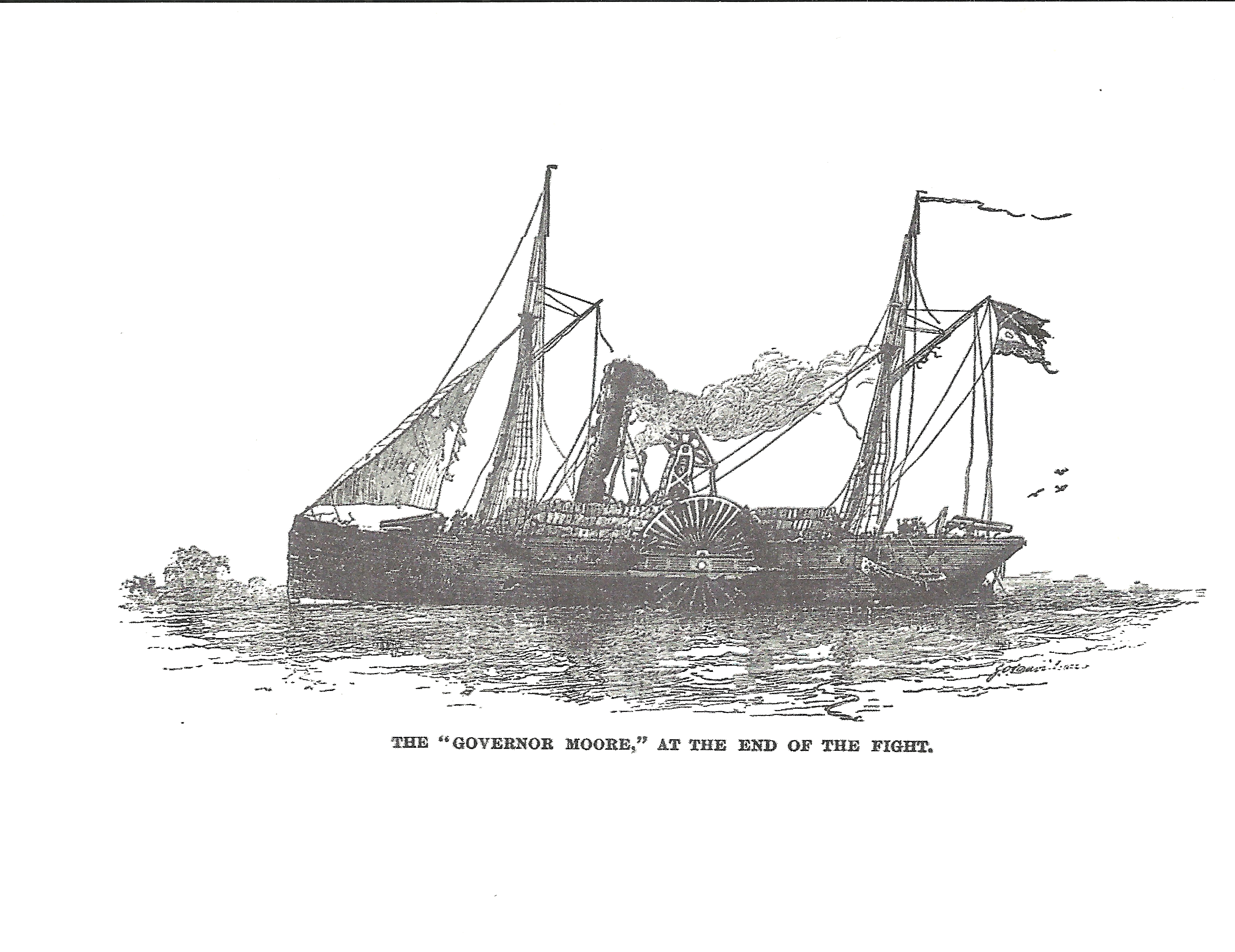
CSS Governor Moore after the fight

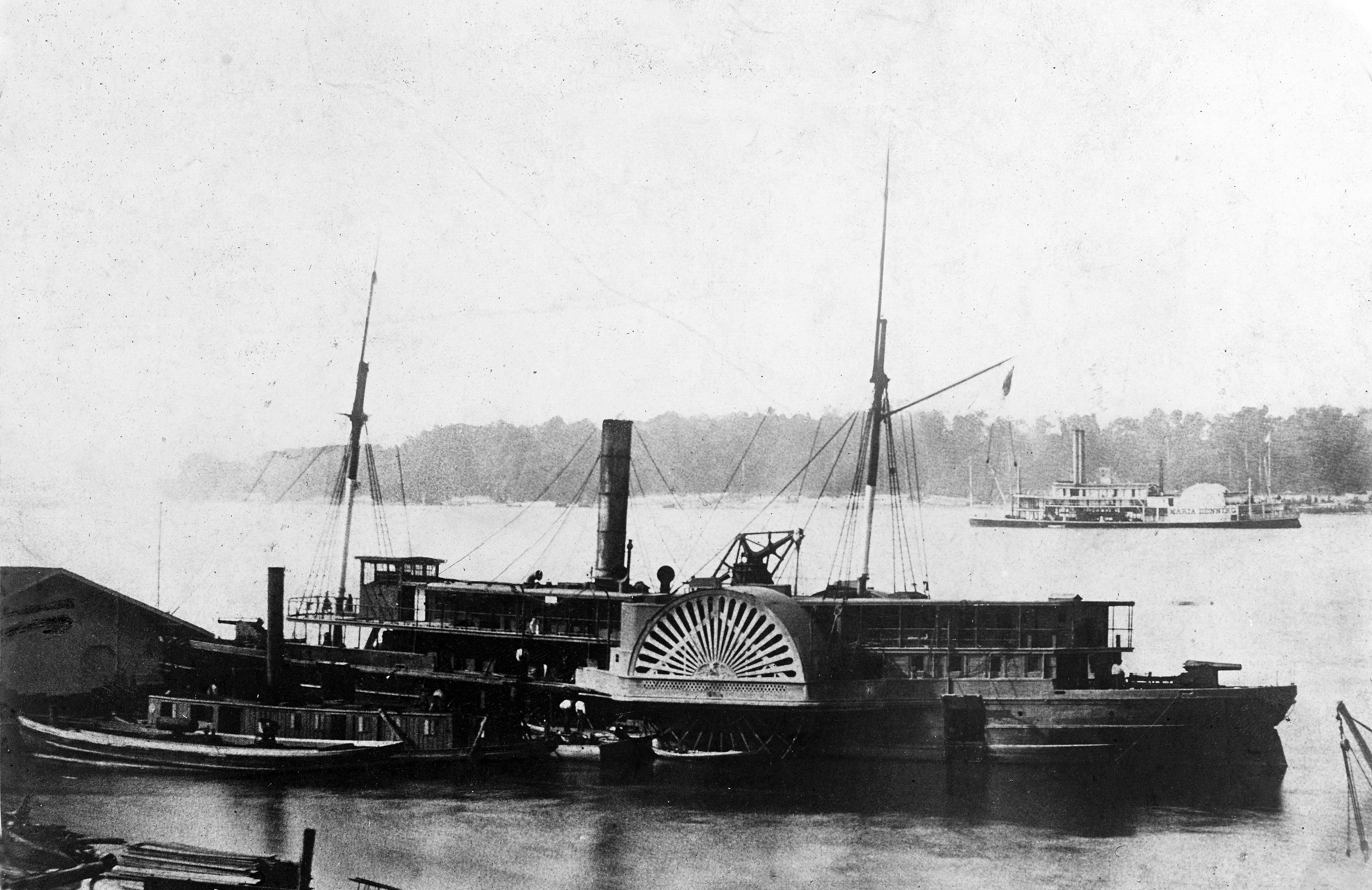
Ex-CSS USS General Bragg

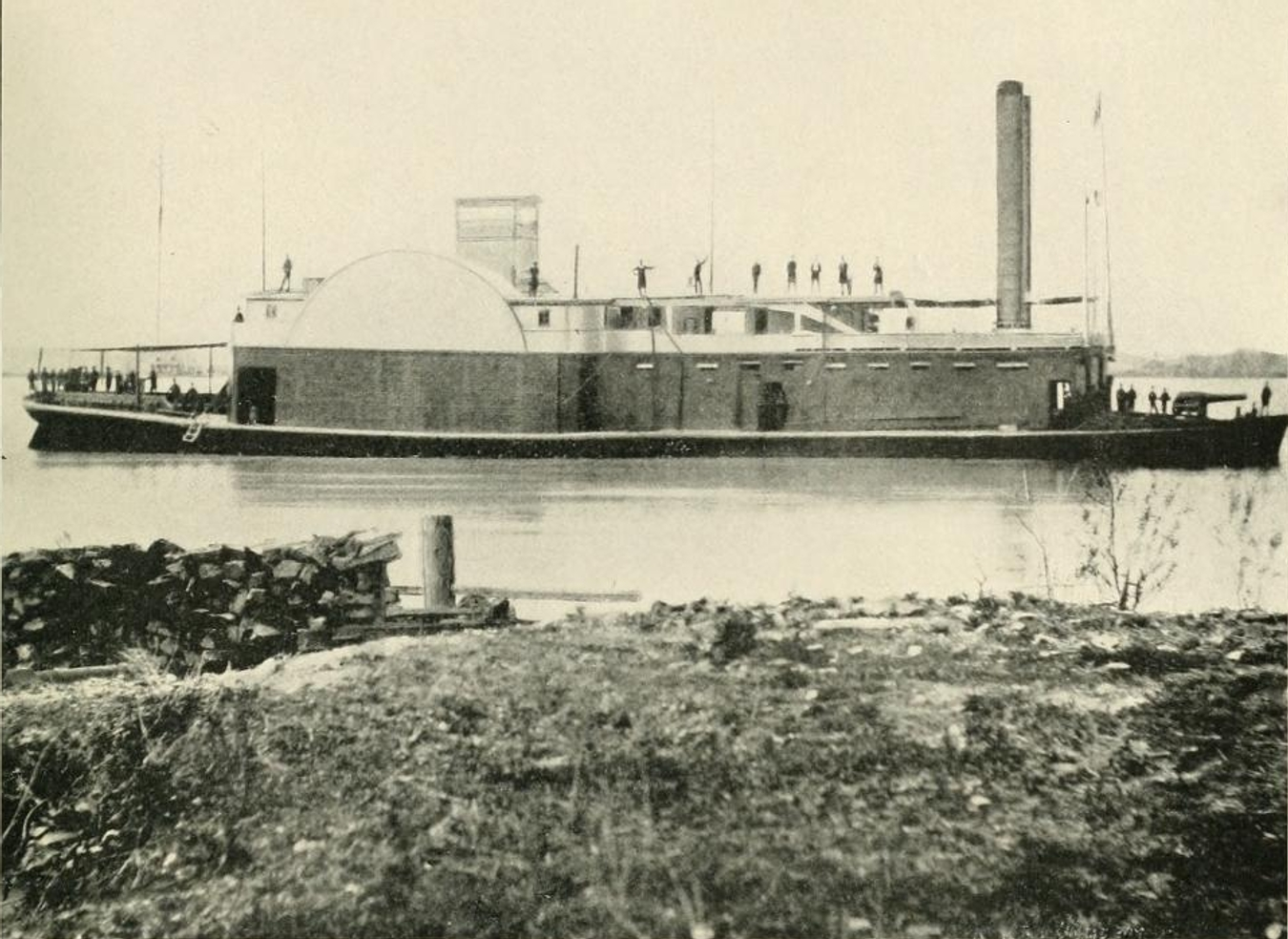
Ex-CSS General Price

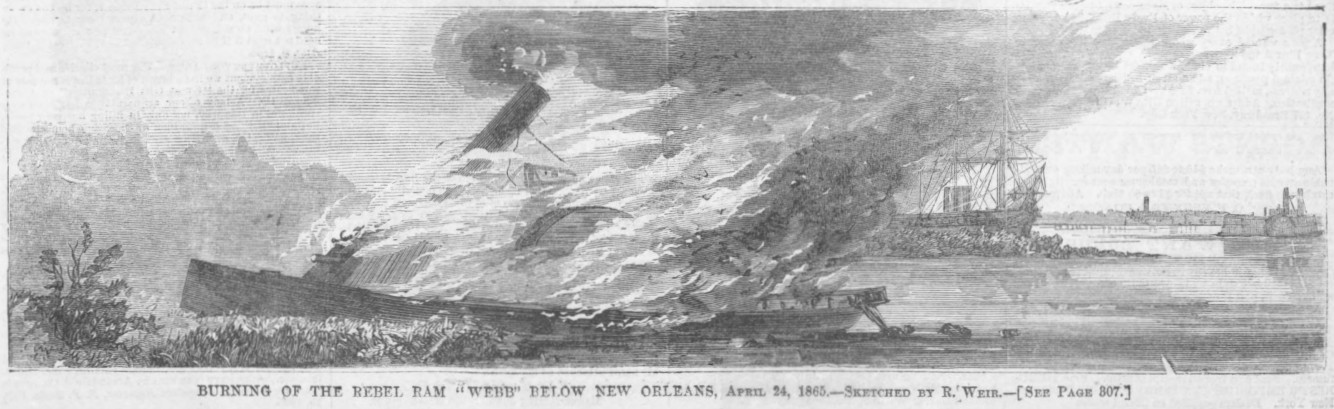
CSS Webb burned April 1865

Used for river defense, CS Army cottonclads were typically more lightly armored and reinforced than a regular ironclad, such as the General Sterling Price, which was converted by placing a 4-inch oak sheath with a 1-inch iron covering on her bow, and by installing double pine bulkheads filled with compressed cotton bales. Many of the cottonclads were outfitted with rams.

River Defense Fleet cotton-clads:

- CSS Colonel Lovell, side-wheel steamer, cotton-clad ram, sunk: June 6, 1862
- CSS General Beauregard, steamer, cotton-clad ram, sunk: June 6, 1862
- CSS General Bragg, steamer, cotton-clad ram, captured: June 6, 1862
- CSS Breckinridge, stern-wheel steamer, cotton-clad ram, burned: Apr, 1862
- CSS Defiance, side-wheel steamer, cotton-clad ram, burned: 1862
- CSS General Earl Van Dorn, steamer, cotton-clad ram, burned
- CSS General M. Jeff Thompson, steamer, cotton-clad ram, sunk: June 6, 1862
- CSS General Sterling Price, steamer, cotton-clad ram, sunk: June 6, 1862; raised into Union service
- CSS General Sumter, steamer, cotton-clad ram, captured: June 6, 1862
- CSS Governor Moore, steamer, schooner rigged, cotton-clad ram, destroyed: April 24, 1862
- CSS Little Rebel, steamer, cotton-clad ram, captured: June 6, 1862
- CSS Resolute, side-wheel steamer, cotton-clad ram
- CSS Stonewall Jackson, side-wheel steamer, cotton-clad ram, burned: April 24, 1862
- CSS Warrior, side-wheel steamer, cotton-clad ram, destroyed: April, 1862

Other CS Army cotton-clads:

- CSS Grand Duke, steamer, cotton-clad, burned: 1863
- CSS Josiah A. Bell, steamer, cotton-clad, operated by Texas Marine Department
- CSS Queen of the West, river steamer, cotton-clad and ironclad ram, exploded: April 14, 1863
- CSS Uncle Ben, steamer, cotton-clad, operated by Texas Marine Department
- CSS Webb, river steamer, cotton-clad ram, transferred to CS Navy early 1865, burned: April, 1865

=== Other CSA boats ===
- CSA General Lee, CS Army transport, which was captured by the Union on August 10, 1862, while the transport was on the Savannah River in Georgia
- CSA John Simonds, CS Army support ship, side-wheel steamer, sunk: April 7, 1862
- CSA Louisville, CS Army cargo steamer, captured: July 13, 1863
- CSA Planter, CS Army transport, side-wheel steamer, surrendered: May 13, 1862

=== Prizes ===
- Alvarado - prize bark, captured: by privateer Jefferson Davis, July 21, 1861
- Enchantress - prize schooner, captured: by privateer Jefferson Davis July 6, 1861

=== Undetermined ===
- CSS Segar
- CSS Smith
- CSS W. R. Miles

== See also ==
- List of ironclads
- Blockade runners of the American Civil War
- Commerce raiding
- Confederate privateer
- Cotton-clad
- Letters of marque
- Ransom Bond
- Bibliography of American Civil War naval history

== Bibliography ==
- Coski, John M. Capital Navy: The Men, Ships and Operations of the James River Squadron, Campbell, CA: Savas Woodbury Publishers, 1996, ISBN 1-882810-03-1
- de Saint Hubert, Christian (1988). "Re: Phantom Fleets: The Confederacy's Unbuilt Warships". Warship International. XXV (3): 225–226. ISSN 0043-0374.
- Gardiner Steam, Steel and Shellfire
- Lambert A., Iron Hulls and Armour Plate
- N.A. (1990). "Re: Phantom Fleets: The Confederacy's Unbuilt Warships". Warship International. XXVII (2): 115. ISSN 0043-0374.
- Scharf, J. Thomas (1887). History of the Confederate States Navy. New York: Rogers & Sherwood.
- Sullivan, D. M.; Wright, C. C. (1988). "Re: Phantom Fleets: The Confederacy's Unbuilt Warships". Warship International. XXV (3): 226. ISSN 0043-0374.
