= Seger (disambiguation) =

Seger is a surname.

Seger may also refer to:

- Seger, Pennsylvania, unincorporated community, Pennsylvania, United States
- CSS A. B. Seger, 19th century American gunboat
- Seger cone, or pyrometric cone
- Seger Indian Training School, Oklahoma, United States
- Seger, Israeli title of Close, Closed, Closure, an Israeli film
