= CSS Juno =

Juno, a fast, iron-framed paddle-wheeler, operated as a mail steamer between London and Glasgow, sailed as a British blockade runner but was purchased by Confederate agents, probably in May 1863. Successfully evading blockaders, she ran into Charleston where she served as a dispatch, picket, and flag-of-truce boat. In July 1863 she was outfitted with a spar torpedo to permit attacks against Union monitors then threatening the defense works on Morris Island, Charleston Harbor. In August 1863 she rammed and sank a launch from USS Wabash, taking its crew captive. Juno returned to running the blockade in the fall of 1863, reportedly suffering capture by USS Connecticut on 22 September off Wilmington, N.C.
