= USS Percy Drayton =

Tender of the United States Navy

History

United States
- Acquired: 12 November 1863
- In service: c. November 1863
- Out of service: c. May 1865
- Captured: by Union Navy forces; 21 January 1863
- Fate: Sold, 2 September 1865

General characteristics
- Displacement: 20 tons
- Propulsion: sloop sail

USS Percy Drayton was a sloop captured by the Union Navy during the American Civil War. She served the Union Navy’s struggle against the Confederate States of America as a ship’s tender, supporting the Union ships on blockade duty with provisions, ammunition, water, and other needs.

== Service history ==
The sloop Percy Drayton, formerly the blockade runner Hettiwan, or Etiwan, captured by USS Ottawa off Charleston, South Carolina, 21 January 1863, was purchased by the Navy at the New York City Prize Court for $331, 12 November 1863. Assigned to the South Atlantic Blockading Squadron she performed tender duties at North Edisto, South Carolina, until May 1865. Shifted then to Port Royal, South Carolina, she was sold for $370, 2 September 1865, to George Crane.

== See also ==
- Blockade runners of the American Civil War
- Blockade mail of the Confederacy
