= CSS Beauregard =

Four ships operated by the Confederate States of America were named Beauregard, after P. G. T. Beauregard, a Confederate States Army general.

- CSS Beauregard (Army steamer), a Confederate steamer captured by the Union Navy while with a bomb boat.
- CSA Beauregard, an army steamer, captured by United States Army forces.
- Beauregard, a privateer two-masted brig schooner, captured.
- CS Beauregard, an army schooner, burned to prevent capture.

== See also ==
- CSS General Beauregard, confederate cottonclad warship.
- Confederate States Navy
