= CSS Arctic =

Confederate steamer ship, CSS Arctic

History

Confederate States
- Name: Arctic
- Builder: Theodore Birely
- Laid down: 1851
- Acquired: 1862
- Fate: Scuttled, 24 December 1864

General characteristics
- Tonnage: 125
- Length: 121 ft (36.9 m)
- Beam: 24 ft (7.3 m)
- Draft: 12 ft (3.7 m)
- Armament: 3 guns

CSS Arctic was a Confederate ironclad floating battery converted from USS Arctic at Wilmington, North Carolina in 1862. Confederate forces seized USS Arctic at the beginning of the war and converted into a receiving ship. Arctic was a 328-ton screw steamer built in Philadelphia in 1851 at the navy yard by Theodore Birely. The two-decked, three-masted steamer measured 121 feet (37 m) in length, 24 feet (7.3 m) in beam, 12 feet (3.7 m) in depth, and 125 tons.

== Cape Fear River ==
CSS Arctic performed additional duty as receiving ship for Flag Officer Robert F Pinkney's North Carolina defense force. She was stationed in the Cape Fear River from 1862 to 1864, with Lieutenant C B Poindexter in command. Her machinery had been removed in the latter part of 1862 for the ironclad CSS Richmond then completing at Richmond, Virginia. With the threat to Wilmington, created by the arrival off Fort Fisher of the joint army-navy expedition under Rear Admiral Porter and Major General Butler, Arctic was sunk on 24 December 1864 to obstruct the river channel. The location of the obstruction in front of Fort Campbell on the east side of the river is clearly indicated on a Confederate map of the period.

== Lightship ==
In June 1866 salvors raised Arctic, described as "a dismantled hull, blackened with age and decay," from the Cape Fear River. The ship was brought to the Cassidey and Beery shipyard in Wilmington, where it was repaired and refitted during January 1867. The government equipped Arctic with new rigging and lamps with the intention of converting it back into a lightship. Reports indicate that United States Lighthouse Service removed Lightship No 8 from the Cape Fear region in May 1867 for reassignment. In 1872 a new mast was stepped and minor repairs made. Lightship No 8 continued to serve as a relief lightship until a structural survey in 1878 condemned the ship. On April 16, 1879, the lightship was sold for scrap at public auction.

== Bibliography ==
- Bisbee, Saxon T. (2018). Engines of Rebellion: Confederate Ironclads and Steam Engineering in the American Civil War. Tuscaloosa, Alabama: University of Alabama Press. ISBN 978-0-81731-986-1.
- Canney, Donald L. (2015). The Confederate Steam Navy 1861-1865. Atglen, Pennsylvania: Schiffer Publishing. ISBN 978-0-7643-4824-2.
