= Berwick Bay (ship) =

Coordinates: 31.01807°N 91.74845°W

History
- Name: Berwick Bay
- Namesake: Berwick Bay, Louisiana
- Operator: Confederate States of America
- Captured: 3 February 1863
- Fate: Captured by Union forces and destroyed

General characteristics
- Type: steamer
- Displacement: 64 tons

Berwick Bay was a steamer engaged in transporting supplies for the Confederates in the Mississippi River area. She was captured and destroyed on 3 February 1863 by Ellet's Ram Fleet as she came out of the Red River heavily laden with supplies for Port Hudson, Louisiana. She displaced 64 tons and was named for Berwick Bay, Louisiana.

== See also ==
- Mississippi Marine Brigade
