= CSS Nashville (1853) =

Steamboat

Coordinates: 31.8899°N 81.2184°W

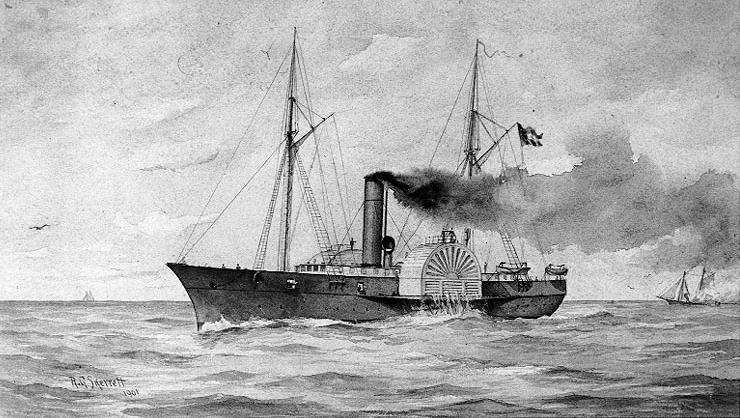
- CSS Nashville

History

Confederate States
- Name: Nashville
- Builder: William Collyer (Greenpoint, NY)
- Launched: 22 Sep 1853
- Christened: SS Nashville
- Commissioned: (CSN): Oct 1861–Mar 1862
- Maiden voyage: 4 Jan 1854
- In service: 4 Jan 1854–28 Feb 1863
- Renamed: CSS Nashville (1861); SS Thomas L. Wragg (1862); SS Rattlesnake (1862)
- Fate: Sunk by USN, 28 February 1863

General characteristics
- Displacement: 1,221 long tons (1,241 t)
- Length: 215 ft 6 in (65.68 m)
- Beam: 34 ft 6 in (10.52 m)
- Draft: 21 ft 9 in (6.63 m)
- Propulsion: Sails and steam engine
- Complement: 40 officers and men
- Armament: 2 × 12-pounder (5 kg) cannons

CSS Nashville was a brig-rigged, side-paddle-wheel passenger steamer that served with the Confederate Navy during the Civil War.

== History ==
Originally a United States Mail Service ship, the USMS Nashville was built at Greenpoint, Brooklyn in 1853. Between 1853 and 1861 she was engaged in running between New York City and Charleston, South Carolina. During the Battle of Fort Sumter, the USMS Nashville sailed into Charleston without flying the US national standard and was fired upon by the USRC Harriet Lane which marked the first shot of the naval war in the Civil War. The Nashville raised the American flag, and after the surrender of Sumter, the Nashville docked at Charleston.

After the fall of Fort Sumter, the Confederates captured her at Charleston and fitted her out as a cruiser. Under the command of Lieutenant Robert B. Pegram, CSN, she ran the blockade on October 21, 1861, and headed across the Atlantic to Southampton, England, the first ship of war to fly the Confederate flag in English waters. On November 19, 1861, near the British Isles, she boarded and burned an American merchant ship, the Harvey Birch, the first such action by a Confederate commerce raider in the North Atlantic during the war.

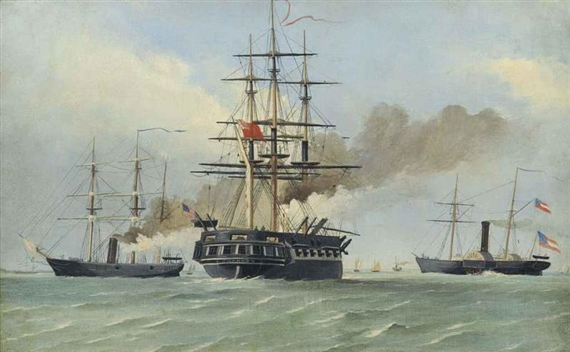
HMS Shannon enforcing International Law between the Union gunboat Tuscarora and the Confederate blockade-runner Thomas L. Wragg in Southampton Water, 1862

Nashville returned to Beaufort, North Carolina on February 28, 1862, having captured two prizes worth US$66,000 during the cruise. In this interval she was sold for use as a blockade runner and renamed Thomas L. Wragg.

On November 5, 1862, she was commissioned as the privateer Rattlesnake. After she ran fast aground on the Ogeechee River, Georgia, the monitor USS Montauk destroyed her with shell fire from 11-inch (279-mm) and 15-inch (381-mm) turret guns on February 28, 1863.

British writer Francis Warrington Dawson (born Austin John Reeks), then a youth of 21, joined the crew of the Nashville in 1862 in order to make passage from Britain to the Confederacy, with whose cause he sympathized. He later wrote a book about his experience as an expatriate Briton in the Confederacy, Reminiscences of Confederate Service, 1861-1865, the first seven chapters of which detail his observations and experiences aboard the Nashville.

== See also ==
- Ships captured in the American Civil War
- Bibliography of American Civil War naval history
