= CSS Rob Roy =

Confederate schooner and blockade runner

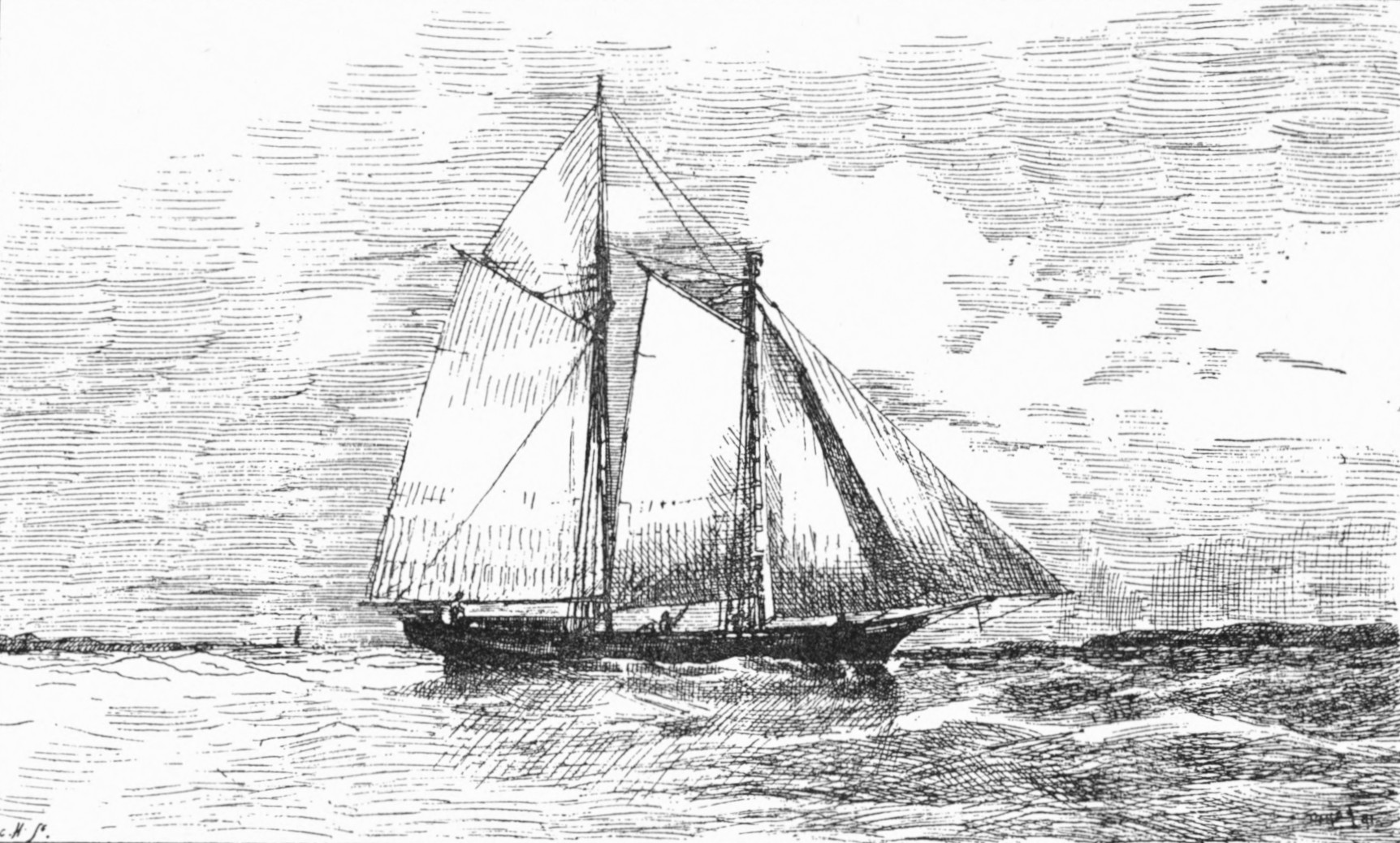
- CSS Rob Roy

History

Confederate States
- Name: Rob Roy
- In service: 1862
- Out of service: 2 March 1865

General characteristics
- Type: Centerboard schooner
- Length: 78 ft (24 m)
- Beam: 22 ft 6 in (6.86 m)
- Draft: 4 ft 9 in (1.45 m) with centerboard up; 13 ft (4.0 m) with centerboard down
- Depth of hold: 6 ft (1.8 m)
- Sail plan: Schooner
- Complement: 8

CSS Rob Roy was a Confederate blockade runner commanded by Captain William Watson, that ran to and from Bermuda, the Bahamas and Cuba from 1862 to 1864, during the American Civil War.

Watson, who had immigrated from Great Britain several years before, had originally enlisted in the Confederate Army as a sergeant before being wounded at the Second Battle of Corinth, and discharged due to his injuries. Hiring out a schooner, commissioned as Rob Roy, Watson would bring desperately needed supplies into blockaded southern ports, specifically Galveston, Texas before selling the ship after financial disagreements with business associates. She was finally chased ashore and run aground by the Union vessel Fox and the USS Stars and Stripes on 2 March 1865 at Deadmans Bay where her crew set her on fire. Watson would later write about his wartime naval career in an autobiography The Civil War Adventures of a Blockade Runner in 1892.
