= Prince Albert (ship) =

Several vessels have been named Prince Albert or Prins Albert:

- Prince Albert (1842) was a wooden steam paddle passenger vessel built at Walker-on-Tyne for service on the River Thames. Later, as a screw steamer she was a successful American Civil War blockade runner, but grounded in August 1864 entering Charleston Harbour the second time and was destroyed by Union gunfire.
- HMS Prince Albert was to have been a 91-gun screw-propelled second rate. She was renamed HMS Princess Royal before her launch in 1853 and was sold in 1872.
- HMS Prince Albert (1864) was an iron screw turret ship launched in 1864 and sold in 1899.
- Prince Albert (1903) was a Belgian cargo steamer, launched on the Tyne in 1903. She struck a mine and sank in the North Sea on 30 July 1915.
- Prince Albert II was a former name of the cruiseship Silver Explorer, built in Finland in 1989.

See also:

- Prins Albert (1937) was a Belgian cross-Channel ferry which was hired by the Admiralty in 1940 and served as the landing ship HMS Prins Albert between 1941 and 1946. She then returned to Ostend-Dover/Folkestone service until 1968.
- Prins Albert (1977) was a Belgian cross-Channel roll-on/roll-off ferry operated between 1978 and 1998 between Ostend and Dover.
