= USS Sarah and Caroline =

Schooner

History

United States
- Acquired: 1 August 1863
- Captured: 11 December 1861
- Fate: Sold, 8 August 1865 at

General characteristics
- Propulsion: schooner sail

USS Sarah and Caroline was a schooner captured by the Union Navy during the beginning of the American Civil War.

She served the Union Navy during the blockade of ports and waterways of the Confederate States of America as a ship's tender.

== Service history ==
While on blockade duty on the afternoon of 11 December 1861, Union side wheel steamer, USS Bienville, sighted two sails and immediately gave chase. She succeeded in driving one ship aground in the breakers at the mouth of the St. Johns River, and she captured the other, a small pilot-boat schooner, named Sarah and Caroline. The prize had slipped out of Jacksonville, Florida, and was bound for Nassau, New Providence, in the Bahamas, carrying 60 barrels of turpentine. The dangers of the Atlantic Ocean in winter precluded sending the frail schooner north for adjudication, so she was kept at Port Royal, South Carolina. Although no record of her service has been found, Sarah and Caroline apparently served the South Atlantic Blockading Squadron as a ship's tender. In any case, she was purchased by the Navy from the New York City prize court on 1 August 1863. After the Civil War ended, she was sold at Port Royal on 8 August 1865.

== See also ==
- Blockade runners of the American Civil War
- Blockade mail of the Confederacy
- Union Blockade
