= Monticello (privateer) =

Confederate blockade runner

Monticello was a Confederate blockade runner during the American Civil War. She was a two-masted schooner out of Havana, Cuba and of unknown nationality. She ran ashore about 6 to 8 miles east of Fort Morgan and the main inlet to Mobile Bay in Alabama on June 26, 1862, after sailing from Havana; her crew then set her on fire to prevent her capture. A landing party from the USS Kanawha attempted to board Monticello, but Confederate soldiers firing from nearby on the shore drove them off. Her length was 136 feet. She was likely cruising just off shore along the Swash Channel when she ran aground.

The wreckage of Monticello is exposed occasionally when severe storms hit the area; wreckage identified as the ship was uncovered after Hurricane Camille in 1969, after Hurricane Ivan in 2004, and after Hurricane Ike in 2008. Although some speculated that a shipwreck that was unearthed after Hurricane Isaac in 2012 was Monticello, experts later identified the ship as Rachael, a three-mast schooner that ran aground in 1933.
