= CSS A. B. Seger =

Confederate States Navy gunboat

History

Confederate States of America
- Name: CSS A. B. Seger
- Acquired: 1861

General characteristics
- Type: dispatch boat
- Displacement: 30 tons
- Length: 55 ft (17 m)
- Propulsion: 2 locomotive engines
- Armament: 2 guns

The A. B. Seger (sometimes called the Seger, Segar, or Segur) was acquired by the Confederate States Navy in 1861 for service as a gunboat in Berwick Bay, Louisiana. The steamer operated with the naval force of Flag Officer George N. Hollins, CSN, who was charged with the defence of the Mississippi River and Louisiana coast.

The little gunboat was powered by two locomotive engines with "cylinders bolted to the top of and axis parallel to" her boiler—also from a railway locomotive. During 1862 A. B. Seger served as a dispatch boat, commanded by Acting Master I. C. Coons. As the Federal Flotilla under Lt. Comdr. Buchanan proceeded up Atchafalaya Bay on 1 November 1862, A. B. Seger was run aground and abandoned near Berwick Bay. She was then seized and placed in service by the Union.

== Specification ==
The ship was a side wheel steamer of 30 tons, 55 feet (17 m) long and mounting two guns.

== Bibliography ==
- Silverstone, Paul H. (2006). Civil War Navies 1855–1883. The U.S. Navy Warship Series. New York: Routledge. ISBN 978-0-415-97870-5.

c
