= CSS Colonel Lovell =

Ram used by the Confederate Navy during the American Civil War

Coordinates: 35.206°N 90.068°W

History

Confederate States
- Name: Colonel Lovell
- Namesake: William S. Lovell
- Launched: 1843
- Acquired: 1862
- Fate: Rammed and sunk, 6 June 1862

General characteristics
- Type: Side-wheel cotton-clad ram
- Tonnage: 521 long tons (529 t)
- Length: 162 ft (49 m)
- Beam: 30 ft 10 in (9.40 m)
- Draft: 11 ft (3.4 m)
- Propulsion: Steam engine, side paddle wheels
- Complement: 86
- Armor: Two cannons, including an 8-inch smoothbore

CSS Colonel Lovell was a cottonclad ram operated by the Confederacy during the American Civil War. Built at Cincinnati, Ohio, in 1843 as the towboat Hercules, the vessel was purchased by the Confederates in early 1862 and became part of the River Defense Fleet, which was operated by the Confederate States Army. Sent up the Mississippi River, Colonel Lovell was part of the Confederate fleet at the Battle of Plum Point Bend on May 10, 1862, but did not reach the site of the battle until it was almost over. On June 6, Colonel Lovell participated in the First Battle of Memphis. Early in the battle, Colonel Lovell was rammed by the United States Ram Fleet vessel USS Queen of the West with such force that the Confederate vessel nearly broke in two; she sank quickly with the loss of most of her crew.

== Civilian use ==
Built as the sidewheel steamer Hercules at Cincinnati, Ohio, in 1843. She was operated by the Ocean Towing Co. until the American Civil War; this company was based out of New Orleans, Louisiana. Hercules had tonnage of 521 tons, a beam of 30 feet 10 inches (9.40 m), a length of 162 feet (49 m), and a draft of 11 feet (3.4 m). She was primarily used as a towboat, bringing ships upriver from the Head of Passes to New Orleans. Hercules likely had one funnel and was probably equipped with hog chains.

== Service history ==
In 1862, the Confederacy purchased 14 civilian vessels, including Hercules, for conversion into military vessels for service on the Mississippi River. The purchased occurred under the auspices of Confederate Major General Mansfield Lovell. These ships became the River Defense Fleet and were operated by the Confederate States Army, not the Confederate States Navy.

Known as cottonclads, the vessels were intended to be used as rams. To convert the civilian vessels into warships, iron plating was added to their bows, and wooden bulkheads packed with cotton were added as protection for the ships' critical machinery. These conversions were oversaw by Lieutenant Colonel William S. Lovell (brother to Mansfield Lovell), who had been educated at the United States Naval Academy. William Lovell also oversaw the arming of the vessels, as the ordnance and disbursing officer for the fleet. Hercules was renamed Colonel Lovell after William Lovell, who became one of the first graduates of the Naval Academy to be the namesake of a warship. Of the River Defense Fleet vessels, Colonel Lovell was the second slowest, faster than only CSS General M. Jeff Thompson. Under the command of vetern riverboat pilot Captain James C. Delancy, Colonel Lovell left the shipyard in New Orleans where she was converted on April 17, 1862. Union reports claimed she was armed with four cannons, while the naval historian Edward B. McCaul notes that the eight River Defense Fleet vessels sent up the Mississippi River combined for a total armament of two cannons; the unarmed ships were armed with a single 32-pounder gun placed at the stern after reaching Fort Pillow. Subsequent to the Battle of Plum Point Bend, which was fought on May 10, four of the ships (including Colonel Lovell) had their armament augmented by a 8-inch smoothbore cannon at the bow.

=== Battles of Plum Point Bend and Memphis ===
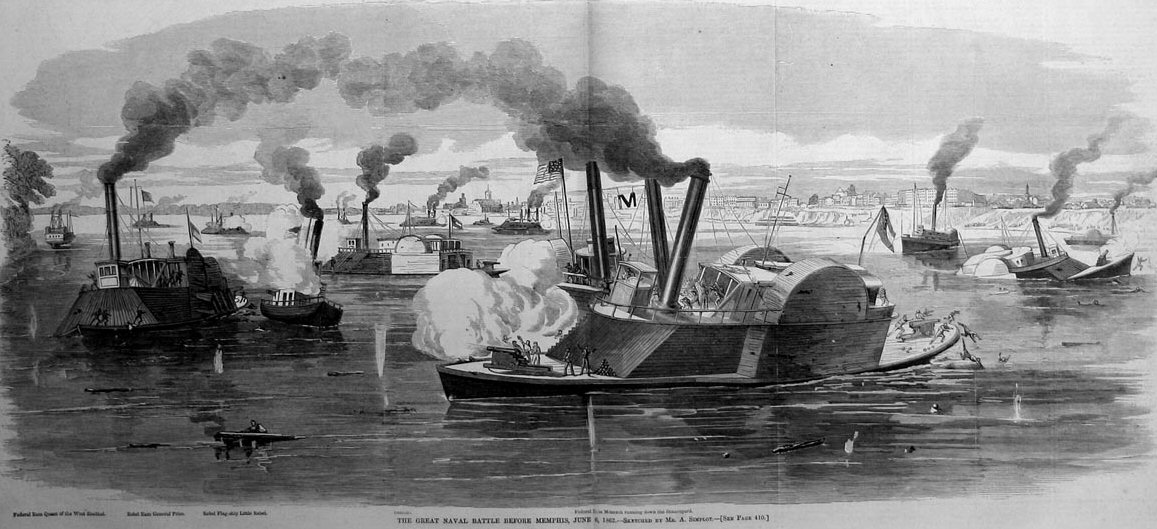
The destruction of the Confederate fleet at the First Battle of Memphis

The eight River Defense Fleet ships which had gone upriver were at Fort Pillow were under the command of Captain James E. Montgomery. Fort Pillow was under bombardment by mortar boats from Union Navy force commanded by Captain Charles Henry Davis. The Union fleet had fallen into a routine of having a single mortar boat bombard the fort each day from a position downriver of the rest of the fleet, guarded by a single ironclad. Montgomery saw an opportunity and decided to attack with his cottonclad rams. The resulting attack, known as the Battle of Plum Point Bend, occurred on May 10. Montgomery had his ships approach the Union position in order of speed, which left Colonel Lovell as the second-to-last ship in the Confederate line. The crew of the downriver ironclad, USS Cincinnati, were caught by surprise and Cincinnati was rammed and sunk. Davis's other ironclads moved downriver as the became ready, and USS Mound City was also sunk. Colonel Lovell, General M. Jeff Thompson, and CSS General Beauregard arrived later in the battle; the remaining Union ironclads had reached the battle site by this time and Montgomery soon ordered a withdrawal.

The Confederate position at Fort Pillow was rendered untenable by the Union victory at the Siege of Corinth which ended on May 30; the fort was abandoned on June 4. The Confederate ships that had been at Fort Pillow retreated downriver to Memphis, Tennessee, where they arrived on June 5. That night, faced with a shortage of coal, Montgomery and his captains held a council of war which resulted in the decision to fight the approaching Union fleet rather than scuttle part or all of the fleet. With Davis's ships approaching Memphis on the morning on June 6, Montgomery deployed his ships into two columns, each of which was arrayed en echelon. The two front ships were General M. Jeff Thompson and Colonel Lovell, the latter of whom was part of the left column. These two ships were in the front rank due to their slower speed and because both were equipped with the 8-inch cannon, which was more effective against the armored Union ironclads. The First Battle of Memphis followed as Davis, with nine warships, fought Montgomery's fleet. The Union fleet consisted of five ironclads and four vessels of the United States Ram Fleet.

Two of the rams, Monarch and Queen of the West, were in the lead of the Union approach. Montgomery countered by sending CSS General Sterling Price and Colonel Lovell to fight the rams. Colonel Lovell headed directly for one of the Union rams. The naval historian Neil Chatelain writes that Delancy "lost his nerve at the last minute" and tried to steer the ship out of the way by having the engines backed; while the Dictionary of American Naval Fighting Ships instead attributes what happens next to the ship suffering an engine malfunction. Colonel Lovell was rammed by Queen of the West with such force that the Confederate ships was nearly broken in two. Monarch struck Colonel Lovell a second blow afterwards. She sank quickly; 68 of her 86 crewmembers perished. Delancy was one of the survivors. Montgomery's fleet was defeated in the battle and Union forces took Memphis; all but one of the Confederate ships were destroyed or captured.

== Sources ==
- Calore, Paul (2002). Naval Campaigns of the Civil War. Jefferson, North Carolina: McFarland & Company. ISBN 978-0-7864-1217-4.
- Canney, Donald L. (2015). The Confederate Steam Navy 1861–1865. Atglen, Pennsylvania: Schiffer. ISBN 978-0-7643-4824-2.
- Chatelain, Neil P. (2020). Defending the Arteries of Rebellion: Confederate Naval Operations in the Mississippi River Valley, 1861–1865. El Dorado Hills, California: Savas Beatie. ISBN 978-1-61121-510-6.
- Gaines, W. Craig (2008). Encyclopedia of Civil War Shipwrecks. Baton Rouge, Louisiana: Louisiana State University Press. ISBN 978-0-8071-3274-6.
- McCaul, Edward B. Jr (2014). To Retain Command of the Mississippi: The Civil War Naval Campaign for Memphis. Knoxville, Tennessee: University of Tennessee Press. ISBN 978-1-62190-135-8.
- Tomblin, Barbara Brooks (2016). The Civil War on the Mississippi: Union Sailors, Gunboat Captains, and the Campaign to Control the River. Lexington, Kentucky: University Press of Kentucky. ISBN 978-0-8131-6704-6.
