= CSS General Sumter =

American Civil War sidewheel paddle streamer

Coordinates: 30.76108°N 91.39852°W

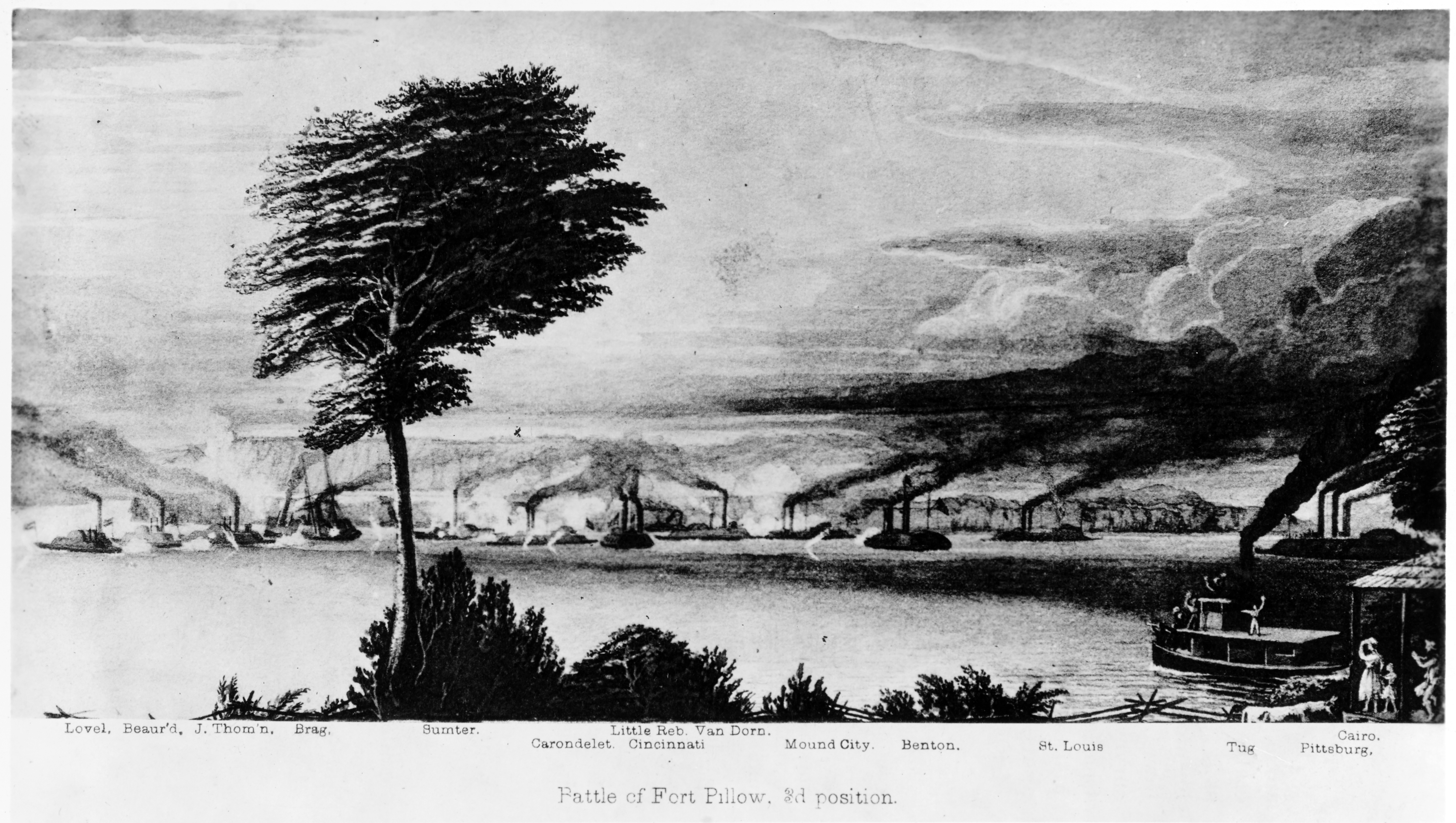
- The River Defense Fleet in the Battle of Plum Point Bend.

History

United States
- Acquired: January 1862 (by Confederacy)
- In service: April 17, 1862
- Captured: by U.S. Navy ca. 6 June 1862 (First Battle of Memphis)
- Fate: Ran aground 14–15 August 1862; Stripped and burned

General characteristics
- Tonnage: 400, 524, or 525 tons
- Length: 182 ft (55 m)
- Beam: 28 ft 4 in (8.64 m)
- Draught: depth of hold 10 ft 8 in (3.25 m)
- Propulsion: Steam engine; sidewheel
- Armament: 1 32-pounder gun and 1 8-inch smoothbore
- Armour: Iron plate, cotton bales

CSS General Sumter was a sidewheel steamer which was operated by both the Confederate States Army and the Union Navy during the American Civil War. A civilian vessel before the war, the ship was acquired by the Confederates in January 1862 for use in the River Defense Fleet. Modified into a cottonclad naval ram, General Sumter served on the Mississippi River. Present at the Battle of Plum Point Bend on May 10, General Sumter applied the final of three ramming blows to the ironclad USS Cincinnati, which sank the Union vessel. On June 6, during the First Battle of Memphis, General Sumter rammed and disabled the Union ram Queen of the West before being damaged and running aground herself. The vessel was repaired and entered Union service as the USS Sumter before running aground near Bayou Sara, Louisiana, in August, after which the wreck was stripped for machinery and then burned.

== Characteristics and Confederate acquisition ==
During the American Civil War, the government of the Confederate States of America authorized the confiscation of 14 steamboats to be converted into warships for the defense of the Mississippi River and New Orleans, Louisiana. While Major General Mansfield Lovell had authorization to take the vessels without payment, the Confederacy did eventually compensate their former owners, although at amounts below what a board had estimated the ships' collective value at. The vessels were operated by the Confederate States Army, rather than the Confederate States Navy, as the River Defense Fleet. The prewar histories of many of these vessels are unclear. One of the vessels acquired was the towboat Junius Beebe, which had been constructed in 1853. Sources differ as to if the Junius Beebe became General Sumter or General Earl Van Dorn in Confederate service.

A sidewheel steamer, General Sumter was 182 feet (55 m) long, with a beam of 28 feet 4 inches (8.64 m) and a depth of hold of 10 feet 8 inches (3.25 m). Her tonnage is variously reported as 400, 524, or 525 tons. Unlike most riverboats of the time, she had low pressure machinery. According to naval historian Edward B. McCaul, the vessel's Confederate name was in honor of Thomas Sumter, who was a general during the American Revolutionary War. The process of converting General Sumter into a warship took place at Algiers, Louisiana, at the James Martin shipyard, and began on January 25, 1862. The civilian vessel was converted into a type of naval ram known as a cottonclad. The vessels of the River Defense Fleet were commanded by men with experience operating steamboats on the western rivers. Their bows were strengthened by the addition of one-foot-square timbers, which was overlaid with 4 inches (10 cm) of oak and 1 inch (2.5 cm) of iron. Bulkheads filled with compressed cotton protected the ships' machinery.

== Confederate service and capture ==
The conversion work completed, General Sumter left the shipyard on April 17, 1862, and was sent up the Mississippi River, bringing fleet commander J. E. Montgomery upriver with her. General Sumter was commanded by William W. Lamb. Of the River Defense Fleet vessels, eight of the fourteen were sent upriver. The fleet only had two cannons between the eight vessels. Those without armament were equipped with a 32-pounder smoothbore cannon from Fort Pillow. While additional ships had previously been part of the river defenses at Fort Pillow, they were reassigned to other locations, leaving only Montgomery and the eight ships of the River Defense Fleet there.

Further upriver, Union Navy vessels opposed the Confederates at Fort Pillow. The Union force operated in a routine where a single mortar boat moved downriver each day to bombard Fort Pillow, guarded by an ironclad warship, while the rest of the fleet remained upriver. Along with CSS General Bragg and CSS General Earl Van Dorn, General Sumter sortied upriver on the morning of May 8, but the Union vessels had not yet moved downriver and little combat occurred; the Confederate ships returned to their previous positions. The following day, Montgomery held a council of war, which resulted in plans to attack the Union forces the next morning. The crews of the Confederate ships were reinforced by soldiers from the Missouri State Guard for the coming battle. Montgomery's fleet approached the Union position with the ships aligned in order of speed; General Sumter was the second-fastest of the Confederate ships.

The crews of the two Union ships – Mortar Boat No. 16 and the ironclad USS Cincinnati – were caught by surprise in what became the Battle of Plum Point Bend. General Bragg rammed Cincinnati, which was then rammed again by CSS General Sterling Price. With Cincinnati swinging around from the ramming blows, General Sumter struck the ironclad a third blow. The Union vessel eventually sank in 11 feet (3.4 m) of water due to her damage, but not before sharpshooters on General Sumter wounded her commander, Roger N. Stembel. Later in the engagement, General Earl Van Dorn rammed and sunk the ironclad USS Mound City; when more of the Union ships arrived, the Confederates broke off the engagement and withdrew back to Fort Pillow.

After the battle at Plum Point Bend, the Union resumed the bombardment of Fort Pillow and the two sunken ironclads were eventually raised and returned to service. On May 30, Confederate troops further inland evacuated Corinth, Mississippi, which made the position at Fort Pillow untenable. Montgomery's troops covered the abandonment of Fort Pillow and withdrew downriver to Memphis, Tennessee, which they reached on June 5. During the evacuation of Fort Pillow, four of the River Defense Fleet vessels had an 8-inch smoothbore cannon from the fort's defenses added to their armament; General Sumter was one of these vessels. Late on June 5, Montgomery and his captains decided to stay and fight against the approaching Union fleet instead of withdrawing; they were unaware that the Union fleet which had fought at Plum Point Bend had been reinforced by the United States Ram Fleet.

Montgomery aligned six of his ships for the upcoming fight into three rows of two ships – General Sumter was part of the second row. During the ensuing First Battle of Memphis, the Union ram USS Queen of the West rammed and sank the CSS Colonel Lovell. General Sumter in turn rammed and disabled the Queen of the West, and while sharpshooters on the two vessels fired at each other, the commander of the Ram Fleet, Colonel Charles Ellet Jr. was mortally wounded. Another of the Union rams, the USS Monarch, rammed General Sumter. The Confederate vessel was damaged and attempted to escape downriver, but ran aground. The vessel's crew did not destroy her, and General Sumter fell into Union hands. Captured, the General Sumter entered service with the Union Navy, in whose service she was known as the Sumter. While in Union service, Sumter ran aground near Bayou Sara, Louisiana, on August 14–15, 1862. Abandoned, the vessel was used as a source of spare parts and the wreck was eventually burned by Confederate forces.

== See also ==
- Ships captured in the American Civil War
- Bibliography of American Civil War naval history
- Mississippi Squadron

== Sources ==
- Bearss, Edwin C. (1980) [1966]. Hardluck Ironclad: The Sinking and Salvage of the Cairo. Baton Rouge, Louisiana: Louisiana State University Press. ISBN 0-8071-0684-4.
- Canney, Donald L. (2015). The Confederate Steam Navy 1861–1865. Atglen, Pennsylvania: Schiffer. ISBN 978-0-7643-4824-2.
- Chatelain, Neil P. (2020). Defending the Arteries of Rebellion: Confederate Naval Operations in the Mississippi River Valley, 1861–1865. El Dorado Hills, California: Savas Beatie. ISBN 978-1-61121-510-6.
- Gaines, W. Craig (2008). Encyclopedia of Civil War Shipwrecks. Baton Rouge, Louisiana: Louisiana State University Press. ISBN 978-0-8071-3274-6.
- McCaul, Edward B. Jr (2014). To Retain Command of the Mississippi: The Civil War Naval Campaign for Memphis. Knoxville, Tennessee: University of Tennessee Press. ISBN 978-1-62190-135-8.
