= Battle of Plum Point Bend =

Naval battle of the American Civil War

Coordinates: 35°40′N 89°52′W

- Part of the American Civil War
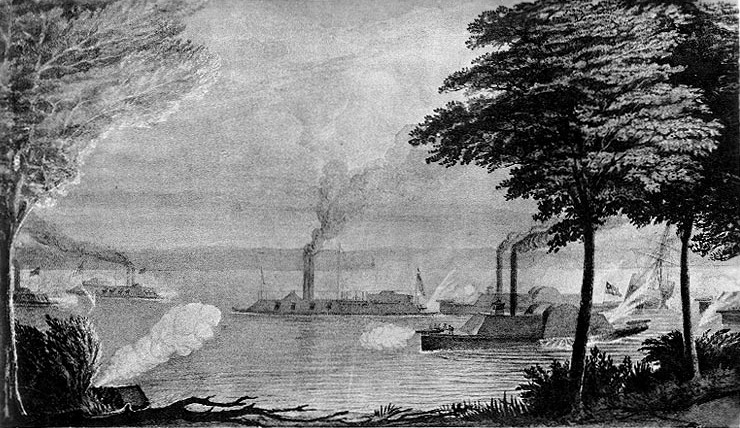
- Battle of Plum Point Bend, Tennessee, May 10, 1862. The Confederate vessels are to the right, while the Union ironclads are in the center and left
Date	May 10, 1862 (164 years ago)
Location	Near Fort Wright, Tennessee
Result	Confederate Victory

Belligerents
Confederate States	United States (Union)

Commanders and leaders
J. E. Montgomery (Confederate States of America) M. Jeff Thompson	Charles H. Davis

Units involved
River Defense Service	Mississippi Flotilla

Strength
8 cottonclad rams	7 ironclad warships and 1 mortar boat

Casualties and losses
c. 12 men killed or wounded	2 ironclads sunk 4 men killed or wounded

The Battle of Plum Point Bend, also known as the Battle of Plum Run Bend, was naval battle of the American Civil War fought on May 10, 1862, between the River Defense Service (Confederate States) and the Mississippi Flotilla (Union) near Fort Wright, Tennessee. Fighting for control of the Mississippi River had been ongoing since the prior year as Union forces pushed downriver to Fort Pillow, about 50 miles (80 km) north of Memphis.

The United States Navy had been using mortar boats to bombard Fort Pillow, and had settled into a regular routine. The Union's daily tactic was to send a single mortar boat guarded by an ironclad warship to a position further downriver to shell the fort, while the rest of the fleet remained upriver. On the morning of May 10, the Confederates attacked in the hope of capturing the guard ironclad and then surprising the rest of the Union fleet.

When the attack came, most of the Union ironclads did not have steam pressure built up and so were unprepared to move. Three of the eight Confederate vessels, CSS General Bragg, CSS General Sterling Price, and CSS General Sumter, rammed the guard ironclad, USS Cincinnati; the Union vessel later sank from her damage. Two further ironclads were able to steam from the main group upriver and join the action: USS Carondelet and USS Mound City. In turn, CSS General Earl Van Dorn rammed Mound City; the Union vessel was damaged so severely that she was later run aground on a shoal, where she sank.

A third Union ironclad, USS Benton, arrived later in the fighting. The Union ironclads had lighter drafts (Note: Draft is a measure of the depth of a ship below its waterline) than the Confederate vessels and maneuvered into shallower water where they were safe from Confederate ramming attempts. As the Confederate ships' guns were inferior to those of the Union ships, the Confederates withdrew, pursued by Benton and Carondelet. Several of the Confederate ships were damaged during the battle. The loss of Cincinnati and Mound City prompted the Union to strengthen the waterline of their ships. The two ironclads were refloated and returned to service. The battle was a Confederate victory, but with little long-term benefit. The bombardment of Fort Pillow resumed after the battle with altered procedures, and on June 4, the fort was abandoned as the Confederates withdrew from Corinth, Mississippi. On June 6, the River Defense Service was destroyed in the First Battle of Memphis, and the Union gained control of the Mississippi River in July 1863. Plum Point Bend was among the few fleet actions of the war.

== Background ==
When the American Civil War began in April 1861, both the United States and Confederate governments viewed control of the Mississippi River as vital. In September, Confederate forces moved north and captured the town of Columbus, Kentucky, which was on the Mississippi. In February 1862, Union forces commanded by Major General Ulysses S. Grant captured Confederate positions at Fort Henry and Fort Donelson, which had commanded the Tennessee River and the Cumberland River. This compelled the Confederates to abandon western Kentucky including Columbus; the next Confederate stronghold was at Island No. 10 further downriver. The naval component of the Union effort, known as the Mississippi Flotilla, was commanded by Flag Officer Andrew H. Foote.

Union land forces captured abandoned Confederate defensive works at New Madrid, Missouri, on March 14. A few Union ships ran past the Island No. 10 defenses on the nights of April 4/5 and April 6/7 and the position was captured on April 8. The campaign then moved south to Fort Pillow, about 50 miles (80 km) north of Memphis, Tennessee. Foote's Union vessels pursued the retreating Confederates. On April 12, Union ships moved to within a few miles of the fort and bombarded the position with a mortar boat. The core of this flotilla was a group of seven ironclad warships – USS Benton, USS Carondelet, USS Pittsburgh, USS Cincinnati, USS Mound City, USS Cairo, and USS St. Louis – in addition to a collection of lesser vessels, including the mortar boats. Cairo, St. Louis, Pittsburgh, Mound City, Carondelet, and Cincinnati were City-class ironclads, which were designed to have a shallow draft, iron armor, and an armament of thirteen cannons. Benton had been converted from a civilian snagboat and was armed with sixteen cannons.

The Union routine was to send a single mortar boat guarded by an ironclad in a position closer to the fort, with the rest of the fleet upriver; the boats would rotate on or off bombardment duty every day. Foote issued orders for the boats to be in a state of combat readiness at all times. Captain Charles H. Davis took command of the Union squadron on May 9, as Foote was struggling to recover from a wound. Bends in the river allowed the Union to take up bombardment positions not directly exposed to Confederate fire from the fort. At Plum Point Bend, the channel of the Mississippi River diverged in two; the channels rejoined and then rounded Craighead Point to pass Fort Pillow; the Union vessels took positions between Plume Point Bend and Craighead Point.

While several Confederate vessels were sent to other threatened locations, Captain J. E. Montgomery and eight cottonclad rams known as the River Defense Service, were located off Fort Pillow. (Note: Montgomery signed his reports as J. E. Montgomery. He has often had the first name James attributed to him, but McCaul believes that Montgomery's actual first name was Joseph.) The cottonclads were converted civilian vessels with strengthened bows and were lightly protected with cotton as a form of armor. They were faster and more maneuverable than the ironclads, but most were only armed with one or two cannons each. Montgomery and the commanders of his ships held a council of war on May 9, and decided to attack. The plan was to overwhelm the isolated mortar boat and ironclad. After capturing the ironclad, they expected that the larger Union fleet could be surprised and defeated and that the attack could drive as far upriver as Cairo, Illinois and St. Louis, Missouri. The crews of the cottonclads were strengthened by men from M. Jeff Thompson's (a Brigadier General in the Missouri State Guard) land force from the Missouri State Guard. Thompson was present on the cottonclad CSS General Bragg. The various ships were issued written orders, as Montgomery did not believe that his sailors were capable of accurately using signalling methods during battle. The Confederate vessels were arranged with the fastest at the front and the slowest to the rear in order to provide the Union with the minimum amount of reaction time after the ships were spotted.

== Order of battle ==
Fleet	Engaged Ships
Mississippi Flotilla - Union Navy	USS Benton; USS Carondelet; USS Pittsburgh; USS Cincinnati; USS Mound City; USS Cairo; USS St. Louis; Mortar Boat No. 16

Fleet	Engaged Ships
River Defense Service - Confederate	CSS General Bragg; CSS General Sterling Price; CSS General Sumter; CSS General Earl Van Dorn; CSS Little Rebel; CSS General M. Jeff Thompson; CSS Colonel Lovell; CSS General Beauregard

== Battle ==
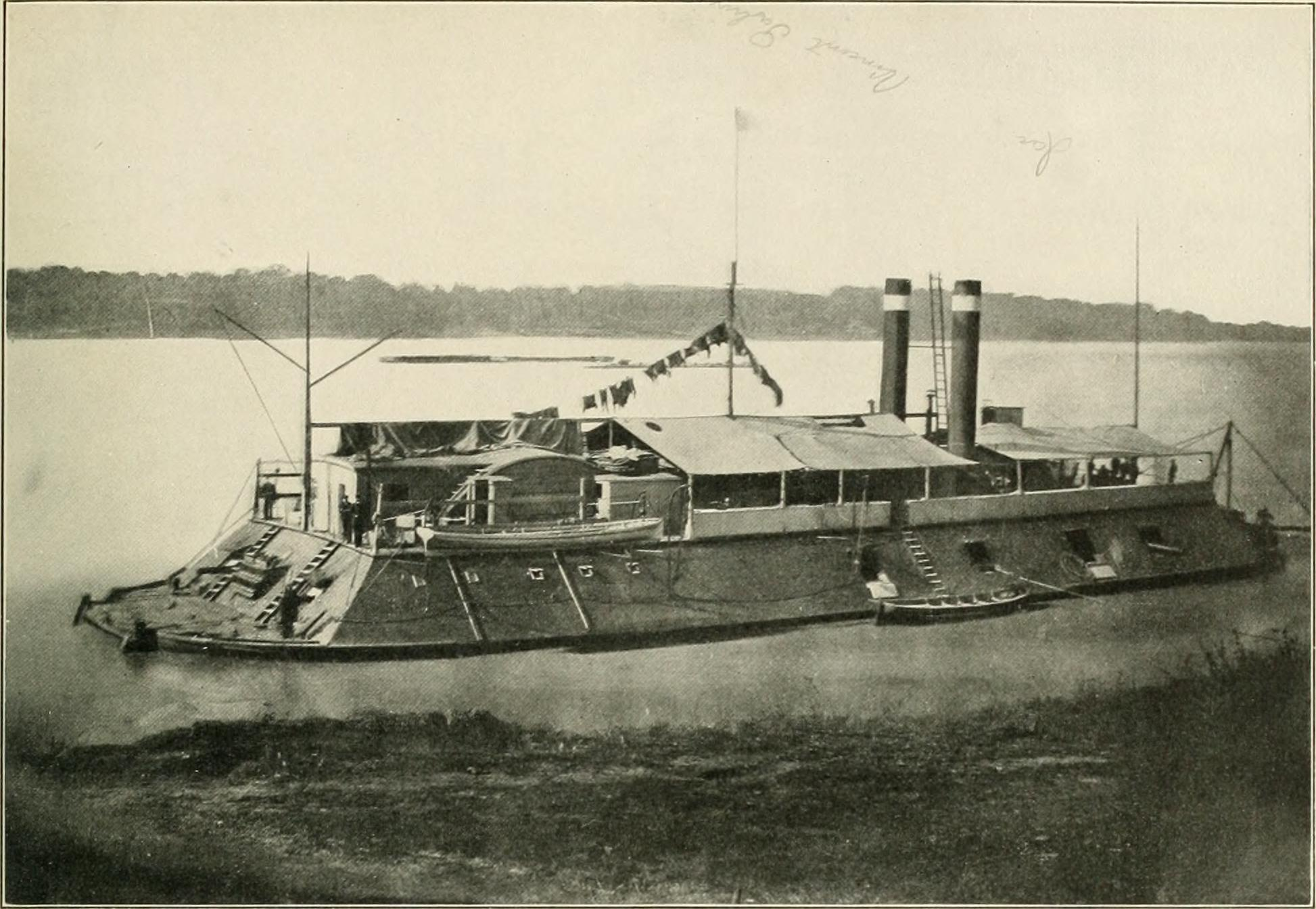
USS Cincinnati, a City-class ironclad, built in 1861.

On the morning of May 10, the two Union ships on bombardment duty were Mortar Boat No. 16 (Note: Also spelled Mortar Boat Sixteen) and Cincinnati. Naval historian Neil P. Chatelain states that the Confederate vessels passed through Plum Point Bend and approached the two Union ships at around 6:30 am, while historian Ed Bearss states that the Confederate advance began at 6:00 am, before rounding Plum Point Bend at 7:25 am. The Union ironclads did not have sufficient steam pressure built up to operate effectively, and the rest of Davis's fleet was 3 miles (4.8 km) upstream. Cincinnati, in particular, was caught by surprise: her crew was performing routine tasks such as holystoning the decks. The vessel cast off her moorings, but steam pressure for her engines had not been maintained, and she was not able to maneuver effectively. General Bragg was the forward Confederate ship, and her commander, Captain W. H. H. Leonard, ordered the ship to be accelerated to ram Cincinnati. The ironclad opened fire on the Confederate vessel. The mortar boat also fired her mortars at the Confederates, although there were no direct hits. General Bragg was still able to ram Cincinnati on the starboard quarter.

The blow left a hole in the side of Cincinnati. However, the ram had struck a glancing blow, and the hole was insufficient to sink the vessel. General Bragg's ram was briefly stuck in the hull of the Union vessel, and Cincinnati was able to fire another volley into the Confederate ship. The collision spun the two ships 180 degrees. More Union fire struck General Bragg while the Confederate vessel was maneuvering back from Cincinnati, and a shot struck the tiller rope of General Bragg. The damage forced the vessel out of the action as she could not be maneuvered. The main Union force had become aware of the attack when Union lookouts spotted the smoke clouds from the Confederate vessels at about 6:00 am or 6:30 am. Carondelet had steam pressure built up in preparation for movement, and Mound City was quickly able to move as well, but Pittsburgh, Benton, Cairo, and St. Louis were unprepared, despite prior orders to keep their steam up.

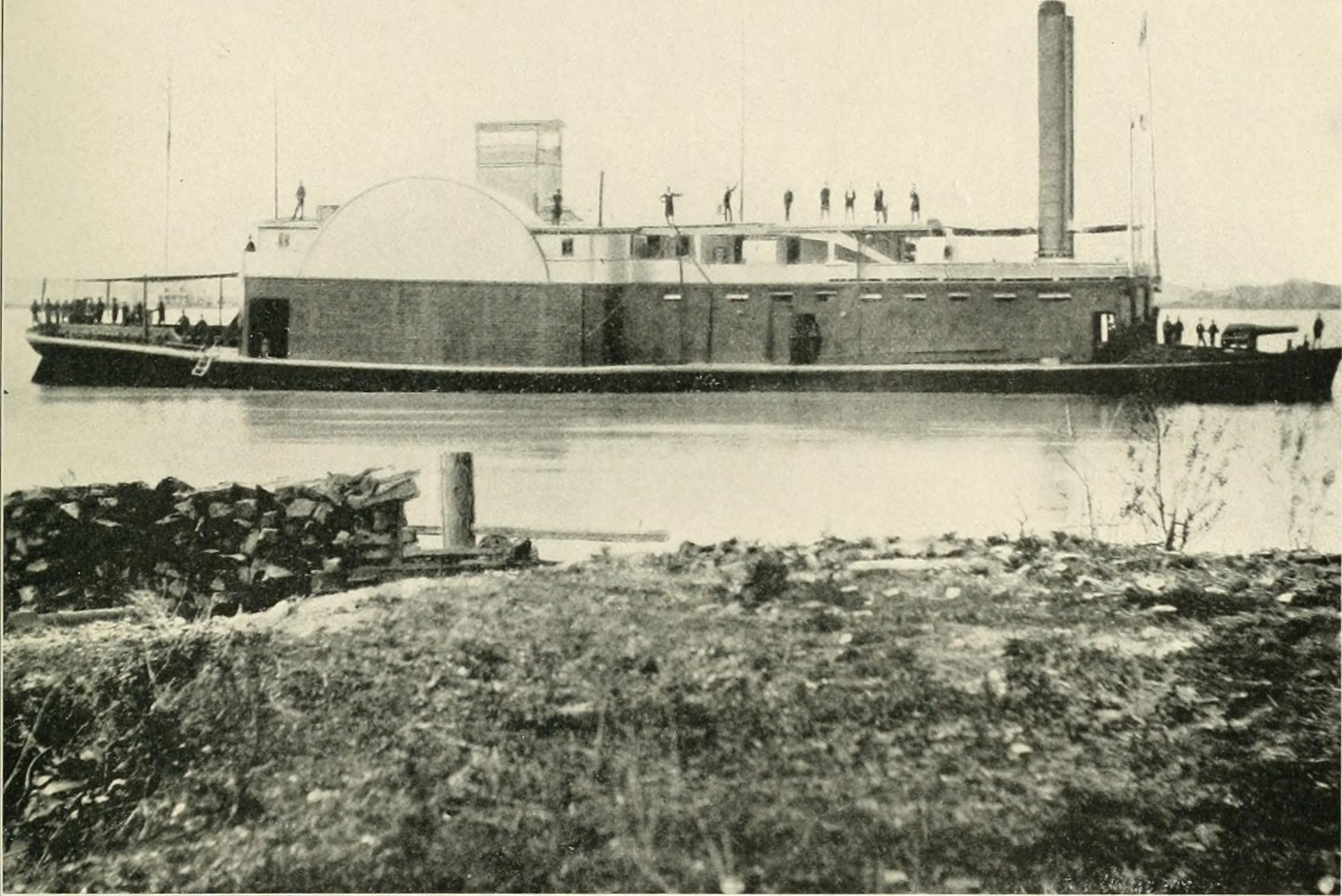
CSS General Sterling Price, converted from a Mississippi steamboat in 1862.

Before Cincinnati could recover from the blow struck by General Bragg, CSS General Sterling Price rammed the ironclad. Cincinnati had her sternpost and rudder destroyed by the blow. The ironclad then swung out of control into an angle that allowed a third Confederate ship, CSS General Sumter, to ram her. The blow struck Cincinnati in the fantail. The commander of General Sumter offered Cincinnati terms of surrender, but was rejected. Water rushed into Cincinnati, putting out the fires for her engines and flooding her magazine. The crew of Cincinnati was sent to the decks, ready to defend against a boarding attempt. Sharpshooters on General Sumter fired on the ironclad, severely wounding her commander, Commander R. N. Stembel. Mound City and Carondelet had arrived at close range after about 10 or 15 minutes, but had been unable to fire for fear of hitting Cincinnati. The situation on Cincinnati had become one of attempting to get her into shallow water before the ship sank. General Sterling Price and General Sumter pulled back from Cincinnati enough that Mound City and Carondelet were able to open fire, and Benton had entered range for supporting fire.

A shot from Carondelet struck General Sterling Price, damaging the supply pipes for her boiler, knocking the Confederate ship out of the fight. CSS General Earl Van Dorn advanced towards Mound City, intending to ram her, all the while firing at the mortar boat, which was hit by two shots. No one aboard the mortar boat was injured. Mound City fired on General Earl Van Dorn, but did little damage. Mound City unsuccessfully moved to avoid getting rammed, but General Earl Van Dorn struck the Union ship. The blow badly damaged the ironclad's bow, almost tearing it off. As a result of the collision, Mound City was pushed aside while General Earl Van Dorn kept going forward; the Confederate vessel briefly ran aground. Mound City was ordered to the west bank of the Mississippi River by her commanding officer, Commander Augustus Kilty. The commander of General Earl Van Dorn, Captain Isaac Fulkerson, was wounded during the action. Fulkerson noticed that his vessel was further upriver than the other Confederate ships and was isolated, so he ordered his vessel to withdraw. Bearss reports CSS Little Rebel attempted to ram Mound City, but was damaged by a shot from Benton and withdrew, but historian Edward B. McCaul argues that no second Confederate ship attempted to ram Mound City and that Benton's commander's account of the incident was not accurate.

At this point, the fighting was largely down to Carondelet and Benton facing off against CSS General M. Jeff Thompson, CSS Colonel Lovell, and CSS General Beauregard. The battle was almost over by the time the three trailing Confederate vessels arrived. The Union vessels had lighter drafts than the Confederate ones, and they entered shallower water where the Confederates could not ram them. Montgomery was aware that the quantity and quality of his ships' cannons were inferior to the Union ironclads, and ordered a withdrawal. Carondelet was forward of the other still-functioning Union ships, and came under fire from the Confederate vessels and accidental undershots from Pittsburgh to the rear.

Benton and Carondelet pursued the retreating Confederate vessels, but broke off before reaching the batteries at Fort Pillow. St. Louis and Pittsburgh arrived on the scene. The former and Cairo attempted to save Mound City, but the latter vessel was intentionally run aground onto a shoal, where she sank. Pittsburgh was aiding Cincinnati in reaching the eastern shore, but before she could do so Cincinnati sank in 11 feet (3.4 m) of water. By the time St. Louis reached the site of the battle, the Confederates had withdrawn. According to Bearss, the fighting lasted about 70 minutes, while McCaul argues for a time frame of 30 to 60 minutes. Of the Union ironclads, only Cincinnati, Mound City, and Carondelet had been involved in close-range fighting, and sailors in the Union fleet criticized Cairo, Pittsburgh, and St. Louis for their minimal roles in the action.

== Aftermath ==
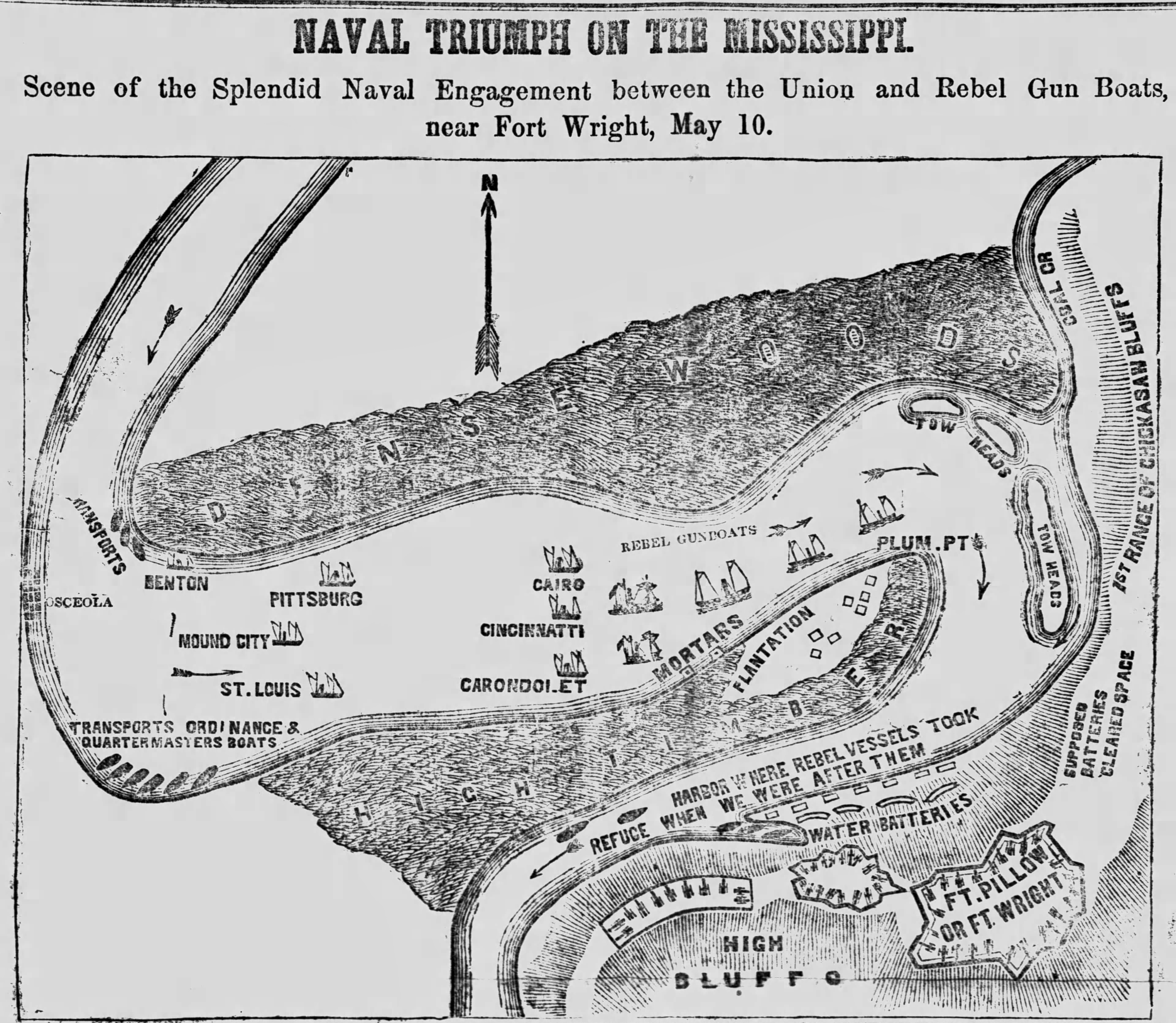
Contemporary map of the engagement, as published in The Philadelphia Inquirer

On the Union side, one sailor was killed and three suffered significant injuries, in addition to some less badly injured men. The Confederates had about a dozen casualties, of whom three were killed. McCaul notes that these losses were very light given the amount of expended ordnance, and suggests that inaccurate smoothbore cannons and projectiles passing through the Confederate ships, instead of exploding within them, caused the low casualty rate. The Union incorrectly believed they had inflicted heavy losses on the Confederates, and their claims about the damage inflicted on opposing ships were greatly overstated. Davis's reporting to the United States Navy Department mentioned these inaccurate claims, although the naval historian Stephen R. Taaffe concludes that Davis was presenting events "in the most positive light" rather than intentionally lying. The Confederate ships were repaired at Fort Pillow after the battle; Thompson compared the appearance of the River Defense Fleet's smokestacks after the battle to nutmeg graters due to the damage they had received. While the superstructures and smokestacks of the Confederate vessels had been damaged, the cotton cladding had protected the ships' machinery. Mound City and Cincinnati were later refloated and repaired, with the former returning to service less than two weeks later, and the latter returning in June.

The loss of two ships led to the Union ironclads being strengthened at the waterline, and Davis changed the operation procedures for the bombardment to increase security. The failure of several of the Union captains to keep their ships at combat readiness was not mentioned in any official reports of the action to avoid impinging any officer's honor. Both sides claimed victory; Bearss describes the action as "sharp but not decisive". Historian James M. McPherson states that the battle was "a definite Confederate victory", historian Mark K. Christ considers the action a Confederate victory, and Chatelain notes that the action was a Confederate tactical victory without long-range strategic benefits. Bearss notes that the battle was one of very few fleet actions during the war, and states that "it was the only one in which the Confederates felt that they were sufficiently prepared to take the offensive". Historians Paul Calore and Myron J. Smith refer to the battle as the first fleet action of the war.

The fighting at Plum Point Bend did not stop the bombardment of Fort Pillow, although no Union land forces were available to assist in the campaign against the fort. On May 30, Confederate forces abandoned Corinth, Mississippi, in the face of a Union army, making the position at Fort Pillow untenable as it was supplied through Corinth. Fort Pillow was abandoned on June 4, with the land garrison withdrawing to Vicksburg, Mississippi, and Grenada, Mississippi. The River Defense Fleet fell back to Memphis. Reinforced by the United States Ram Fleet, Davis moved his fleet towards Memphis in pursuit. With his ships low on fuel, Montgomery held a council of war that decided to fight the Union fleet. In the following First Battle of Memphis, all of the ships of the River Defense Fleet except General Earl Van Dorn were sunk or captured. Union forces took control of the entire course of the river in July 1863, after the ends of the Siege of Vicksburg and Siege of Port Hudson. The course of the Mississippi River has changed since the battle, and the old river channel where the battle took place is now a lake near Fort Pillow State Historic Park. It is near the site of modern Osceola, Arkansas.
