= CSS General Earl Van Dorn =

1862 American Confederate warship

Coordinates: 32°42′36″N 90°31′07″W

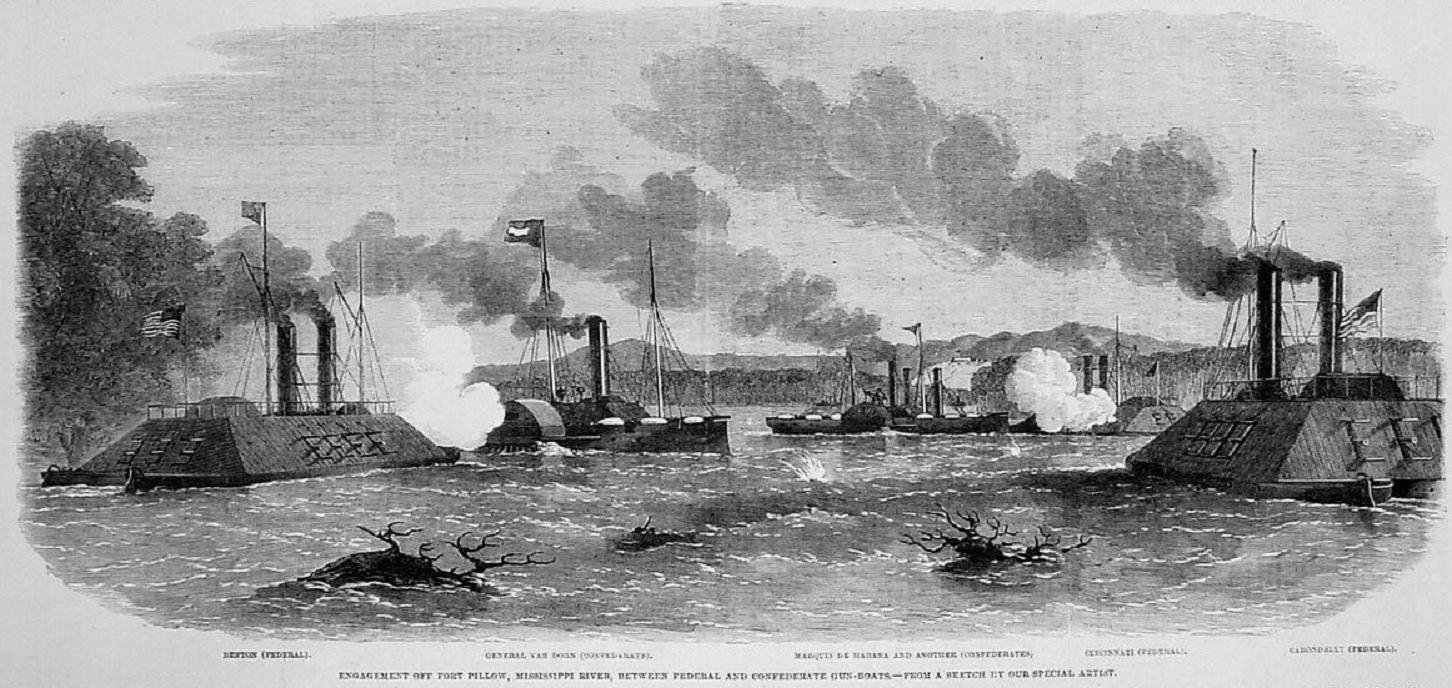
- An 1862 depiction of the Battle of Plum Point Bend; General Earl Van Dorn is the second vessel from the left (Note: This artist's impression shows the Marquis de Habana [sic] as being present at the battle. Marquis de la Habana was the civilian name of a steamer that became the warship CSS McRae; which left Fort Pillow in April and sank on April 28.)

History

Confederate States
- Name: General Earl Van Dorn
- Namesake: Earl Van Dorn
- Operator: Confederate States Army
- Completed: April 10, 1862
- Acquired: 1862
- Fate: Burned to avoid capture, June 26, 1862

General characteristics
- Type: Sidewheel steamer
- Length: 182 feet (55 m)
- Beam: 28 feet 3 inches (8.61 m)
- Depth: 10 feet 7 inches (3.23 m)
- Armament: 1 32-pounder cannon
- Armor: Cottonclad warship

Service record
- Part of: River Defense Fleet
- Operations: Battle of Plum Point Bend; First Battle of Memphis

CSS General Earl Van Dorn was a cottonclad warship that was used by the Confederate States of America during the American Civil War. She was purchased for Confederate service in New Orleans, Louisiana, in early 1862 to serve with the River Defense Fleet in the war's Western theater. She was converted into a cottonclad warship by installing an iron-covered framework of timbers on her bow that served as a ram, and protecting her machinery with timber bulkheads packed with cotton. A sidewheel steamer, she was 182 feet (55 m) long and was armed with a single 32-pounder cannon on the bow.

Having been assigned to defend the northern stretches of the Confederate-held portion of the Mississippi River, General Earl Van Dorn left New Orleans in late March 1862 and arrived at Memphis, Tennessee, early the next month. On May 10, she fought with the River Defense Fleet against the Union Navy in the Battle of Plum Point Bend, where she rammed and sank the ironclad USS Mound City. On June 6, General Earl Van Dorn was the only vessel of the River Defense Fleet to escape destruction or capture at the First Battle of Memphis. After withdrawing up the Yazoo River to Liverpool Landing, Mississippi, General Earl Van Dorn, along with two other Confederate warships, was burnt by the Confederates to prevent her capture by approaching Union vessels.

== Service history ==
=== Purchase and conversion ===
In 1862, the Confederate States of America purchased 14 civilian vessels in New Orleans, Louisiana, for conversion into military ships. These became the River Defense Fleet, which was commanded by Captain J. E. Montgomery. (Note: Montgomery signed his reports as J. E. Montgomery. He has often had the first name James attributed to him, but McCaul believes that Montgomery's actual first name was Joseph.) The ships were intended to defend the Confederate-held part of the Mississippi River. The fleet was operated by the Confederate States Army. To emphasize that this force was distinct from the Confederate States Navy, many of the vessels were named after army officers. Some Confederate naval officers believed that purchasing and converting these vessels was a waste of resources that should have been focused on ironclads or other existing vessels. Several sources state that the vessel that became General Earl Van Dorn was previously known as Junius Beebe; others state that Junius Beebe instead became CSS General Sumter. General Earl Van Dorn was a sidewheel steamer. She measured 182 feet (55 m) in length, and had similar dimensions to General Sumter, with a beam of 28 feet 3 inches (8.61 m), and a depth of hold 10-foot-7-inch (3.23 m). She was named after Earl Van Dorn, the Confederate commander at the Battle of Pea Ridge.

The vessels of the River Defense Fleet were intended to be used as rams, and they were known as cottonclad warships. Their conversion into warships involved the addition of 1 inch (2.5 cm) of iron plating to the bow, backed by 4 inches (10 cm) of oak planking on a framework of 1 square foot (0.093 m^{2}) timbers. The engines and boilers were protected by an inner bulkhead of one-foot-square timbers with an outer bulkhead of 6 by 12 inches (15 cm × 30 cm) timbers. In between the bulkheads was cotton. General Earl Van Dorn's armament consisted of a single 32-pounder cannon on her bow, which was a common naval gun that was smoothbore and muzzleloading. General Earl Van Dorn was placed under the command of Captain Isaac Fulkerson. Competing strategic goals had led to a split of the River Defense Fleet. The Confederate States War Department desired that the ships serve in the Tennessee, Kentucky, and Missouri area to protect this portion of the Mississippi River, but local interests pushed for the ships to remain at New Orleans. Rather than sending all of the ships upriver, the Confederate commander at New Orleans, Major General Mansfield Lovell, retained part of the fleet at New Orleans after a river barrier defending New Orleans failed. General Earl Van Dorn left New Orleans on March 25, and reached Memphis, Tennessee, on April 3. A week later, her cottonclad conversion was completed with the finishing of the ironwork. She was sent to Fort Pillow along with CSS General Sterling Price and CSS General Bragg.

=== Plum Point Bend and Memphis ===
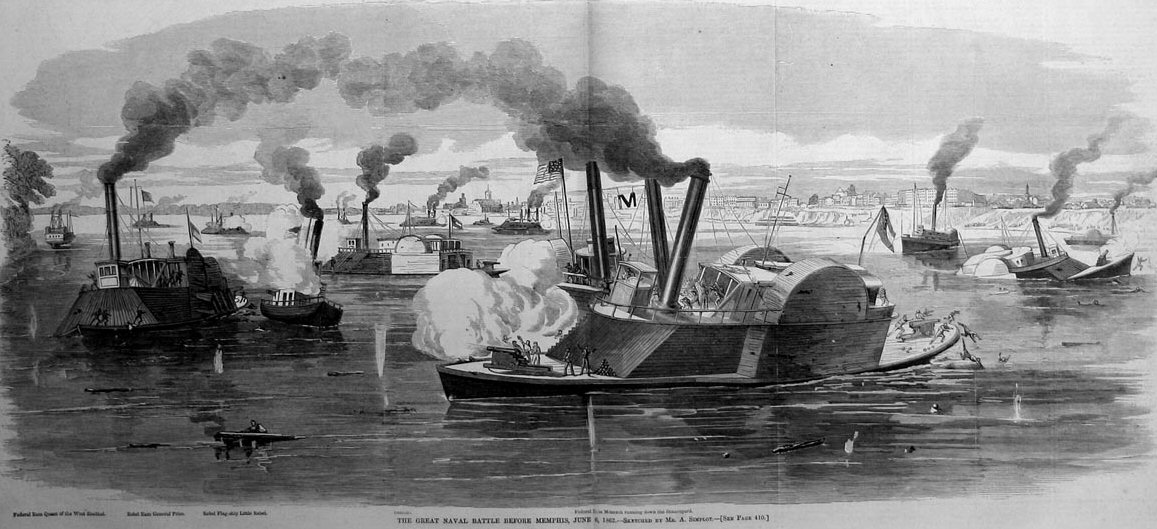
The destruction of the Confederate fleet at the First Battle of Memphis

General Earl Van Dorn was present on the morning of April 13, when the Confederates made an abortive attempt at a surprise attack against Union Navy ships upriver from Fort Pillow. The Union fleet had established a pattern of stationing one mortar boat downriver guarded by one ironclad, and Montgomery decided to attack with the eight ships he had at Fort Pillow, doing so on May 10, 1862. The resulting engagement became known as the Battle of Plum Point Bend. Seven of the Confederate vessels involved were arranged in order of speed, with the fastest vessels at the front; General Earl Van Dorn was fourth in the column. She fired on the Union mortar boat during the attack, hitting it twice, before ramming the Union ironclad USS Mound City. The Union ship was struck on her starboard side near the bow and severely damaged. General Earl Van Dorn then ran aground and came under Union fire. The Union fire caused minimal damage, although Fulkerson was wounded and one sailor was killed. After General Earl Van Dorn was freed, she rejoined the rest of the Confederate fleet. The Confederates broke off the engagement when other Union ironclads arrived on the scene; Mound City and the ironclad USS Cincinnati had been sunk but were later salvaged and rejoined the Union fleet.

The Confederates abandoned Fort Pillow in early June after they were defeated at the Siege of Corinth, and General Earl Van Dorn and the other Confederate vessels helped cover the withdrawal. Montgomery's ships reached Memphis on June 5, but there was a shortage of coal for their fuel. At a council of war, Montgomery and his captains decided to fight the pursuing Union forces rather than scuttle their ships and retreat overland with the army, or scuttle a portion of the fleet and use the remaining coal to escape with the rest. Montgomery arranged his ships in three rows of two vessels with General Sterling Price in the rear and CSS Little Rebel not having an assigned position. General Earl Van Dorn was in the third row along with General Bragg. The Union had five ironclads as well as the United States Ram Fleet consisting of four rams. On the morning of June 6, the Union forces attacked, bringing on the First Battle of Memphis. General Earl Van Dorn and General Bragg attempted to escape after the rest of the Confederate fleet was destroyed or captured. The heavy guns of the ironclads and the ramming tactics of the United States Ram Fleet were decisive at Memphis.

The cotton cladding on General Bragg caught fire and she was abandoned. Two of the rams, USS Switzerland and USS Monarch, pursued General Earl Van Dorn and the supply ship Paul Jones, but the Confederate vessels escaped. The historian Mark K. Christ and the Dictionary of American Naval Fighting Ships attribute General Earl Van Dorn's escape to her "superior speed". Fulkerson took General Earl Van Dorn up the Yazoo River. On the Yazoo River, General Earl Van Dorn along with CSS General Polk and CSS Livingston took up a position at Liverpool Landing, Mississippi, where they defended a log barrier designed to protect the construction of the ironclad CSS Arkansas upriver at Yazoo City, Mississippi. On June 26, Monarch and the ram USS Lancaster advanced up the Yazoo River. The Confederate commander at Liverpool Landing ordered General Earl Van Dorn, General Polk, and Livingston burned to prevent their capture. By the time Arkansas, which was on a trial cruise, arrived, it was too late to save the three ships. The wreckage was removed by the United States Army Corps of Engineers in 1878 and 1879.

== Sources ==
- Calore, Paul (2002). Naval Campaigns of the Civil War. Jefferson, North Carolina: McFarland & Company. ISBN 978-0-7864-1217-4.
- Canney, Donald L. (2015). The Confederate Steam Navy 1861–1865. Atglen, Pennsylvania: Schiffer. ISBN 978-0-7643-4824-2.
- Chatelain, Neil P. (2020). Defending the Arteries of Rebellion: Confederate Naval Operations in the Mississippi River Valley, 1861–1865. El Dorado Hills, California: Savas Beatie. ISBN 978-1-61121-510-6.
- Gaines, W. Craig (2008). Encyclopedia of Civil War Shipwrecks. Baton Rouge, Louisiana: Louisiana State University Press. ISBN 978-0-8071-3274-6.
- McCaul, Edward B. Jr (2014). To Retain Command of the Mississippi: The Civil War Naval Campaign for Memphis. Knoxville, Tennessee: University of Tennessee Press. ISBN 978-1-62190-135-8.
- Silverstone, Paul H. (2006). Civil War Navies, 1855–1883. New York, New York: Routledge. ISBN 978-0-415-97870-5.
