= CSS General Beauregard =

Confederate Navy ship

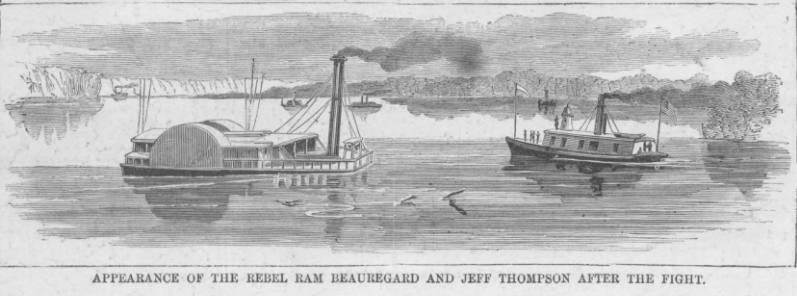
- General Beauregard and CSS General M. Jeff Thompson after the First Battle of Memphis; General Beauregard is shown partially sunk to the left and M. Jeff Thompson is obscured by the smoke cloud at the right.

History

Confederate States
- Name: General Beauregard
- Namesake: General P.G.T. Beauregard
- Launched: 1847
- Acquired: January 1862
- In service: April 5, 1862
- Fate: Sunk during First Battle of Memphis, June 6, 1862

General characteristics
- Type: Towboat (civilian use) Cottonclad ram (military use)
- Tonnage: 454 tons
- Length: 161 feet 10 inches (49.33 m)
- Beam: 30 feet (9.1 m)
- Draft: 10 feet (3.0 m)
- Propulsion: Sidewheel steamer
- Armament: Disputed

CSS General Beauregard was a cottonclad ram operated by the Confederate States Army as part of the River Defense Fleet during the American Civil War. Built in 1847 as the sidewheel towboat Ocean, the vessel was operated by the Ocean Towboat Company and the Union Towboat Company until the Confederacy acquired her in early 1862. Ocean was converted into a cottonclad by the Confederates and renamed after P. G. T. Beauregard. This process was completed on April 5, 1862, after which General Beauregard was sent up the Mississippi River. On May 10, General Beauregard arrived at the end of the Battle of Plum Point Bend. The Confederates abandoned Fort Pillow on June 4, after which the River Defense Fleet vessels present there withdrew to Memphis, Tennessee. The River Defense Fleet made a fighting stand against the Union Navy at the First Battle of Memphis on June 6. During the battle, General Beauregard attempted to ram the Union ram Monarch but missed and collided with CSS General Sterling Price, taking off one of the struck ship's paddle wheels. General Beauregard fired a shot at the ironclad USS Benton and missed; return fire from Benton caused a boiler explosion which sunk General Beauregard.

== Service history ==
=== Civilian career and Confederate acquisition ===
The sidewheel steamer Ocean was built in Algiers, New Orleans Louisiana in 1847, for use as a towboat. The ship, which was owned by the Ocean Towboat Company and then the Union Towboat Company, continued in civilian service until the American Civil War. She had a length of 161 feet 10 inches (49.33 m), a beam of 30 feet (9.1 m), a draft of 10 feet (3.0 m), and tonnage of 454 tons. The towboat had two funnels.

With the Civil War ongoing, the Confederate authorities acquired 14 vessels for the defense of the Mississippi River in January 1862, under the authority of Major General Mansfield Lovell. These vessels were operated by the Confederate States Army, rather than the Confederate States Navy, as the River Defense Fleet. The civilian steamboats acquired for the River Defense Fleet were converted into rams by adding wooden planking and a 1-inch (2.5 cm) thick iron casing to their bows. Timber bulkheads filled with compressed cotton were added as protection for the ships' boilers and engines. The converted vessels were known as cottonclads. Ocean was renamed General Beauregard by the Confederates, after P. G. T. Beauregard. While period depictions of the River Defense Fleet vessels tend to be inaccurate, an illustration of General Beauregard in Confederate service shows her with a slanted and armored forward bulkhead and vertical side bulkheads, along with a single cannon each on the deck at the bow and stern. General Beauregard was included in three drawings by Alexander Simplot which were published in Harper's Weekly in 1862.

=== Confederate service ===
The process of converting General Beauregard into a cottonclad was completed on April 5, and was placed under the command of veteran riverboat pilot Captain James H. Hurt, whose name is spelled in multiple ways in the Official Records of the Union and Confederate Navies. Other officers assigned to the ship were First Officer Robert D. Court and Chief Engineer Joseph Swift. Of the 14 ships purchased for the fleet, six were retained for the defense of New Orleans, Louisiana, with the remaining eight sent up the Mississippi River. The naval historian Donald L. Canney notes claims that General Beauregard was armed with five cannons (four 8-inch pieces and a 42-pounder), but the historian Edward B. McCaul notes that the eight River Defense Fleet vessels sent upriver combined for only two cannons, one of which was a 32-pounder smoothbore and the other a 24-pounder smoothbore. McCaul states that the unarmed vessels were each armed with an army-provided 32-pounder gun after reaching Fort Pillow; General Beauregard was one of four vessels later provided with an 8-inch piece from Fort Pillow when the Confederates abandoned the fort.

Fort Pillow was under bombardment by a Union Navy force under the command of Captain Charles Henry Davis. Davis's vessels had fallen into the routine of having a single mortar boat bombard the fort each day while escorted by a single ironclad, with the rest of the Union fleet staying upriver. The Confederate naval commander at Fort Pillow, Captain James Montgomery (Note: Captain Montgomery's first name was possibly Joseph), decided to attack the Union force. For the Confederate attack, the ships (except for the flagship CSS Little Rebel) were arranged in order of speed, which left General Beauregard third from last. In the May 10 battle, known as the Battle of Plum Point Bend, two Union ironclads were rammed and sunk, but General Beauregard did not reach the site of the battle until it was almost over. While the crew of General Beauregard fired the ship's guns during the battle, the vessel did not ram any Union ships.

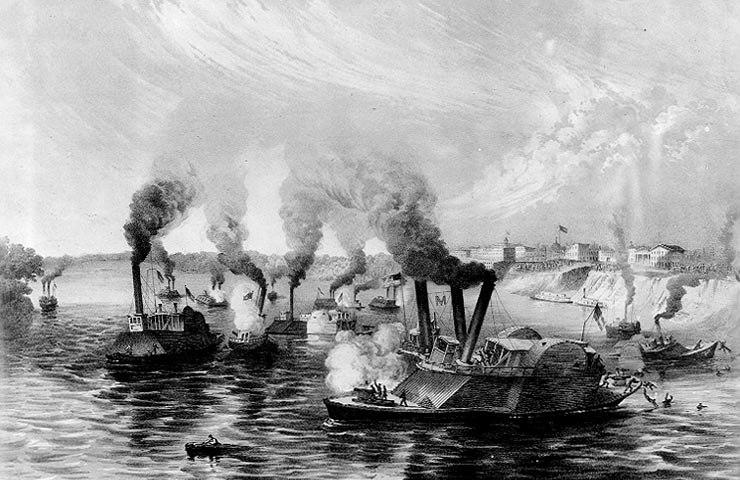
General Beauregard (center right) being rammed by the Monarch while other Confederate ships sink, burn, or run aground in the First Battle of Memphis.

The Confederates abandoned Fort Pillow on June 4, and the River Defense Fleet withdrew downriver to Memphis, Tennessee. On the night of June 5/6, Montgomery and his captains decided at a council of war to stay and fight the approaching Union fleet instead of withdrawing. Davis's ironclads had been reinforced by the United States Ram Fleet. On June 6, the Union forces reached Memphis, bringing on the First Battle of Memphis. Montgomery again assigned positions in his fleet's alignment for all vessels except for Little Rebel, with the other Confederate ships being arrayed in four successive rows of two ships. General Beauregard was the left ship in the second row, next to CSS General Sumter. During the battle, General Beauregard and CSS General Sterling Price both attempted to ram USS Monarch (one of the Union rams) but both Confederate ships missed. General Beauregard instead struck General Price, taking the port paddle wheel off of General Price.

One of the cannons on General Beauregard was fired at the ironclad USS Benton but missed; Benton's return fire caused the Confederate ship's boiler to explode. Fourteen scalded Confederates from General Beauregard were captured by Union forces. Canney states that many of her crew were killed by the boiler explosion, while the naval historian W. Craig Gaines states that only one crewman was killed and three wounded. The Dictionary of American Naval Fighting Ships states that Monarch captured more survivors from General Beauregard and towed the sinking Confederate ships towards the Arkansas shore of the river, while General Beauregard's captain, who escaped capture, claimed that General Beauregard "floated down the river about one-fourth of a mile, and sunk in twenty feet water, face to the enemy, and colors flying". Only one of the River Defense Fleet vessels escaped the battle at Memphis; while some of the others were salvaged and taken into Union service, the wreck of General Beauregard was too badly damaged for this.

== Sources ==
- Canney, Donald L. (2015). The Confederate Steam Navy 1861–1865. Atglen, Pennsylvania: Schiffer. ISBN 978-0-7643-4824-2.
- Chatelain, Neil P. (2020). Defending the Arteries of Rebellion: Confederate Naval Operations in the Mississippi River Valley, 1861–1865. El Dorado Hills, California: Savas Beatie. ISBN 978-1-61121-510-6.
- Gaines, W. Craig (2008). Encyclopedia of Civil War Shipwrecks. Baton Rouge, Louisiana: Louisiana State University Press. ISBN 978-0-8071-3274-6.
- McCaul, Edward B. Jr (2014). To Retain Command of the Mississippi: The Civil War Naval Campaign for Memphis. Knoxville, Tennessee: University of Tennessee Press. ISBN 978-1-62190-135-8.
- Tomblin, Barbara Brooks (2016). The Civil War on the Mississippi: Union Sailors, Gunboat Captains, and the Campaign to Control the River. Lexington, Kentucky: University Press of Kentucky. ISBN 978-0-8131-6704-6.
