= River Defense Fleet =

River Defense Fleet Confederate State of America
- Active: March to June 1862
- Country: Confederate States of America
- Branch: Army (see article)
- Engagements: Battle of Forts Jackson and St. Philip; Battle of Plum Point Bend; First Battle of Memphis

The River Defense Fleet was a set of fourteen vessels in Confederate service, intended to assist in the defense of New Orleans in the early days of the American Civil War. All were merchant ships or towboats that were seized by order of the War Department in Richmond and converted into warships by arming each with one or two guns, protecting their engines by an interior bulkhead, and strengthening their bows so they could be used as rams. Although they were nominally a part of the Confederate States Army, all of their officers and most of their crews were civilians. A portion of the fleet was retained in the southern part of the Mississippi River, and a portion was sent north to defend against Union movement from the north.

The portion of the fleet in the south took part in the battles at Forts Jackson and St. Philip. The portion of the fleet in the north took part in the battles at Plum Point Bend and Memphis. Experience showed that they could stand up to the opposing Union vessels only under very special circumstances; when those conditions were not met, they were overwhelmed. By the middle of 1862, the entire fleet had been eradicated, either by enemy action or at their own hands.

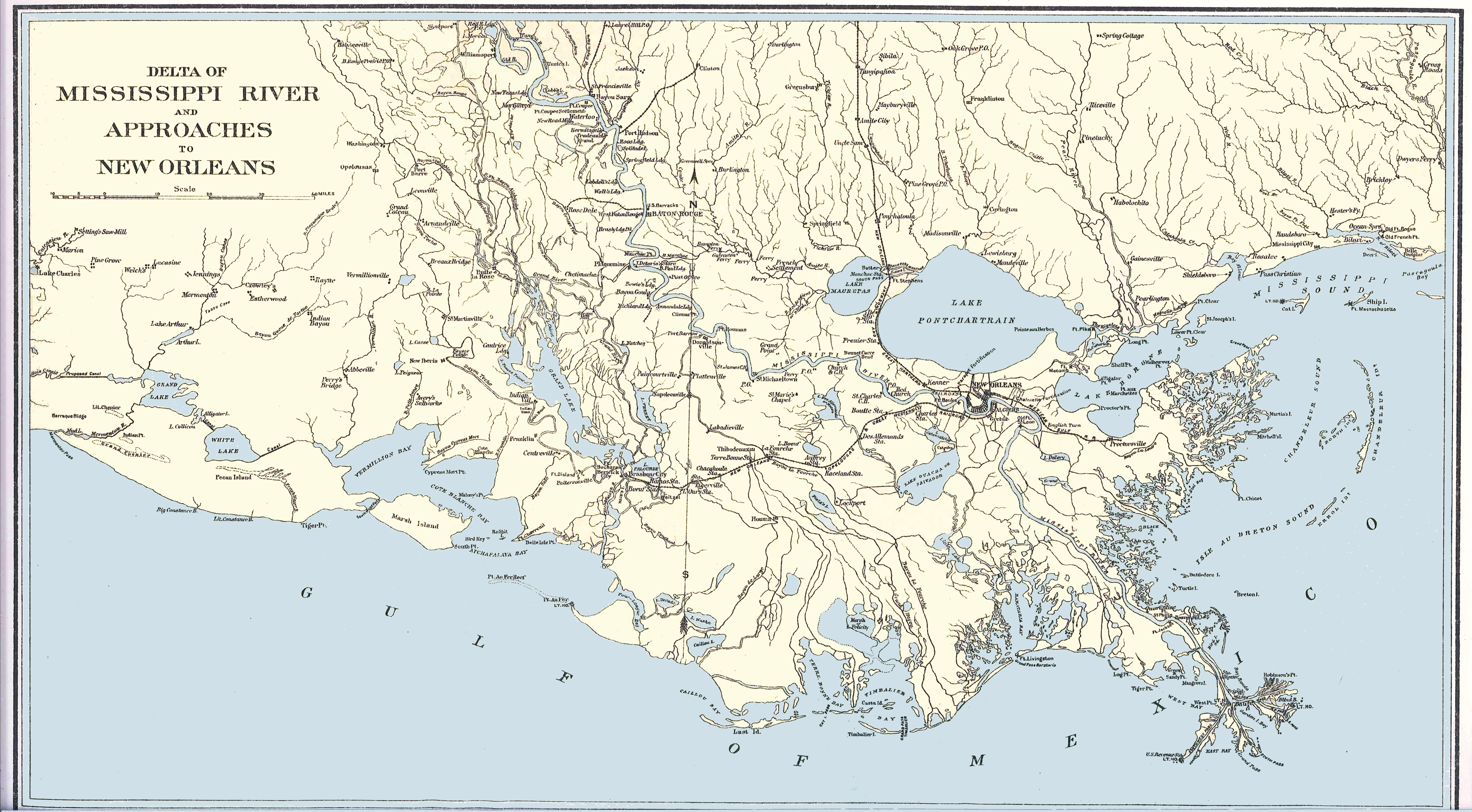
Map depicting Louisiana and the Lower Mississippi during the time of the Civil War.

== Origin of the River Defense Fleet ==
Immediately after the outbreak of the Civil War in April 1861, the seceded states had to confront the blockade against their ports that was proclaimed by President Abraham Lincoln. They also had to consider the threat posed by Union General-in-Chief Winfield Scott's Anaconda Plan, which envisioned a thrust down the Mississippi that would culminate in the conquest of New Orleans. Although the Anaconda was never formally adopted as a basis for Federal strategy (in fact, it was more or less explicitly rejected by Scott's successors), its mere existence reminded Confederate President Jefferson Davis and his government of the importance of the Mississippi River. Many citizens, both in and out of the government, brought forth suggestions for its defense. Among them was the brainchild of a pair of riverboat captains, James E. Montgomery and J. H. Townsend.

The proposal put forth by the two captains was to utilize ships with appropriate characteristics of size and speed, converting them into rams by strengthening their bows with strips of railroad iron. Their machinery was to be protected by internal bulkheads. They would be lightly armed, only one or two guns apiece according to the wishes of their captains, as they would not be expected to slug it out with the armored gunboats then being built for the Union. Instead, they were to rely on ramming, to hit the slow enemy gunboats where they were most vulnerable. The captains would be selected by Montgomery and Townsend from among the experienced rivermen at New Orleans, and each captain would subsequently hire his crew.

Bypassing the War and Navy Departments in Richmond, Montgomery, and Townsend, had their scheme endorsed by the entire Mississippi delegation to the Confederate Congress, and also by Major General Leonidas Polk, who was a personal favorite of President Davis. Their political method was proven effective when Congress approved their plan, appropriating $1,000,000 even before Townsend had returned to New Orleans to supervise the conversions.

== Conversion of the merchant vessels ==
Following the enactment of the appropriation bill, Secretary of War Judah P. Benjamin sent a telegram to Major General Mansfield Lovell, commandant of the military department that included New Orleans, instructing him to seize fourteen steamers for war purposes. This was the first association of General Lovell with the River Defense Fleet; he was soon to become the fleet's most persistent and severe critic. He immediately objected to the irregular nature of the fleet, delivering the prescient remark, "Fourteen Mississippi River captains and pilots will never agree about anything once they get underway." In obedience to the order, he took possession of fourteen steamers in the name of the government. Some of the original fourteen were swapped for others as Lovell became more familiar with the intention of the War Department, but in the end, the fleet still consisted of fourteen vessels.

Each vessel was modified by strengthening her bow by filling the interior with solid oak, planking over the forward 20 feet (6.1 meters) with oak sheathing, and covering the sheath with railroad iron 1 inch (25 millimeters) thick. The engines were protected by a double bulkhead. The inner bulkhead was made of pine beams 12 inches (30 centimeters) square, the outer of beams 6 by 12 inches (15 by 30 centimeters). The outer bulkhead was plated over with railroad iron like that on the bow, 1 inch (25 millimeters) thick. The space between the bulkheads, 22 inches (56 centimeters), was packed with compressed cotton. Although the cotton was the least important part of the armor, it caught the public fancy, and the vessels that received this kind of armor came to be called "cottonclads."

The conversion process for the cottonclads reached completion in the month of 16 March to 17 April 1862, which was coincidentally just the time that the Union fleet under Flag Officer David Glasgow Farragut began its buildup in the lower river, as they prepared for the attack on New Orleans. Although the finished rams were supposed to be sent up the river to aid in the defense of Island Number 10 and Memphis, Lovell persuaded the War Department to let him retain the first six in the vicinity of New Orleans. In the order of their completion, the six were: Stonewall Jackson, Warrior, Defiance, Resolute, General Breckinridge, and General Lovell. By this time, Captain Townsend was no longer associated with the fleet. As Captain Montgomery went with the northern section, another riverboat captain, John A. Stephenson (sometimes spelt Stevenson), was chosen for overall command of the six New Orleans vessels. The remaining eight, all sent to Memphis, were General Bragg, General Sterling Price, General Earl Van Dorn, Colonel Lovell, General Beauregard, General M. Jeff Thompson, Little Rebel, and General Sumter. The last was completed on 17 April, the day before the anticipated bombardment of Fort Jackson and Fort St. Philip began.

Because they were expected to be used primarily as rams, the armament of the fleet was minimal, amounting to only one or two guns on each. Furthermore, their captains would not devote time to gun practice. This led to another command anomaly, as artillerymen from the Army were assigned to work the guns on the rams, but remained subject to the orders of Army officers.

== The River Defense Fleet ==
=== The Battle of Forts Jackson and St. Philip ===
Union fleet passing the forts, 28 April 1862.

Three separate commands operated on the Mississippi near New Orleans. One was the Confederate States Navy, at that time led by Commander John K. Mitchell. Another was the Louisiana state navy. The third was the River Defense Fleet. On 20 April 1862, after the bombardment of Fort Jackson and Fort St. Philip had begun, General Lovell tried to rationalize the command situation by ordering that henceforth everything afloat would be subject to the orders of Commander Mitchell. The order was met with a flat refusal by Captain Stephenson, who argued that "[every] officer and man on the river defense expedition joined it on the condition that it was to be independent of the Navy." This act of apparent mutiny could not be punished because of the peculiar relation of the fleet to the Army.

On the night of 24 April, Farragut's fleet made its historic run past the Mississippi River forts that defended New Orleans from the south. Because the Rebel leaders had not coordinated the responsibilities of the forts and the associated river fleet, the action was divided into two independent parts. Each ship of the attacking column was past the forts before she had to contend with the defending Confederate vessels, which therefore received the undivided attention of the Yankee gunners when they met. Under the circumstances, only one of the River Defense Fleet managed to close with the enemy: Stonewall Jackson was able to ram USS Varuna while that unfortunate gunboat was simultaneously being rammed by Governor Moore of the Louisiana Navy. Varuna sank, the only Federal ship lost that night. Stonewall Jackson did not escape unscathed. Holed by shots from other Federal ships assisting Varuna and unable to reply, she was run ashore by her crew, where they abandoned her and set her afire.

Of the remaining five members of the fleet, one (Warrior) was destroyed by a broadside from USS Brooklyn. Resolute was run ashore and abandoned by her crew. Ten men from CSS McRae boarded her but were unable to get her off, so they burned her. General Breckinridge and General Lovell were abandoned and burned by their crews. Only Defiance escaped unharmed; she fled to New Orleans, where her crew left her, and her captain turned her over to Commander Mitchell. Unable to do anything else, Mitchell ordered her to be burned in the general destruction of Confederate property when the city fell.

=== The Battle of Plum Point Bend ===
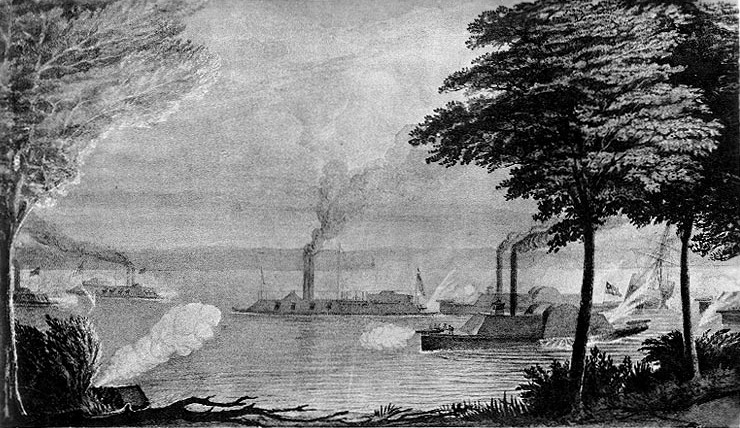
Battle of Plum Point Bend, 10 May 1862.

Although the New Orleans section of the River Defense Fleet was wiped out, the eight vessels in the northern section were able to gain a measure of redemption if not revenge on 10 May 1862, when they surprised the Union Western Gunboat Flotilla in a small action near Plum Point Bend on the Mississippi, a short distance above Fort Pillow. The battle took place about 40 miles (64 kilometers) north of Memphis as the crow flies, but more like 50 miles (80 kilometers) on the river. The Federal flotilla was scattered, with a single gunboat and mortar raft in an exposed position and away from support by the rest of the gunboats. Despite the knowledge that the Rebel ram fleet was nearby, the Yankees failed to send out picket boats. They, therefore, had no warning that the enemy fleet was on the way until they saw their smoke over the trees of Plum Point.

Caught unprepared, the gunboats of the flotilla got up steam and entered the battle one at a time. This allowed the rams to concentrate on each opposing vessel as she came on the scene. Suffering the effects of multiple collisions, USS Cincinnati and Mound City had to be grounded in shoal water to keep them from sinking. By this time, the other gunboats of the flotilla had got up steam and were entering the fray, so Captain Montgomery withdrew his fleet. They escaped with only slight damage.

Because Montgomery did not state his aims in the action, it is difficult to evaluate the magnitude of the Rebel victory. While disabling two gunboats was a signal accomplishment, neither was lost for long. Within a few weeks, both had been raised, repaired, and restored to service. At best, therefore, the fleet had delayed the Federal timetable by a short time.

=== The Battle of Memphis ===
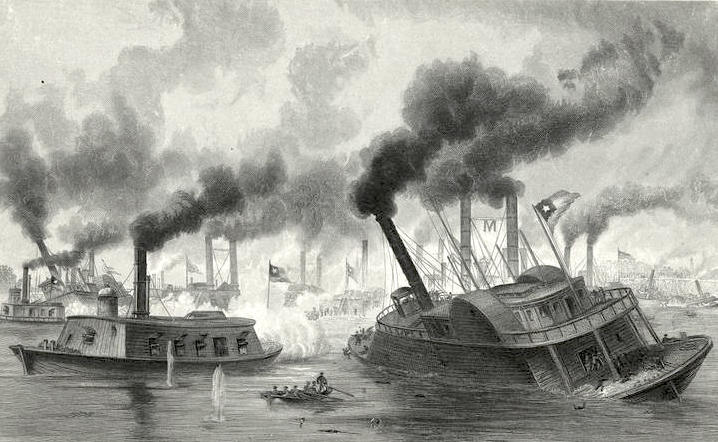
Naval Battle of Memphis, 6 June 1862.

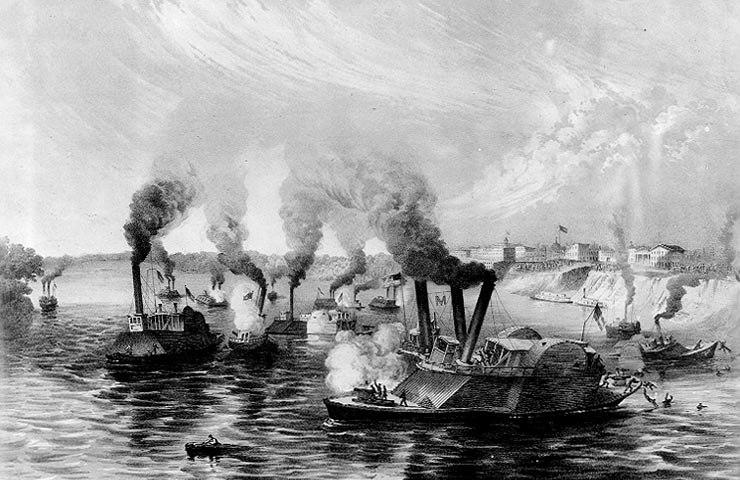
The Total Annihilation of the Rebel Fleet by the Federal Fleet under Commodore Davis. On the Morning of June 6, 1862, off Memphis, Tenn., CSS General Beauregard (center foreground) is being rammed by the federal ram Monarch. At left are the disabled federal ram Queen of the West and the Confederate ships General Sterling Price and Little Rebel.

Less than a month after the engagement at Plum Point, the River Defense Fleet was again in action against the Western Gunboat Flotilla, but conditions were far from the same. One change may or may not have had a significant effect on the battle. The strange divided command system of the fleet, in which the guns were manned by artillerymen who were not part of the crews, unraveled in the face of mounting Confederate losses that affected morale adversely. Tensions between the gunners and rivermen continued to grow, and on at least one occasion, the soldiers refused to join the fleet on a routine mission. Finally, on 5 June 1862, Brigadier General M. Jeff Thompson removed his men. This would certainly have been serious if the rams had been intended to rely on their guns. As it was, the departure of the soldiers affected the fleet only marginally, although it certainly did not help.

The very next morning (6 June), the Federal flotilla was unified and ready to meet its opponents. Furthermore, it was joined by a pair of Union rams from the United States Ram Fleet, which mirrored in many ways the Confederate force, including faulty organization. The fleet had little choice but to give battle at Memphis, although they did not enjoy the local superiority in numbers that they had had at Plum Point.

The battle was a melee, largely because confusing chains of command on both sides made it a series of uncoordinated clashes between opposing rams, while those on the Confederate side were also exposed to the gunfire of the Federal flotilla. Although details cannot be reliably established, the outcome was unequivocal: one Union ram was sunk (later to be recovered), while seven of the eight Rebel vessels were either sunk or in the possession of the Yankees. General Earl Van Dorn alone escaped. She fled to safety up the Yazoo River, only to be burned (somewhat unintentionally) on 26 June.

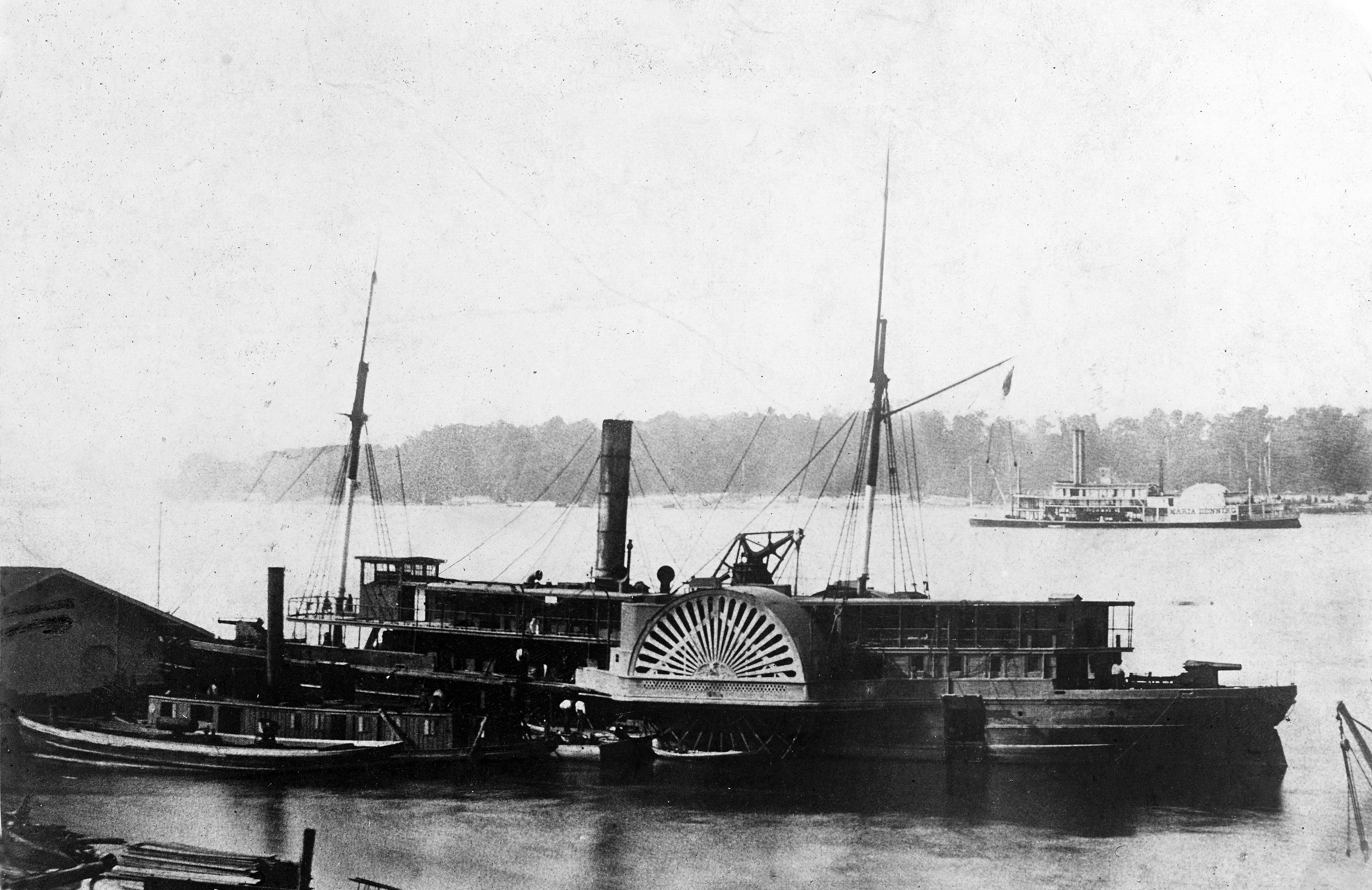
{Ex CSS} USS General Bragg probably photographed at Cairo or Mound City, Illinois, circa 1862–63.

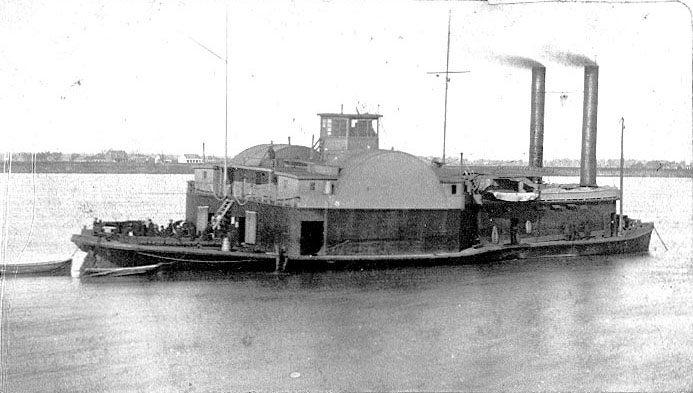
{Ex CSS} USS General Price off Baton Rouge, LA, January 18, 1864

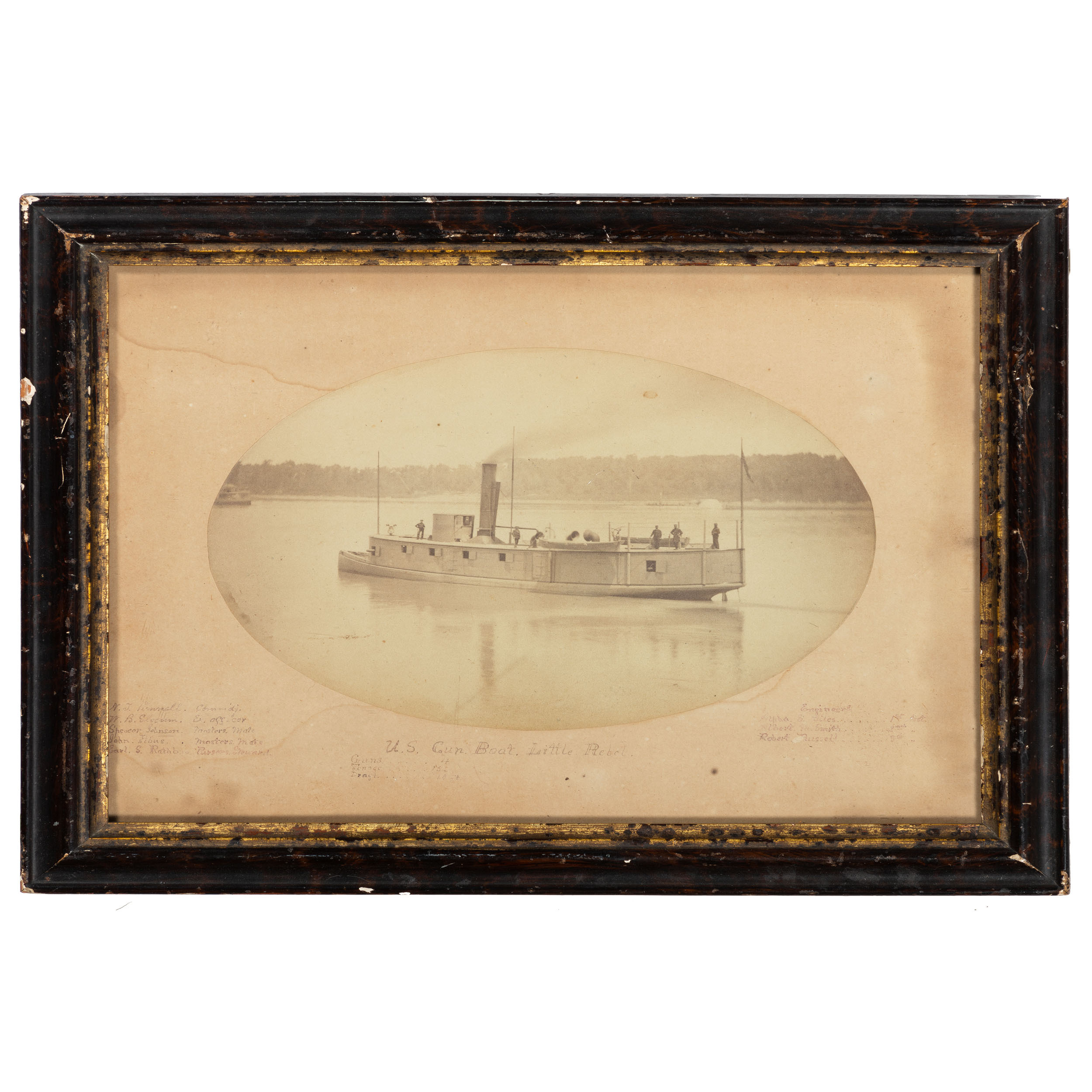
'USS (ex-CSS) Little Rebel

== Summary ==
The end of the River Defence Fleet rather early in the war permitted the people who had to work with it to evaluate its performance. None did so with more vehemence than General Lovell. Although his criticism was directed at the six vessels of the New Orleans section of the fleet, it can be applied with little alteration to the entire force: "Unable to govern themselves, and unwilling to be governed by others, their almost total want of system, vigilance, and discipline rendered them nearly useless and helpless."

In a larger context than merely a group of fourteen ships, the end of the River Defense Fleet, coupled with the demise of privateering, also marked the effective end of naval war conducted by amateurs. The increasing divergence between merchant ships and warships meant that the latter had to be commanded, and largely manned, by men who devoted their lives to the profession. Since the Civil War, no major maritime nation has considered resorting to private fleets, no matter what the circumstances.

== See also ==
- Bibliography of early American naval history
