= USS Little Rebel =

Gunboat of the United States Navy

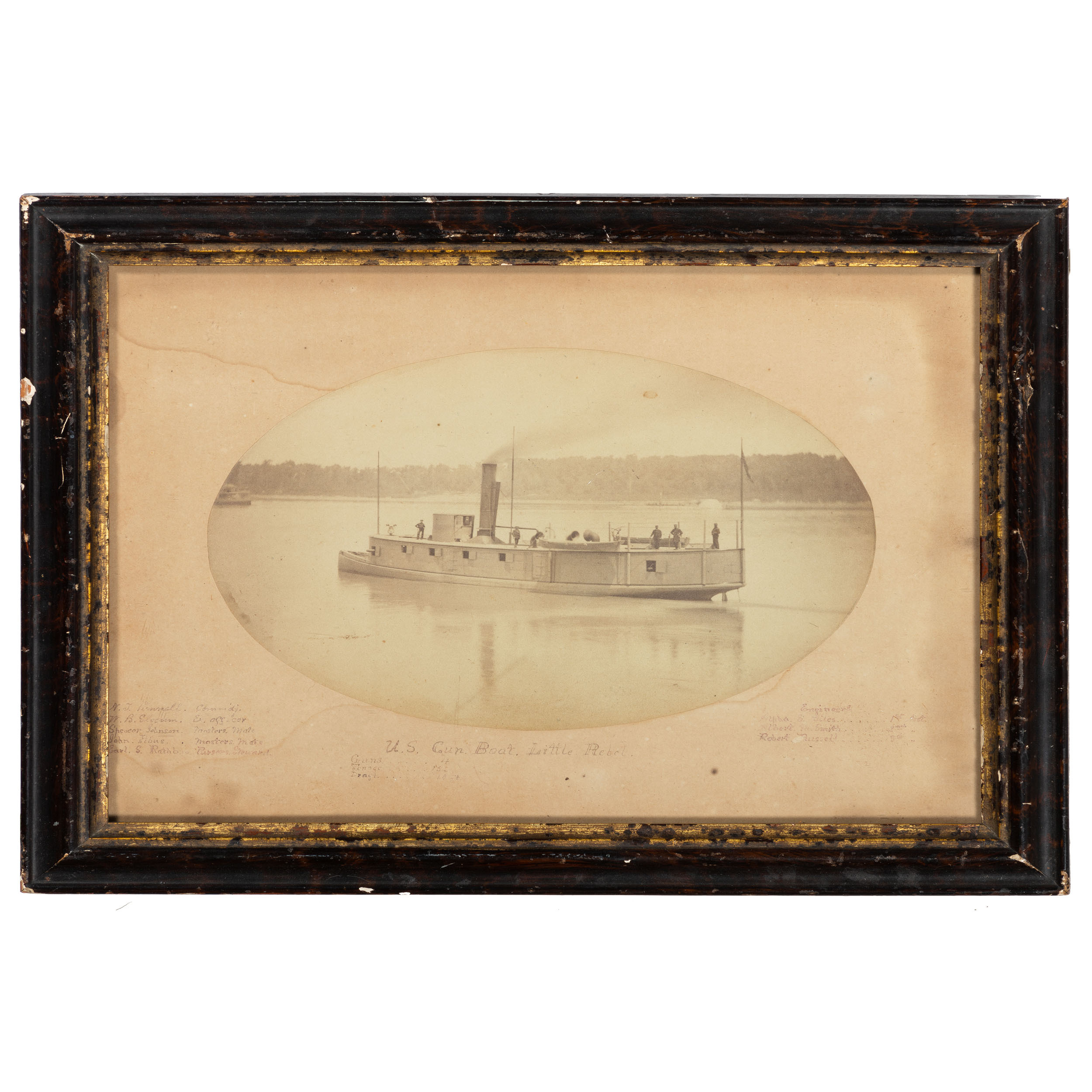
- USS (ex-CSS) Little Rebel

History

Confederate States
- Name: CSS Little Rebel
- Launched: 1859
- Acquired: January 1862
- Commissioned: 1862
- Fate: Captured, 6 June 1862

United States
- Name: USS Little Rebel
- Acquired: 6 June 1862
- Commissioned: 9 January 1863
- Decommissioned: 24 July 1865
- Fate: Sold into merchant service, 29 November 1865

General characteristics
- Type: Cotton-clad ram
- Displacement: 161 long tons (164 t)
- Draft: 12 ft (3.7 m)
- Propulsion: Steam engine, screw-propelled
- Speed: 12 knots (22 km/h; 14 mph)
- Armament: 3 × 12-pounder guns

Little Rebel was a cotton-clad ram that had been converted from a Mississippi River steamer to serve as the flagship of the Confederate River Defense Fleet in the American Civil War. Sent from New Orleans to defend against the Federal descent of the Mississippi, she was among the force that engaged vessels of the Union Army's Western Gunboat Flotilla at the Battle of Plum Point Bend on May 10, 1862. On June 6, she again was involved in an action with the Federal gunboats, this time at the First Battle of Memphis. In the battle, a shot from a Federal gun pierced her boiler, disabling her, and she was then pushed aground by the Federal ram USS Monarch and captured.

Subsequently, repaired and taken into the Union Navy, she served through the remainder of the war, seeing only limited action. After the war, she was deemed surplus by the Navy Department. Sold, she reentered the merchant service, where she remained until 1874.

== Confederate service ==
Little Rebel was built as R. E. and A. N. Watson at Belle Vernon, Pennsylvania, in 1859. She was acquired at New Orleans, Louisiana, by the Confederate Army in January 1862, and selected by Captain James E. Montgomery, a Mississippi River boatman, to be part of his River Defense Fleet. On January 25, 1862, Montgomery began her conversion to a cotton-clad ram by placing a 4-inch oak sheath with a 1-inch iron covering on her bow, and by installing double pine bulkheads filled with compressed cotton bales to protect her engines.

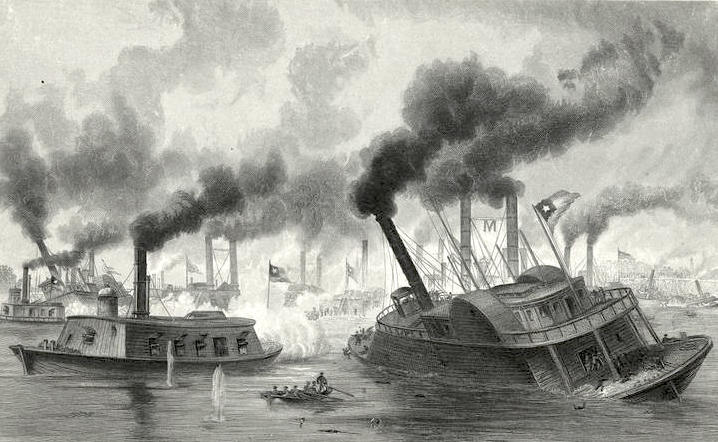
The First Battle of Memphis, CSS Little Rebel it is to the left of the rammed vessel.

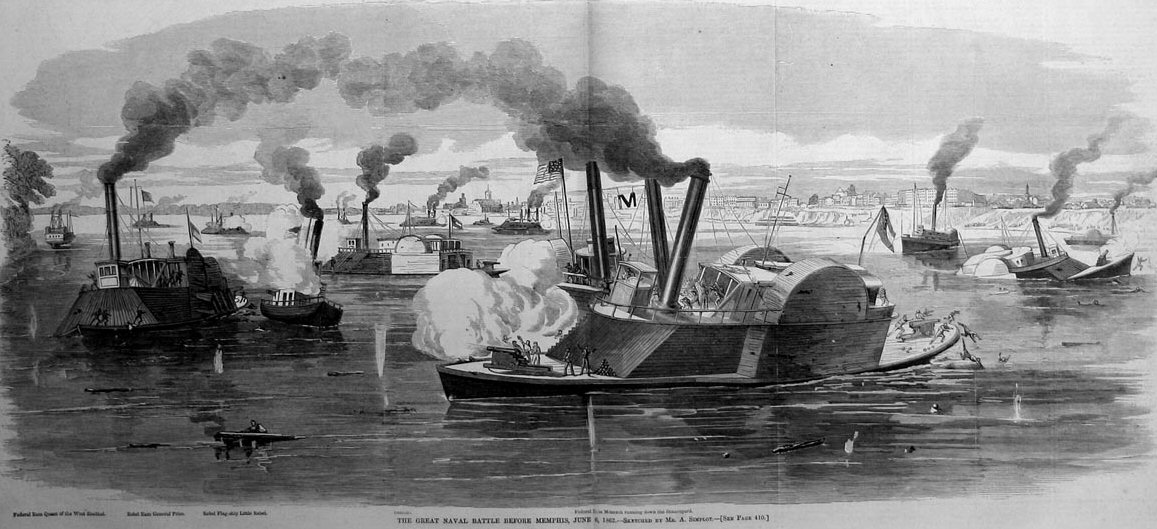
First Battle of Memphis; Little Rebel third from the left

On April 11, Little Rebel's conversion was completed and she steamed from New Orleans to Fort Pillow, Tennessee, where she operated in defense of the river approaches to Memphis. On May 10, 1862, off Fort Pillow, Little Rebel, in company with seven other vessels under Captain Montgomery, attacked the ironclad gunboats of the Federal Western Gunboat Flotilla. The action of Plum Point Bend was marked by successful ramming tactics by the Confederates, but Little Rebel, under Captain J. White Fowler, serving as Montgomery's flagship, was unable to get into the battle except with her guns. Brigadier General M. Jeff Thompson, CSA, who witnessed the battle said that Little Rebel, under a shower of enemy missiles, "ran amid the storm as heedlessly as if charmed." Meanwhile, her guns supported Montgomery's other vessels which were ramming Union boats.

Later Montgomery's force held off the Federal rams and gunboats until Fort Pillow was evacuated on 1 June. Then the Confederate vessels fell back on Memphis to take on coal. Following the Federal capture of Fort Pillow, Flag Officer Charles Henry Davis, USN, commanding the Western Flotilla, pressed on without delay and appeared off Memphis with a superior force on June 6, 1862. The flotilla was accompanied by the Ellet rams, a separate group of vessels commanded by Col. Charles Ellet, Jr. Montgomery, unable to retreat to Vicksburg because of his shortage of fuel and unwilling to destroy his boats, determined to fight. In the ensuing First Battle of Memphis, Little Rebel attacked the ram USS Monarch, one of the two rams to participate in the battle. The Confederate vessel was hit in her boilers by fire from USS Carondelet and then was struck by Monarch and driven ashore by the blow. Her surviving crew fled to safety, abandoning Little Rebel.

== Service in the Union Navy ==
The Union squadron captured the abandoned Little Rebel and sent her to Cairo, Illinois, June 11 for repairs and for adjudication before the Illinois Prize Court. Her seizure was judged to be legal, so she was purchased by the U.S. Navy from the prize court. On January 9, 1863, she entered Federal service. She was first assigned to a flotilla of gunboats commanded by Lieutenant Commander LeRoy Fitch, who had to suppress guerrilla activity on the Ohio, Cumberland, and Tennessee Rivers. Her deep draft made her unsuitable for this duty, so she spent much time on guard duty in the vicinity of Cairo.

Little Rebel patrolled from Red River to Fort Adams in March 1863, as Union ships captured Fort De Russey and moved to counter Maximilian's threat to Texas. Steaming to the Mississippi River in April, she patrolled this area for the remainder of the conflict.

In May 1865, she and the other Union ships of the Mississippi River Squadron guarded to prevent the escape of Jefferson Davis. On the 28th, she convoyed troops to Red River, remaining at the mouth of the river when the squadron was reduced in June. The Ships log was kept during union service by Acting Assistant Engineer Albert martin Clinton Smith (1834–67), a native of New Haven, Oswego County New York. Smith passed the log book on to his family, it is currently owned by a 3rd great Grandson, Shawn Doyle. A digital copy is at Half-Shire Historical Society in Richland, New York.

== Decommissioning, sale, and post-war civilian career ==
Little Rebel decommissioned at Mound City, Illinois, July 24, 1865 and was sold there to Daniel Jacobs on November 29, 1865. Redocumented as Spy on March 4, 1867, she remained in merchant service until 1874.
