= Nutmeg grater =

Device used to grate a nutmeg seed

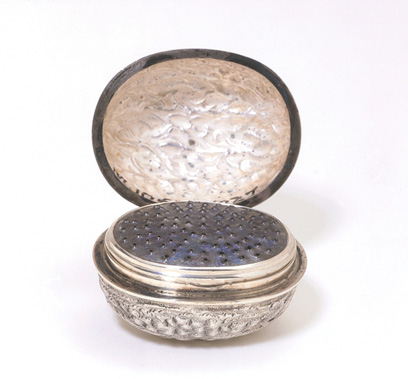
Silver nutmeg grater, England, 1800–1825. Victoria and Albert Museum no. M.1065-1927

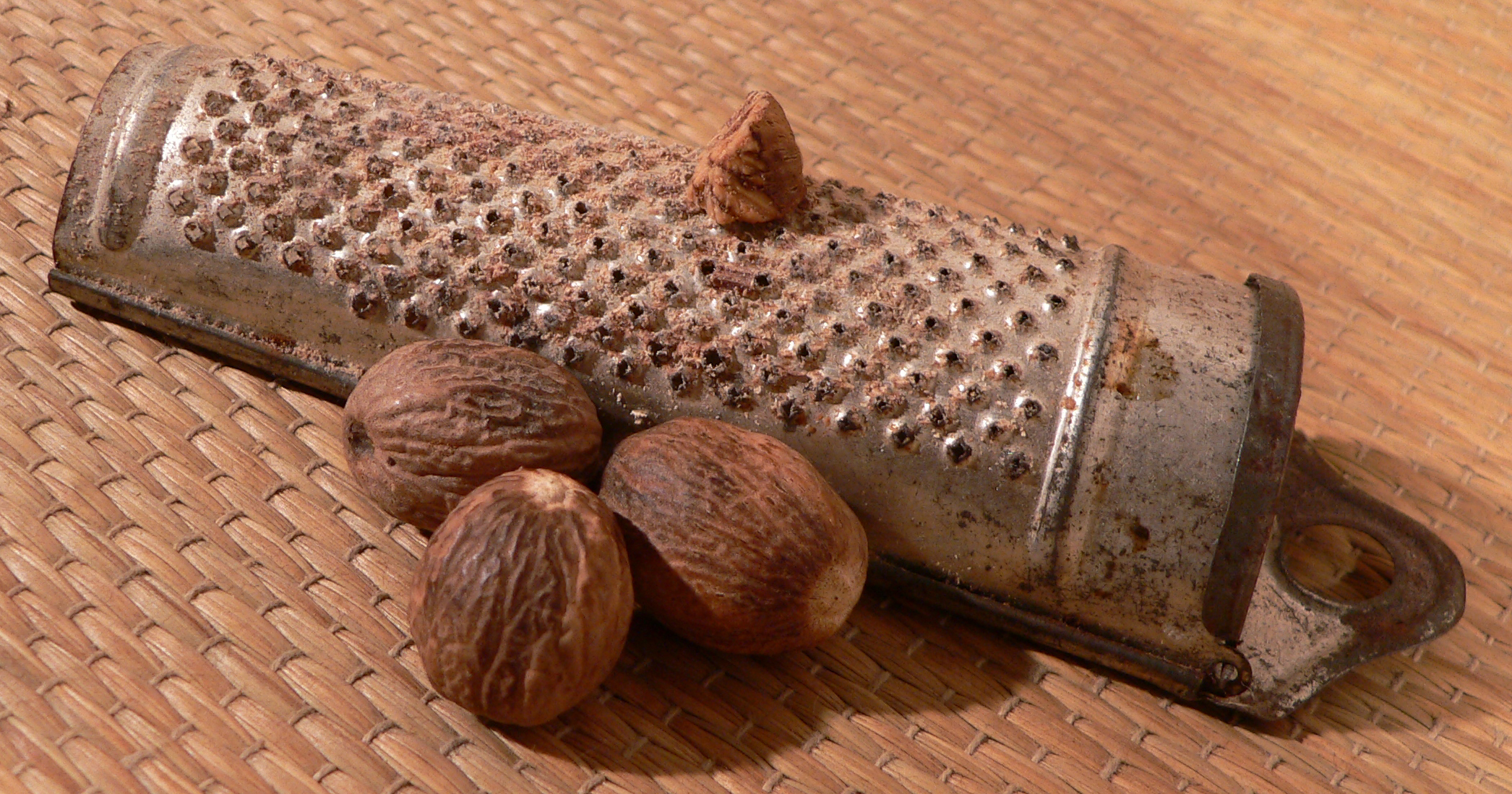
Nutmeg grater

A nutmeg grater, also called a nutmeg rasp, is a device used to grate a nutmeg seed. Nutmeg graters are normally metal, cylindrical or half-cylindrical, the surface perforated with small rasped holes. The nutmeg is passed over the surface to grate. The grater may be combined with a compartment for storing the nutmeg seed between uses.

In the late 17th century, nutmeg and nutmeg graters became associated with drinking punch, at that time a fashionable alcoholic beverage. Through the 18th century, it was the fashion for men to carry nutmeg in a pocket-sized silver container equipped with a grater in order to add freshly grated nutmeg to punch.

Nutmeg graters are a bartenders' tool, used for adding freshly grated nutmeg to hot toddies, eggnogs, and other drinks.
