= USS Cincinnati =

Five ships of the United States Navy have been named USS Cincinnati, after the city of Cincinnati, Ohio.

- USS Cincinnati (1861) was an ironclad river gunboat commissioned in 1862, sunk twice in battle and raised each time, and sold in 1866.
- USS Cincinnati (C-7) was a protected cruiser in service from 1894 to 1919.
- USS Cincinnati (CL-6) was a light cruiser commissioned in 1924, on patrols in the Atlantic Ocean during World War II, and scrapped in 1946.
- USS Cincinnati (SSN-693) was a Los Angeles-class nuclear attack submarine in service from 1978 to 1996.
- USS Cincinnati (LCS-20) is an Independence-class littoral combat ship.
