= CSS General M. Jeff Thompson =

Cottonclad ram of the Confederate States Navy

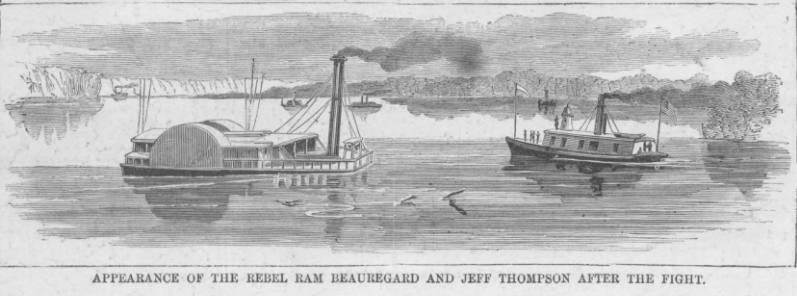
- CSS General Beauregard and CSS General M. Jeff Thompson after the First Battle of Memphis; M. Jeff Thompson is obscured by the smoke cloud at the right.

History

Confederate States
- Name: General M. Jeff Thompson
- Namesake: M. Jeff Thompson
- Acquired: January 1862
- In service: April 11, 1862
- Fate: Ran aground and blew up, June 6, 1862

General characteristics
- Type: Sidewheel steamer
- Propulsion: Steam engine, side wheels

CSS General M. Jeff Thompson was a warship which served in the River Defense Fleet of the Confederate States of America during the American Civil War. Purchased in January 1862, the vessel was operated by the Confederate States Army and named after M. Jeff Thompson, an officer in the Missouri State Guard. She was equipped with a ram and armored as a cottonclad. General M. Jeff Thompson participated in the Battle of Plum Point Bend in May 1862, before being sunk on June 6 in the First Battle of Memphis. Her wreck remained on the floor of the Mississippi River until it was removed by a snagboat in July 1867; it had caused a shipwreck about six months earlier when another vessel struck it.

== Service history ==
In 1862, the Confederate States of America purchased 14 civilian vessels for conversion into warships to serve in the River Defense Fleet. The naval vessels were operated by the Confederate States Army. One of those purchased in January 1862 by Captain J. E. Montgomery became the CSS General M. Jeff Thompson. The ship was named for M. Jeff Thompson, a senior officer in the Missouri State Guard. The ship's civilian name is unknown, and in Confederate service was also known as Jeff Thompson. A sidewheel steamer, she was commanded by Captain John H. Burke. The vessel's dimensions are not known.

The Confederacy decided to convert the ship into a ram. The process of converting the civilian vessel into a ram began on January 25, and took place at New Orleans, Louisiana. Her bow was thickened with 4 inches (10 cm) of oak wood, and 1 inch (2.5 cm) of iron. She was also converted to a cottonclad by adding bulkheads that were filled with cotton. General M. Jeff Thompson was completed on April 11, and then sent from New Orleans up the Mississippi River. Thompson himself described General M. Jeff Thompson as "the largest and best, but slowest boat of the fleet".

General M. Jeff Thompson was sent to Fort Pillow, where she participated in the naval defense of Memphis, Tennessee, which was roughly 50 miles (80 km) to the south. The Confederate ships were facing the Union Navy's Mississippi Flotilla. Union vessels approached Fort Pillow and began shelling it. In response, Montgomery decided to attack on May 10, using his ram ships and the element of surprise to capture some of the Union ships. The morning of the planned attack, the Confederates attacked, bringing on the Battle of Plum Point Bend. General M. Jeff Thompson was involved in the battle, but only to the extent of firing her cannons. The battle was a tactical victory for the Confederates, but brought no long-term strategic advantage. The Confederates abandoned Fort Pillow on June 4, falling back to Memphis. The Confederate vessels served as a rear guard until the fort was evacuated.

Montgomery and the River Defense Fleet reached Memphis on June 5, with fuel supplies low. By this time, the Confederates had decided to abandon Memphis, with the only other Confederate forces in the city being a land rear guard commanded by Thompson. The night of June 5/6, Montgomery held a council of war with his ships' captains. Presented with options of scuttling their ships, scuttling a portion of the fleet and escaping on the remainder, or fighting the Union fleet, the council voted to fight. Unbeknown to the Confederates, the Union ships had been reinforced by a group of ram ships. During the ensuing First Battle of Memphis on June 6, all but one of the Confederate ships present were lost. General M. Jeff Thompson was struck by Union cannon fire during the battle and began to burn. Her crew intentionally grounded the vessel and then abandoned it; the vessel blew up when the fire reached her magazine. Wreckage was strewn over the area, and the ship burned to the waterline. The cotton from her wreck was later salvaged. Her wreck remained on the river bottom near President's Island, and caused another wreck in January 1867 when a steamboat named Platte Valley hit General M. Jeff Thompson's remains with loss of life. Deemed a hazard to river traffic, the wreck was removed by a snagboat in July 1867.

== Sources ==
- Calore, Paul (2002). Naval Campaigns of the Civil War. Jefferson, North Carolina: McFarland & Company. ISBN 978-0-7864-1217-4.
- Chatelain, Neil P. (2020). Defending the Arteries of Rebellion: Confederate Naval Operations in the Mississippi River Valley, 1861–1865. El Dorado Hills, California: Savas Beatie. ISBN 978-1-61121-510-6.
- Gaines, W. Craig (2008). Encyclopedia of Civil War Shipwrecks. Baton Rouge, Louisiana: Louisiana State University Press. ISBN 978-0-8071-3274-6.
- McCaul, Edward B. Jr (2014). To Retain Command of the Mississippi: The Civil War Naval Campaign for Memphis. Knoxville, Tennessee: University of Tennessee Press. ISBN 978-1-62190-135-8.
- Silverstone, Paul H. (1989). Warships of the Civil War Navies. Annapolis, Maryland: Naval Institute Press. ISBN 0-87021-783-6.
