= Laurent Millaudon (steamboat) =

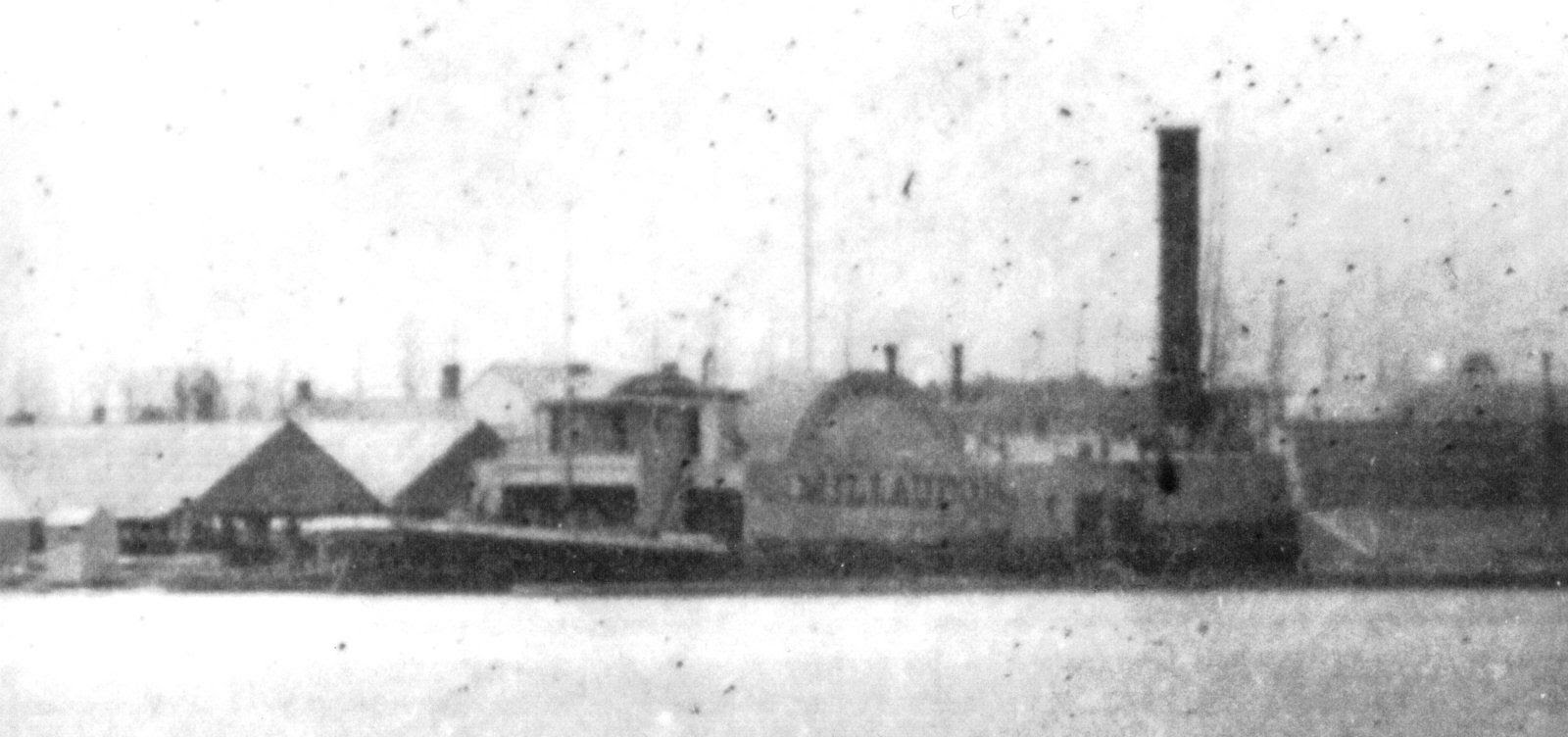
- Laurent Millaudon

History

private
- Name: Laurent Millaudon
- Launched: 1856

Confederate States
- Name: CSS General Sterling Price
- Commissioned: 1861
- Fate: Sunk 6 June 1862 at the First Battle of Memphis
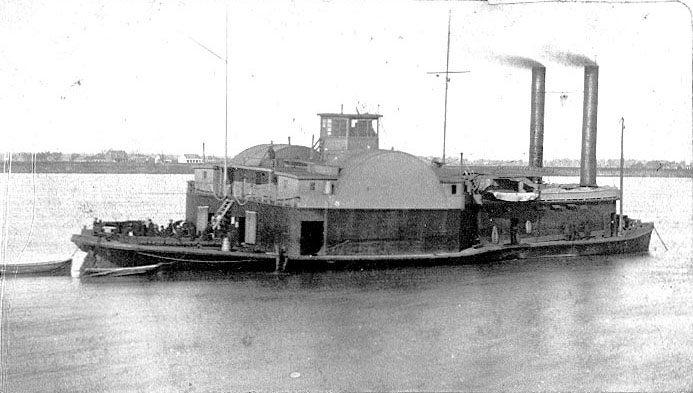
- USS General Price off Baton Rouge, Louisiana, 18 January 1864

United States
- Name: USS General Price
- Commissioned: 30 September 1862
- Decommissioned: 24 July 1865
- Fate: Sold 3 October 1866 to W. H. Harrison

General characteristics
- Displacement: 633 tons
- Length: 182 ft (55 m)
- Beam: 30 ft (9.1 m)
- Draft: 9.2 ft (2.8 m)
- Propulsion: steam engine
- Armor: 4-inch oak sheath with a 1-inch iron covering on her bow; double pine bulkheads filled with compressed cotton bales

Laurent Millaudon was a wooden side-wheel river steamboat launched at Cincinnati, Ohio, in 1856 operating in the New Orleans, Louisiana, area, and captained by W. S. Whann. At the beginning of the American Civil War she was taken into service by the Confederate Navy as CSS General Sterling Price. On 6 June 1862, she was sunk at the First Battle of Memphis. She was raised and repaired by the Union army, and on 16 June 1862 was moved into Union service as USS General Price and served until the end of the war.

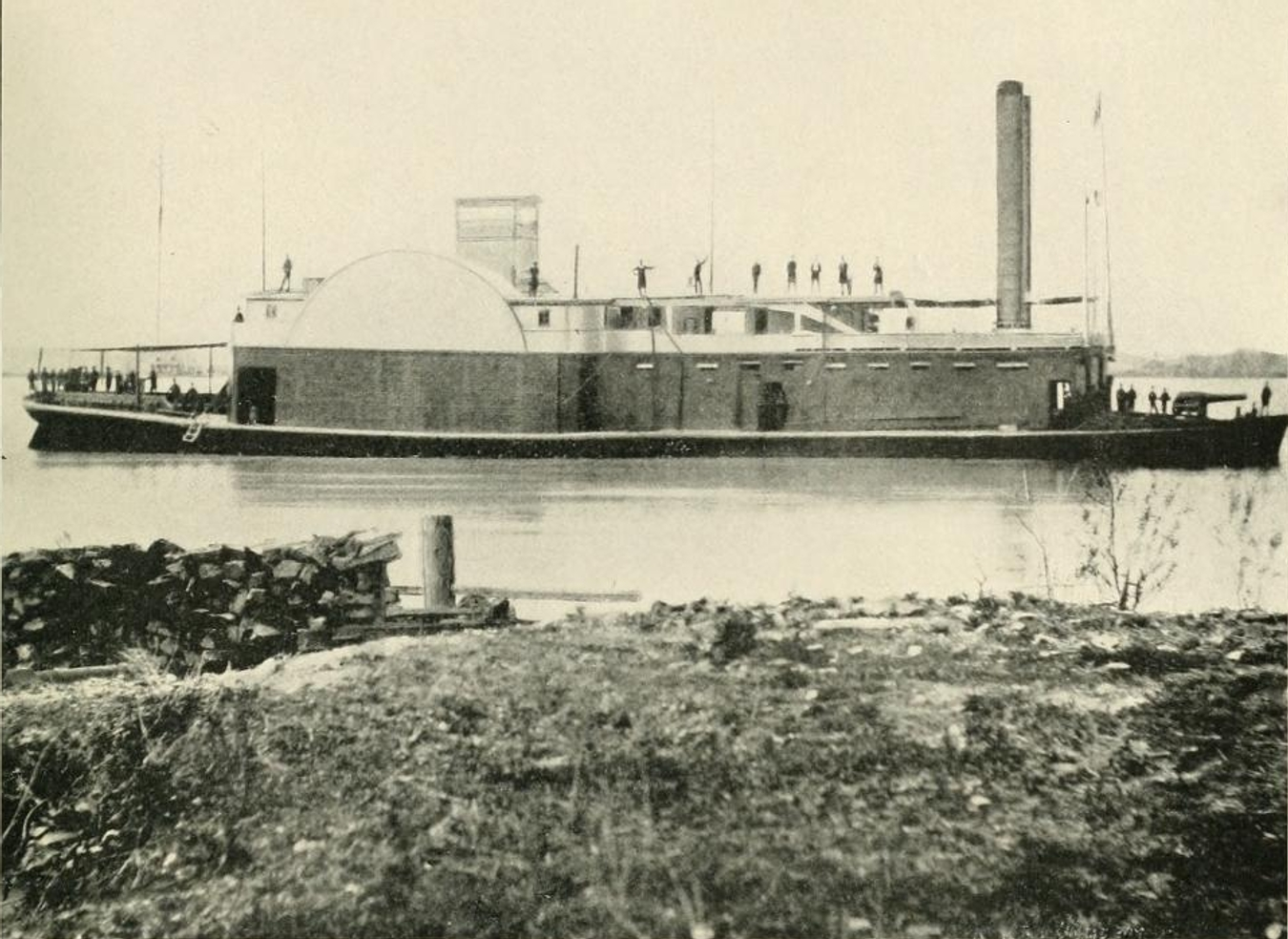
CSS General Sterling Price.

== CSS General Sterling Price ==
CSS General Sterling Price, often referred to as General Price or Price, was built as Laurent Millaudon, (or L. Millandon or Milledon) at Cincinnati, Ohio, in 1856. She was acquired for Confederate service and fitted out at New Orleans, Louisiana, for the River Defense Fleet (See DANFS appendix II) and was renamed after the Confederate general Sterling Price. On 25 January 1862, Captain Montgomery began to convert her into a cottonclad ram by placing a 4-inch oak sheath with a 1-inch iron covering on her bow, and by installing double pine bulkheads filled with compressed cotton bales. (This evidently increased her displacement from the 483 tons specified for the Laurent Millaudon to the 633 tons specified for the General Price.) On 25 March, General Price commanded by Captain J. H. Townsend, sailed from New Orleans to Memphis, Tennessee, where she stayed until 10 April having her ironwork completed. She was then sent to Fort Pillow, Tennessee, where she operated in defense of the river approaches to Memphis.

On 10 May 1862, off Fort Pillow, General Price under First Officer J. E. Henthorne (or Harthorne), in company with seven other vessels under Captain Montgomery attacked the ironclad gunboats of the Union Mississippi River Squadron. In the action of Plum Point Bend, which followed, the Confederate ram CSS General Bragg struck Cincinnati halting her retreat. This allowed General Price to violently ram the Federal gunboat, taking away her rudder, stern post, and a large piece of her stern, decisively disabling her. At the same time General Price's well directed fire silenced Federal Mortar boat No. 16, which was being guarded by Cincinnati. General Price was heavily hit in this action. Her upper works were severely damaged, and she was struck by a 128-pound shell which cut off her supply pipes and caused a dangerous leak.

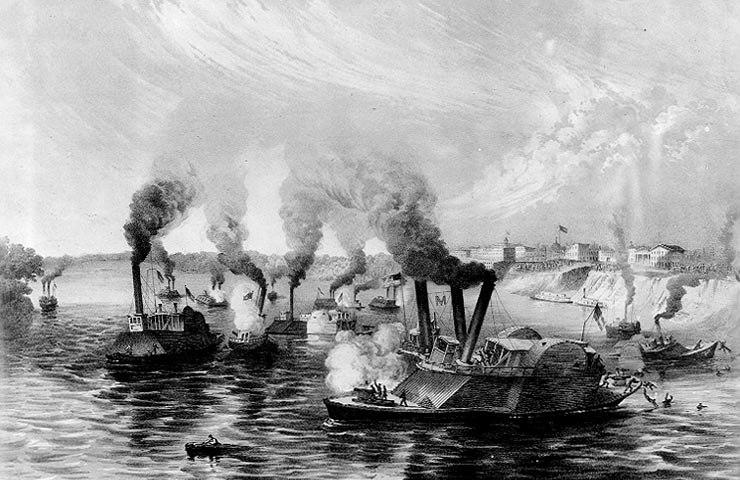
Destruction of the Confederate force at the First Battle of Memphis. CSS General Sterling Price is the ship directly behind the bow of the closest ship.

The Confederates quickly repaired General Price and later she participated with Montgomery's force in holding off Federal vessels until Fort Pillow was successfully evacuated on 1 June. The Confederate vessels then fell back on Memphis to take coal.

Following the Federal capture of Fort Pillow, Flag Officer Charles H. Davis USN, commanding the Mississippi River Squadron, pressed on without delay and appeared off Memphis with a superior force on 6 June. Montgomery, unable to retreat to Vicksburg, Mississippi because of his shortage of fuel, and unwilling to destroy his boats, determined to fight against heavy odds. In the ensuing First Battle of Memphis, General Price charged the Federal ram USS Monarch but instead collided with the Confederate ram CSS General Beauregard, also attacking Monarch. General Price lost her wheel and was disabled. While the two Confederate vessels were entangled, Federal rams attacked them mercilessly. General Price collided with the Federal ram USS Queen of the West under Col. Charles Ellet, Jr., commander of the United States Ram Fleet. As Queen of the West captured her crew, General Price sank slowly onto a sand bar. She was later raised by the Union army and taken into Federal service.

== USS General Price ==
USS General Price was a cottonclad river ram and gunboat in the United States Navy during the American Civil War. She was formerly a Confederate ram named CSS General Sterling Price that was sunk and captured during the First Battle of Memphis on 6 June 1862 by Union naval forces under Flag Officer Charles H. Davis. After the Union victory, she was raised by the Union army and taken to Cairo, Illinois, for repairs. She was moved into the Union service under Lt. LeRoy Fitch on 16 June 1862 and was moved to Cairo for repairs. The ram was formally transferred to the Navy by Quartermaster H. A. Wise at Cairo on 30 September 1862. Although at that time she was renamed USS General Price, she continued to be referred to as General Sterling Price in Union dispatches.

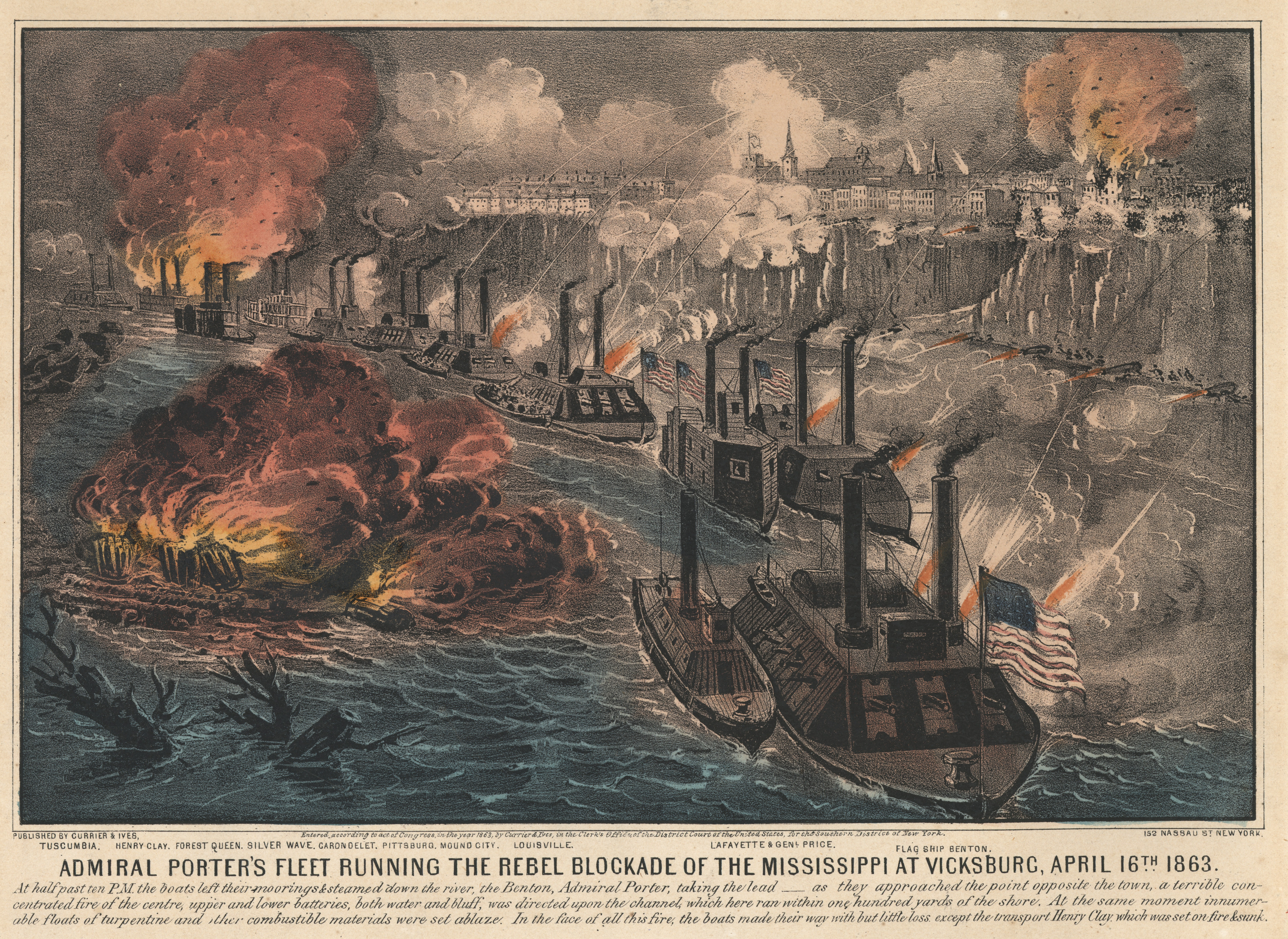
Lithograph of the Mississippi River Squadron running the Confederate blockade at Vicksburg on 16 April 1863. The lead ship is the flagship USS Benton with a coal tender, followed by USS Lafayette with General Price lashed to her starboard (right) side.

Completing repairs and conversion at Cairo on 11 March 1863, General Price departed for duty with the Mississippi River Squadron, arriving at Black Bayou a few days later, to join in the Union's Vicksburg campaign. The commander of the squadron, Rear Admiral David Dixon Porter was at that time attempting to move up the shallow and overgrown Steele's Bayou on the Mississippi River in a move to cut off Vicksburg, Mississippi, from the rear, and General Price joined the expedition. After several days of slow and difficult progress, harassed by Confederate troops, the gunboats were forced to withdraw on 22 March 1863. General Ulysses S. Grant and Admiral Porter then conceived a plan to attack Vicksburg from the south. This would require the Mississippi squadron to slip past the Confederate blockade of the river at Vicksburg in order to defend and transport Grant's army across the Mississippi south of the city. As a member of Admiral Porter's flotilla, General Price ran the Confederate blockade at Vicksburg on 16 April 1863. Lashed to the starboard side of the ironclad USS Lafayette during the run, she suffered little damage, and arrived safely at New Carthage, Louisiana, early the next day with the rest of the fleet. Porter was then in a position to assault Grand Gulf, Mississippi, and, during the heavy engagement with the batteries there on 29 April and 3 May 1863, General Price, under the command of Commander Selim E. Woodworth, carried troops across the river and conveyed transports under fire. The Confederacy was forced to evacuate this vital point on the river, and the fate of Vicksburg was sealed.

General Price departed Grand Gulf for the Red River on 3 May and took part in the capture of Alexandria, Louisiana, and assisted in the partial destruction of Fort DeRussy, Louisiana, between 3 May and 17 May. During this period, General Price acted briefly as Admiral Porter's flagship, and on 10 May she was sent on a reconnaissance up the Black River, where she engaged strong Confederate batteries at Harrisonburg, Louisiana. On 22 June 1863 the Sterling price received 8 replacements to augment the 12 aboard that were fit for duty, the remainder of the crew being ill.

As Union pressure against Vicksburg mounted, General Price played a major part in the continuing bombardment of the city and in gunfire support of the Union troops until the Confederacy's river stronghold finally surrendered on 4 July. She was at Bayou Sara, Louisiana, below Vicksburg on 7 July 1863 and was in Memphis on 16 July and left there for Cairo and much-needed repairs, which were not completed until about 19 November.

General Price rejoined the squadron at Memphis on 2 December 1863 and soon became part of Rear Admiral Porter's planned expedition up the Red River. Before joining Porter, she accidentally rammed USS Conestoga on 8 March 1864 after a confusion in whistle signals, causing the latter ship to sink quickly as a total loss. Accompanying the Red River expedition as far as Alexandria, Louisiana, General Price returned to the mouth of the river on 6 April convoying transports.

She then took up regular cruising station on the lower Mississippi River, protecting transports, landing reconnaissance parties, and keeping the river free from Confederate guerrillas. While on this duty, she engaged a Confederate battery off Tunic Bend, Louisiana, on 19 May forced it to withdraw, and landed a shore party which burned the Confederate headquarters. General Price continued her patrol duties between New Orleans, Louisiana and Donaldsonville, Louisiana, until the end of the war. She decommissioned at Mound City, Illinois, on 24 July 1865 and was sold on 3 October 1866 to W. H. Harrison.

== See also ==
- Bibliography of early American naval history
- Benjamin Laurent Millaudon
