= USS Monarch =

Sidewheel, American Civil War

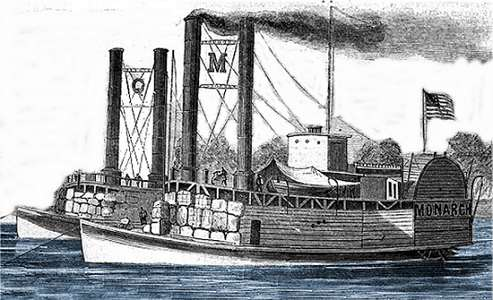
- USS Monarch and her sister ship USS Queen Of The West

History

United States
- Name: Monarch
- Namesake: Previous name retained
- Launched: 1853
- Acquired: April 1862
- Commissioned: 1862
- Decommissioned: After July 1863
- Fate: Scrapped July 1865

General characteristics
- Displacement: 406 tons
- Length: 180 ft (55 m)
- Beam: 37 ft 6 in (11.43 m)
- Propulsion: Side-wheel steamer
- Complement: 120 officers and men
- Armament: 1 30-pounder cannon, 3 12-pounder howitzers

USS Monarch was a United States Army sidewheel ram that saw service in the American Civil War as part of the United States Ram Fleet and the Mississippi Marine Brigade. She operated on the Mississippi River and Yazoo River during 1862 and 1863.

== Construction and acquisition ==
Monarch was built as a sidewheel towboat at Fulton, Ohio, in 1853. She sank in the Ohio River at Louisville, Kentucky, on 5 March 1861, but was refloated and repaired. The United States Army purchased her at Pittsburgh, Pennsylvania, in April 1862 for service in support of Union Army operations and converted her into a ram in 1862 for service in conjunction with the Western Flotilla on the Mississippi River as part of the Army's United States Ram Fleet under Lieutenant Colonel Charles Ellet, Jr. She was commissioned at Pittsburgh with Captain R. W. Sanford in command.

== Service history ==
=== First Battle of Memphis ===
After fitting out at New Albany, Indiana, Monarch began active duty with the Ram Fleet. Steaming downriver in May 1862, she scouted Fort Pillow, Tennessee, in June 1862 and joined her sister ship, the sidewheel paddle steamer USS Queen of the West, and the ironclad gunboats USS Benton, USS Cairo, USS Carondelet, USS Louisville, and USS St. Louis in the Battle of Memphis on 6 June 1862. Engaging the Confederate River Defense Fleet, the rams destroyed seven of the Confederate ships, wiping out the Defense Fleet as an effective naval force. During the battle, Monarch rammed the cottonclad rams CSS Colonel Lovell and General Beauregard. The Union forces took Memphis, Tennessee, on 6 June 1862, clearing the upper Mississippi River of Confederate forts and naval craft.

On 26 June 1862, Monarch and the ram USS Lancaster pursued General Earl Van Dorn down the Mississippi and up the Yazoo River, the Confederates burning General Earl Van Dorn below Yazoo City, Mississippi, to prevent her capture.

=== Battle of Vicksburg ===
Beginning in June 1862, Monarch operated against Vicksburg, Mississippi. Monarch and five other ships departed Helena, Arkansas, on 16 August 1862 on a U.S. Army-U.S. Navy expedition in Mississippi up the Yazoo River with troops landing at various points along the shore and destroying Confederate artillery batteries on the river. Union ships captured the sidewheel paddle steamer CSS Fairplay above Vicksburg on 27 August 1862; Monarch then cruised the Yazoo with the sidewheel paddle steamer USS General Bragg to prevent Confederate use of the steamer Paul Jones and to hinder communications with Vicksburg. Later that year, Monarch swept naval mines in the Yazoo.

=== Battle of Arkansas Post ===
Monarch joined 11 other ships in the expedition to capture Fort Hindman, Arkansas, 4 January 1863, a point that Rear Admiral David Dixon Porter noted as "a tough nut to crack." Joining efforts with Major General William Tecumseh Sherman's troops on 9 January 1863, the Union ships fought in the Battle of Arkansas Post and shared in the capture of Fort Hindman on 11 January.

=== Later service ===
In February 1863, Monarch steamed up the Yazoo to Greenville, Mississippi, to relieve Commander Prichett, controlling guerilla activity. In April 1863, she joined the rams USS Fulton, USS Lioness, and USS T. D. Horner in supporting Colonel Ellet's marine brigade in the Tennessee Valley.

With the fall of Vicksburg in July 1863 and the collapse of Confederate naval forces on the western rivers, Monarch′s mission was accomplished. She was laid up on the Mississippi River below St. Louis, Missouri, after July 1863 and was dropped from the naval list in 1864, but remained in reserve, ready for recall to active service. On April 30. 1864 the "Monarch" was at Memphis, as she was used to transport Lt. Col. Isaac Rutishauser, 58th Illinois to deliver dispatches to Gen Nathaniel Banks effectively removing him from command of the ill fated Red River Campaign. By May 6th it had ascended the Red River to a point below Snaggy Point where its draft was too deep in the low water of the Red. Rutishauser transferred to the transport "City Belle", which then came under fire from two confederate batteries at Snaggy Pont. Disabled and driven ashore, Rutishauser along with most of the troops on the City Belle was captured, and presumptively, the Monarch returned to Memphis. She was sunk by ice in December 1864, but was refloated and taken to Mound City, Illinois, for dismantling in July 1865.

== See also ==
- Union Army
- Union Navy
- Anaconda Plan
