= Edward Y. McCauley =

American Navy admiral (1827–1894)

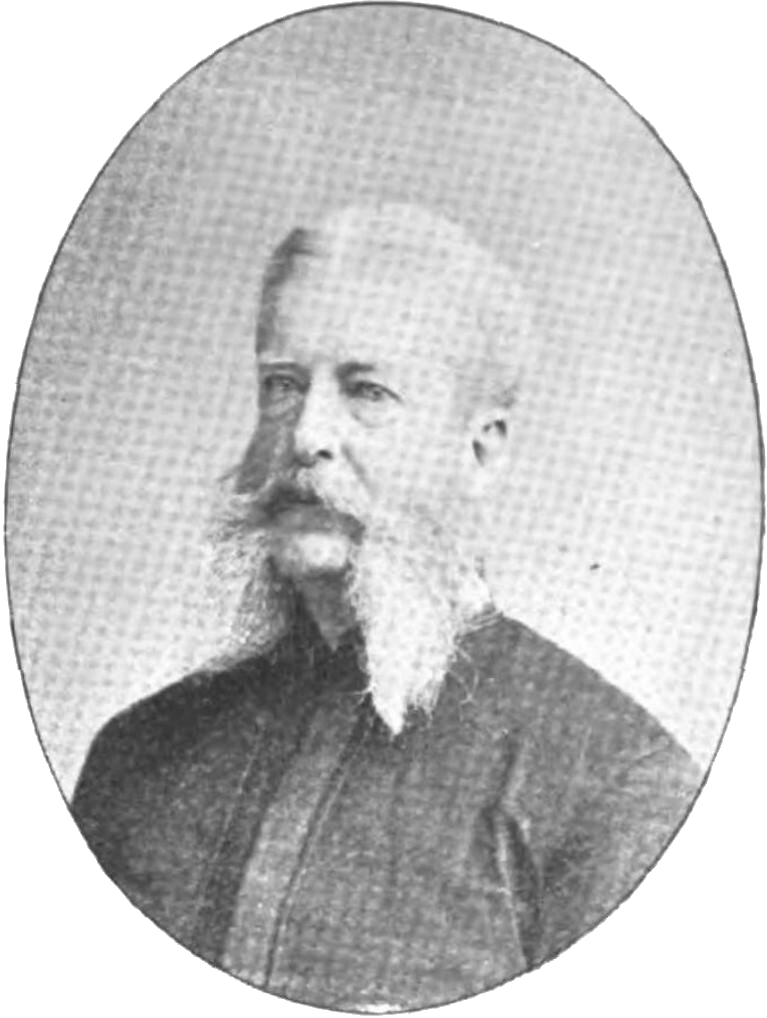
- Born: 2 November 1827; Philadelphia, Pennsylvania
- Died: 14 September 1894 (aged 66) Jamestown, Rhode Island
- Allegiance: United States of America
- Branch: United States Navy; Union Navy
- Service years: 1841–1859; 1861–1887
- Rank: Rear Admiral
- Commands: Pacific Squadron; League Island Navy Yard; Philadelphia Naval Asylum; USS Lackawanna; USS Benton; USS Tioga; USS Fort Henry
- Conflicts: American Civil War
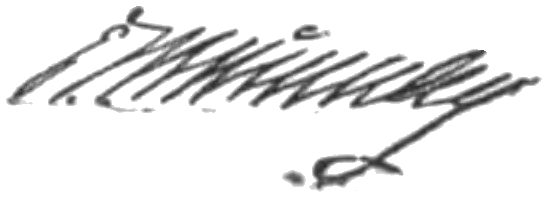
- Signature

Edward Yorke McCauley (2 November 1827 – 14 September 1894) was a United States Navy rear admiral. He served as commander of the Pacific Squadron from May 1885 to November 1886. During the American Civil War, he commanded three Union Navy vessels.

== Early life and education ==
McCauley was born in Philadelphia and raised in Tripoli, where his father Daniel Smith McCauley served as U.S. consul general to the Barbary States from 1831 to 1835 and then to the Ottoman Empire from 1835 to 1848. Living on the Mediterranean Sea, he became fluent in four languages. McCauley was appointed to the U.S. Navy as a midshipman on 9 September 1841 while still only thirteen years old. He received his training at sea attached to the Mediterranean Squadron aboard the USS Fairfield, the USS Delaware and the USS Cumberland. In May 1846, McCauley was reassigned to the Africa Squadron aboard the USS United States. He graduated from the United States Naval Academy in June 1847 and became a passed midshipman on 10 August 1847.

== Military career ==
After graduation, McCauley continued to serve with the Africa Squadron aboard the United States until January 1848 and then back with the Mediterranean Squadron aboard the USS Constitution from October 1848 until 1851 and the USS Independence from October 1851 to June 1852, when he was released to attend his father's funeral in Alexandria, where the elder McCauley had been serving as the first U.S. consul general to Egypt.

In August 1852, McCauley joined the East India Squadron aboard the USS Powhatan. His ship was part of the Perry Expedition, visiting Japan in 1854. Promoted to master on 1 July 1855, he took part in an engagement with Chinese pirates near Kowloon in August. Promoted to lieutenant on 14 September 1855, McCauley was assigned to the receiving ship USS Princeton in Philadelphia from 1856 to 1857 and then to the USS Niagara from March 1857 to August 1858, helping to lay the first trans-Atlantic telegraph cable.

From 1858 to 1859, McCauley was assigned to the Naval Observatory in Washington, D.C. Recently married and expecting his first child, he decided to resign from the Navy effective 19 August 1859 and become a businessman in Saint Paul, Minnesota.

After the outbreak of the Civil War, McCauley rejoined the navy on 11 May 1861 and was assigned as an acting lieutenant on the USS Flag as part of the South Atlantic Blockading Squadron. Promoted to lieutenant commander on 16 July 1862, he was reassigned to the East Gulf Blockading Squadron. McCauley commanded the USS Fort Henry from 1862 to 1863 and the USS Tioga from 1863 to 1864.

In Autumn 1864, McCauley joined the Mississippi Squadron, serving aboard the flagship USS Black Hawk. In November 1864, he assumed command of the large ironclad gunboat USS Benton with additional responsibility for all operations in the 5th Naval District between Grand Gulf and Natchez. In June 1865, McCauley participated in the capture of the CSS Missouri, the last operational Confederate ironclad on the Mississippi River.

After August 1865, McCauley served at the Philadelphia Navy Yard. In 1866, he was promoted to commander. From 1867 to 1868, he served as fleet captain aboard the flagship USS Susquehanna in the North Atlantic Squadron. From 1868 to 1870, McCauley was assigned to the Portsmouth Navy Yard. From 1871 to 1872, he was professor and head of the French Department at the Naval Academy.

Promoted to captain on 3 September 1872, McCauley commanded the sloop-of-war USS Lackawanna in the Asiatic Squadron from 1872 to 1875. From November 1875 to July 1878, he was captain of the yard at the Boston Navy Yard. McCauley then served as superintendent of the Philadelphia Naval Asylum until June 1880.

McCauley was assigned to the Bureau of Navigation in Washington, D.C. until October 1883. He was promoted to commodore on 7 August 1881. McCauley served as commandant of the League Island Navy Yard in Philadelphia from 1884 to 1885. Promoted to rear admiral on 2 March 1885, he was commander of the Pacific Squadron from 1885 to 1886. McCauley retired from active duty on 25 January 1887.

== Later life ==
Raised in the Mediterranean region, McCauley developed a lifelong interest in Egyptology which he continued to pursue after his retirement. While still on active duty, he published A Manual for the Use of Students in Egyptology in 1881 and A Dictionary of the Egyptian Language in 1883.

McCauley was elected to the American Philosophical Society in 1881. He was also a member of the Loyal Legion and the Oriental Society of Philadelphia. For his contributions to Egyptology, he was conferred an honorary LL.D. degree by Hobart College in 1892.

== Personal ==
McCauley was the son of Daniel Smith McCauley and Sarah (Yorke) McCauley. His father was a diplomat and former U.S. Navy lieutenant and his uncle Charles Stewart McCauley was a career naval officer who retired as a commodore.

On 28 January 1858, McCauley married Josephine McIlvaine Berkeley, the daughter of Virginia physician Carter Nelson Berkeley. They had two sons and two daughters. Their eldest son Carter Nelson Berkeley Macauley (28 July 1859 – 6 February 1896) was an 1882 Jefferson Medical College graduate and United States Army surgeon.

McCauley died at his home in Jamestown, Conanicut Island, Rhode Island. He was buried as Edward Yorke Macauley at Laurel Hill Cemetery in Philadelphia.
