= USS Benton =

Gunboat of the United States Navy

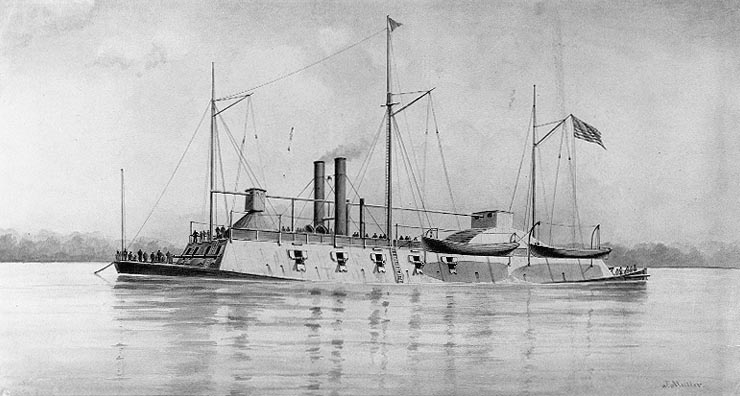
- USS Benton

History

United States
- Namesake: American senator Thomas Hart Benton
- Builder: James B. Eads, St. Louis, Missouri
- Acquired: early November 1861 for US$2,600
- Commissioned: February 24, 1862
- Decommissioned: July 20, 1865
- Fate: Sold November 29, 1865

General characteristics
- Displacement: 633 long tons (643 t)
- Length: 202 ft (62 m)
- Beam: 72 ft (22 m)
- Draft: 9 ft (2.7 m)
- Propulsion: Steam-driven stern paddlewheel; two inclined engines
- Speed: 5.5 knots
- Complement: 176 officers and enlisted
- Armament: (see section below)
- Armor: 2.5-inch (64 mm) forward casemate backed by 2.5-foot (76 cm) of wood; .625-inch (15.9 mm) lateral casemate backed by 2-foot (61 cm) of wood; 2.5-inch (64 mm) pilothouse

USS Benton was an ironclad river gunboat in the United States Navy during the American Civil War. She was named for American senator Thomas Hart Benton. Benton was a former center-wheel catamaran snagboat and was converted by James B. Eads, St. Louis, Missouri, in 1861 and commissioned February 24, 1862 as part of the Army's Western Gunboat Flotilla.

== Conversion from snagboat ==
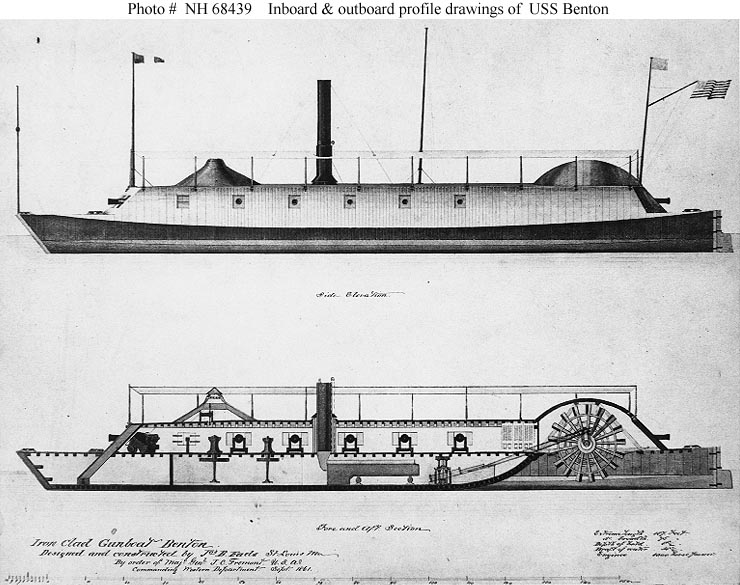
Drawing of USS Benton

On April 29, 1861 Secretary of the Navy Gideon Welles received correspondence from James Eads concerning the viability of converting Submarine No. 7 into a riverine warship for the U.S. military. Submarine No. 7 was a snagboat built by the US Navy that had been purchased by Eads' Missouri Wrecking Company and modified to raise sunken steamboats on the Mississippi River.

Both hulls of Submarine No. 7 were divided into 7 watertight compartments and Eads argued that the vessel could suffer up to 20 penetrating shot into 4 of these compartments and still stay afloat. (Other sources state she was built with 40 watertight compartments.) He argued that the vessel would be able to support a strong battery of 32-pounder cannons. His initial proposal called converting the vessel into a Cotton-clad gunboat for a cost of $3,000 in cotton. His letter also described a plan to convert two other, smaller vessels and to create a naval base at Cairo, Illinois.

Lacking the resources to undertake the project, Welles forwarded Eads's letter to the Secretary of War Simon Cameron. Cameron was impressed by the proposal and forwarded it to General George McClellan to implement the construction of the base. Instead of the cotton-clad boat however, the US Army wanted a fleet of new ships; this became the City-class ironclad fleet.

Eads earned several additional contracts after impressing the authorities with his abilities during the construction of the City-class. One of the vessels involved was Submarine No. 7. Eads widened the lower deck of Submarine No. 7 into a gun deck then added a second tier of accommodations. The large size of the finished vessel and this additional space led to the vessel being well suited to a flagship role. Commander William D. Porter complained that the finished vessel was too slow, and history has recorded that Eads replied that she was still fast enough to fight in. Now as the Benton, she would serve as a flagship for most of the war.

== Armament ==
Like many of the Mississippi theater ironclads, the Benton had her armament changed multiple times. Like the City-class, the Benton was fitted with a mixture of modern and antiquated weapons, then had her weapons upgraded as new pieces became available. Though the 9-inch (230 mm) smoothbore guns were modern, most of the other original armaments were antiquated, such as the 32-pounders, or modified, such as the 42-pounder "rifles" that were in fact old smoothbores that had been gouged out to give them rifling. These modified weapons were of particular concern to military commanders because they were structurally weaker and more prone to exploding than purpose-built rifled guns. Additionally, the close confines of riverine combat greatly increased the threat of boarding parties. The 12-pounder howitzer was equipped to address that concern and was not used in regular combat. By the end of the war, the Benton was one of the heaviest armed vessels in the Mississippi theater.

Ordnance characteristics
February 1862	August 1862	January 1863	December 1863
• 2 × D. 9-inch smoothbores • 7 × J. 42-pounder rifles • 7 × D. 32-pounder rifles	• 2 × D. 9-inch smoothbores • 2 × D. 50-pounder rifle • 4 × J. 42-pounder rifles • 8 × D. 32-pounder rifles • 1 × D. 12-pounder howitzer	• 4 × D. 9-inch smoothbores • 2 × D. 50-pounder rifle • 4 × J. 42-pounder rifles • 6 × D. 32-pounder rifles • 1 × D. 12-pounder howitzer	• 8 × D. 9-inch smoothbores • 2 × P. 100-pounder rifle • 2 × D. 50-pounder rifle • 4 × D. 32-pounder rifles • 1 × D. 12-pounder howitzer

== Commanding officers ==
In addition to intermittently hosting both Admirals Andrew Foote and David Porter, the Benton had several commanding officers over the duration of her service.

Commanding Officers and Ship Masters
U.S. Navy Rank	Name (First, Last)	Command Dates
• Lieutenant Commander • Lieutenant Commander • Lieutenant • Lieutenant Commander • Lieutenant • Lieutenant Commander	• Seth Ledyard Phelps • William Gwin • George P. Lord • James A. Greer • John Scott • Edward Y. McCauley	• Mar–Sep. 1862 • Oct–Dec. 1862 • Jan–Feb. 1863 • Mar. 1863 – Sep. 1864 • May-Oct. 1864 • Nov. 1864 – Jul 1865

== Service history ==
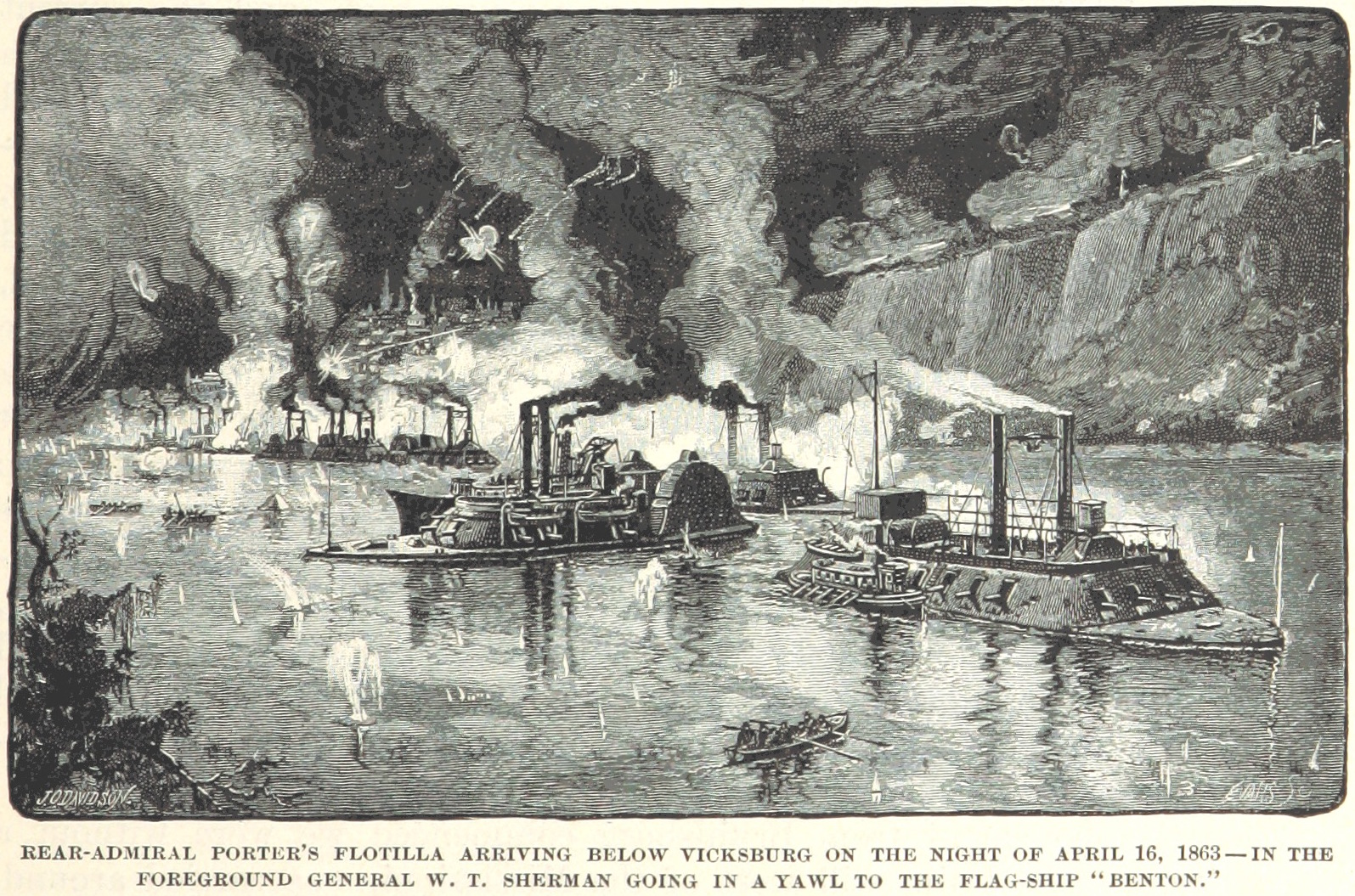
General William Tecumseh Sherman rows out to the Benton after it arrives below Vicksburg

As part of Admiral Andrew Foote's command, she participated in the Battle of Island Number Ten in March–April. On 10 May, she was present for the Battle of Plum Point Bend where a Confederate ram flotilla ambushed the fleet, sinking the Cincinnati and the Mound City before being driven off. On June 6, Benton and the fleet, now supported by a flotilla of Union rams under the command of Colonel Charles Ellet, Jr. engaged the Confederate rams in the First Battle of Memphis where the Confederate flotilla was completely routed. In July the Benton led the fleet into an attempted engagement with the CSS Arkansas near Vicksburg, Mississippi. The attempt was a failure and Benton and the fleet were forced to retreat north of the city for the rest of the year. In October, the entire fleet was transferred from Army command to Navy command. Benton spent the remainder of the year patrolling the Yazoo River.

On April 16, under the direction of Admiral David Porter, the Benton led a nighttime charge past the guns of Vicksburg. Protecting the Ivy from cannon fire, the Benton led a column of ten additional vessels past the heavy artillery batteries. Passing at a range of 800-yard (730 m) the Benton was hit 5 times, including 1 10-inch (250 mm) round that split her casemate, injuring several crewmen. on April 29 the Benton led a 7 ironclad fleet in a bombardment of Grand Gulf, MS's gun batteries. One particularly devastating hit pierced the Benton's armor, causing 25 casualties. As the battle continued, the speed of the current increased and overwhelmed the Benton's engines and she was swept downstream before the bombardment's conclusion. In May, Benton returned to Vickburg to continue bombarding the city until its fall in June.

On March 10, the Benton led a large fleet up the Red River to aid the Army in subduing Shreveport, LA. This expedition was a failure. On March 12, according to Admiral Porter's memoirs "Incidents and Anecdotes of the Civil War" the Benton fired one volley from her bow battery during the Battle of Fort DeRussy before that fort's surrender to Union General A.J. Smith. By May, the army was defeated in combat and forced to retreat, and the fleet was stranded on the river after the water levels fell too low to allow the fleet to retreat back to the Mississippi. The fleet was ultimately saved by building dams across low points in the river. Once the water level was high enough, the dams were destroyed and the fleet was able to escape on the rush of high water.

By the end of the war, most of the action had been resolved in the western theater. Her last significant action was to steam back up the Red River in June to take possession of the surrendered CSS Missouri. Benton decommissioned July 20, 1865 at Mound City, Illinois. Her armor and armament were removed and she was sold November 29, 1865.

== Bibliography ==
- Konstam, Angus, New Vanguard 56, Union River Ironclad 1861-65, Osprey Publishing, 2002. ISBN 978-1-84176-444-3
- Donovan, Frank, Ironclads of the Civil War, American Heritage, 1964.
- (History and some images)
- (Additional images)
