= Charles Stewart McCauley =

American naval officer (1793–1869)

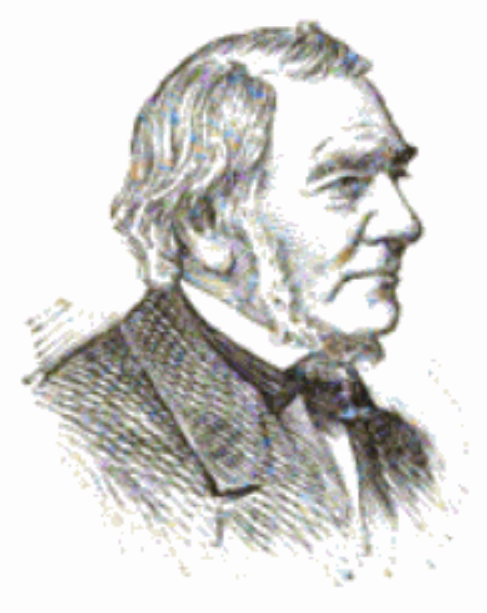
- Born: February 3, 1793; Philadelphia, PA
- Died: May 21, 1869 (aged 76); Washington, D.C.
- Relatives: Admiral Charles Stewart (uncle)
- Military career
- Allegiance: United States of America; Union
- Branch: United States Navy; Union Navy
- Service years: 1809–1861
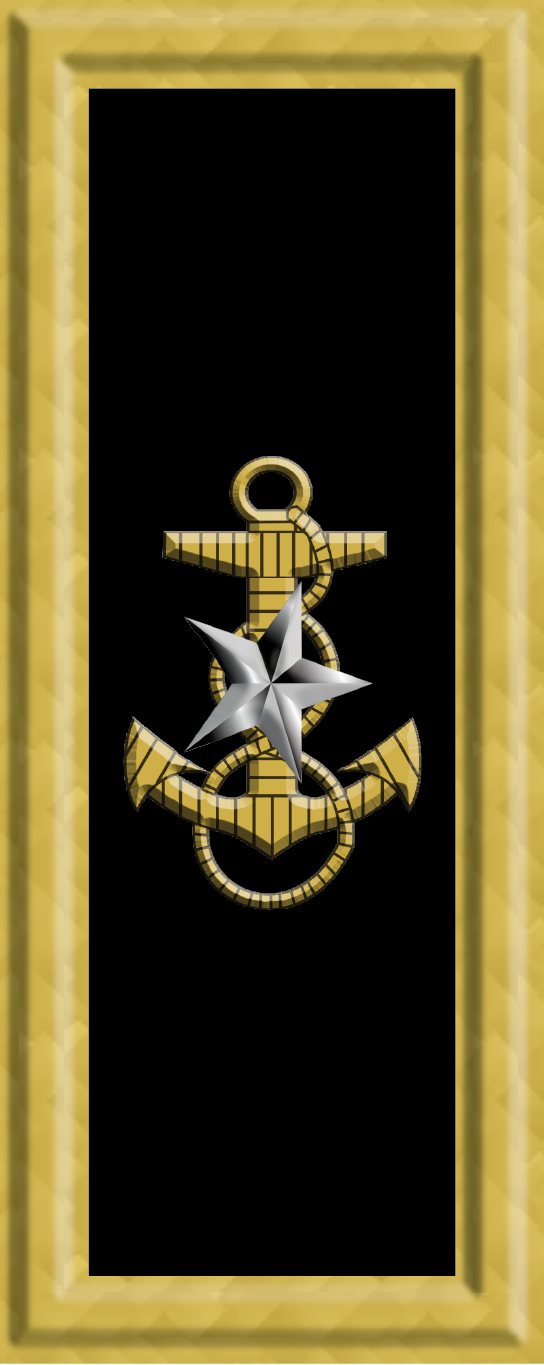
- Rank: Commodore

Charles Stewart McCauley (February 3, 1793 – May 21, 1869) was an American naval officer in the War of 1812 and the Civil War.

== Biography ==
McCauley was born in Philadelphia, Pennsylvania, in the decade after the American Revolution and educated in the city's schools. He entered the U.S. Navy as a midshipman in 1809 and subsequently fought in the War of 1812. He served on the Constellation in 1813, and took part in the gunboat attack on the British naval frigate Narcissus in Hampton Roads, and in the defense of Craney Island. He served as acting lieutenant of the Jefferson in 1814 on Lake Ontario.

In 1823 he obtained leave of absence and commanded a vessel in the merchant marine until he returned to the Navy in 1825. Rising steadily through the ranks, he became a captain in 1839. In April 1855, McCauley was placed in command of the home squadron. He was directed by the Secretary of the Navy to go to Cuba to protect American interests. For his success in this he was publicly complimented on his return in June by President Franklin Pierce at a dinner at the White House. In 1860 he was ordered to the command of the Gosport Ship Yard.

Upon the outbreak of the American Civil War in 1861 he destroyed a large number of ships and property there, to prevent its falling into the hands of the Confederate States of America. However, this effort was largely unsuccessful. Nearly 2,000 cannon and several of the scuttled warships, including the USS Merrimack, were captured and returned to service by the Confederates. He was placed on the retired list on December 21, 1861, and promoted to commodore.

Four years after the end of the Civil War, McCauley died at his home in Washington, D.C.

== Family ==
McCauley was a nephew of Admiral Charles Stewart (1778–1869). He was an uncle of Rear Admiral Edward Yorke McCauley (1827–1894).
