= USS Ivy =

Gunboat of the United States Navy

History

United States
- Ordered: as Terror
- Laid down: date unknown
- Launched: 1862
- Acquired: 30 September 1862
- In service: September 1862
- Out of service: 1865
- Fate: Sold, 17 August 1865

General characteristics
- Displacement: 50 tons
- Length: not known
- Beam: not known
- Draught: 10 ft (3.0 m)
- Propulsion: steam engine; screw-propelled
- Speed: 10 knots
- Complement: not known
- Armament: not known

USS Ivy was a steamer acquired by the Union Navy during the American Civil War.

She was assigned by the Navy as a gunboat to patrol navigable waterways of the Confederacy to prevent the South from trading with other countries. Ivy also was assigned the role of tugboat and dispatch boat; towards the end of the war she was assigned the role of coal barge tender.

== Built in St. Louis, Missouri in 1862 ==
Ivy, a screw tug, was built as Terror by the Army at St. Louis, Missouri, in 1862; transferred to the Navy 30 September 1862 and renamed Ivy.

== Civil War operations ==
=== Assigned to the Mississippi Squadron ===
Assigned to the Mississippi Squadron, Ivy took part as tugboat and dispatch boat in the winter operations around Vicksburg 1862–63. In the important attack on Fort Hindman 9–11 January 1863, she served as Rear Admiral David D. Porter's flagship.

As the more powerful gunboats pounded the fort in support of General William Tecumseh Sherman's attack, Ivy came alongside both USS Cincinnati and USS Louisville to help quench fires started by shore fire. In a memorandum in the office of Secretary of the Navy, Gideon Welles noted:

The officers and crew behaved with great coolness, though under a brisk fire of musketry.

The naval attack, directed from Ivy, resulted in Sherman's capture of the fort, a severe blow to the Confederate cause in the West.

=== Passing under the lethal Vicksburg batteries on the Mississippi ===
Ivy was also present for the passage of the Vicksburg, Mississippi, batteries by Admiral David Dixon Porter's ships 16–17 April 1863. Lashed to the side of the powerful USS Benton, Ivy steamed boldly past Vicksburg, opening operations south of the city to Porter and contributing importantly to the fall of Grand Gulf and eventually to the capture of Vicksburg.

In May the tug accompanied the gunboats up the Red River. The ships reached abandoned Fort De Russy 5 May and 2 days later took Alexandria, only to be forced back downstream by low water. The fort was partially destroyed and Porter returned to Grand Gulf to continue the assault on Vicksburg.

The tug remained near Vicksburg, often as Porter's flagship, until after its fall 4 July 1863, and subsequently acted as a dispatch boat and tug on the river and as a receiving ship for prisoners of war. Ivy entered the Red River again in 1864 when the major part of Admiral Porter's fleet was caught by low water above the rapids at Alexandria. She assisted gunboat Ozark over the rapids 13 May 1864 and returned to the Mississippi River with the fleet amid frequent Confederate attacks from shore.

=== Final operations of the war and decommissioning ===
For the remainder of the war Ivy was used to tend and pump coal barges at Donaldsonville, Louisiana. She was sold at Mound City, Illinois, 17 August 1865 to W. G. Priest.
