= Charles Wilkes =

American explorer (1798–1877)

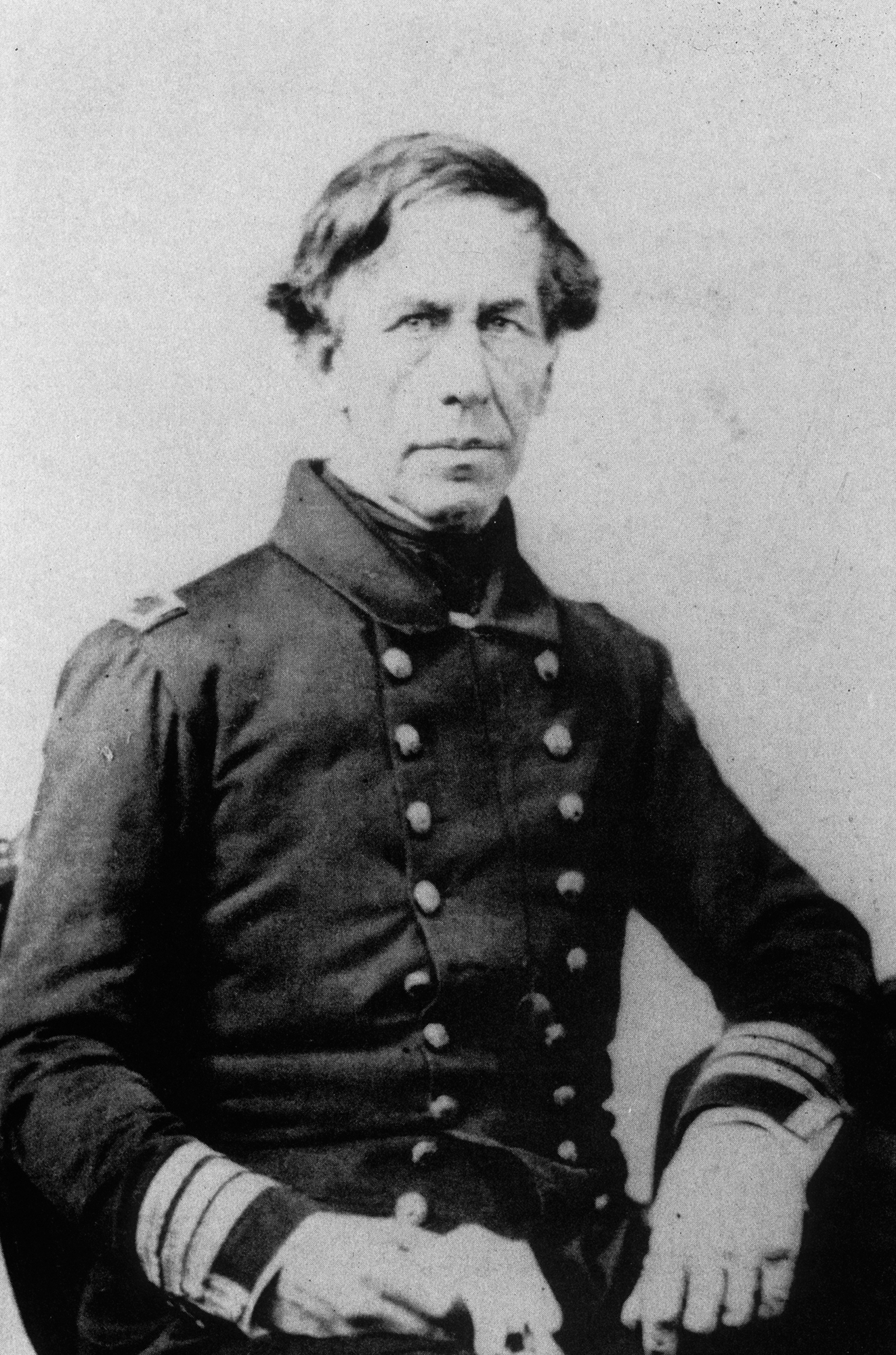
- Born: April 3, 1798; New York City, U.S.
- Died: February 8, 1877 (aged 78); Washington, D.C., U.S.
- Resting place: Oak Hill Cemetery (originally); Arlington National Cemetery
- Known for: US Exploring Expedition; Trent Affair
- Military career
- Spouse(s): Jane Renwick (m. 1826–1848) Mary Lynch Bolton (m. 1854–1877)
- Children: 6
- Allegiance: United States
- Branch: United States Navy
- Years: 1818–1866
- Rank: Rear admiral
- Commands: USS San Jacinto; USS Wachusett; USS Tioga; USS Sonoma
- Wars: American Civil War

Signature
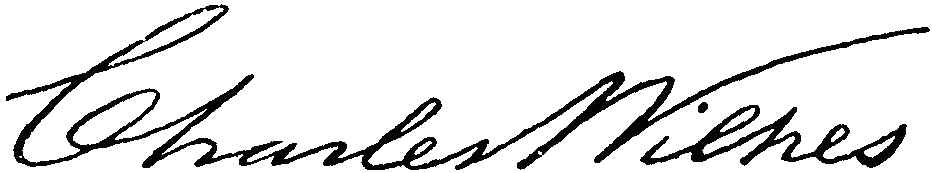

Charles Wilkes (April 3, 1798 – February 8, 1877) was an American naval officer, ship's captain, and explorer. He led the first United States Exploring Expedition (1838–1842). During the American Civil War (1861-1865), he commanded USS San Jacinto during the Trent Affair incident in which he stopped a British Royal Mail ship and forcibly removed two Confederate diplomats, almost leading to war between the United States and United Kingdom.

== Early life and career ==
Coat of Arms of Charles Wilkes

Wilkes was born in New York City on April 3, 1798, the great nephew of former Lord Mayor of London John Wilkes. His mother, Mary Seton Wilkes, died in 1802 when Charles was just three years old. As a result, Charles was raised and home-tutored by his aunt, Elizabeth Ann Seton, who was fluent in French from her own upbringing in New Rochelle, New York in a French Huguenot settlement. Charles also became fluent in French, which served him well throughout his career, including an extended stay in Europe (1830-1831). His fluency was also demonstrated during exploration of Puget Sound in 1841 with French-speaking guide Simon Plamondon. Since Elizabeth Seton was the widowed mother of five, Charles was early on sent to a boarding school, then on to Columbia College (present-day Columbia University).

== Career ==
Wilkes entered the United States Navy as a midshipman in 1818, and became a lieutenant in 1826. Based on the experience he gained in the nautical charting of Narragansett Bay (1833), he was placed in charge of the Navy's Department of Charts and Instruments, out of which developed the Naval Observatory and Hydrographic Office. The standards set here were to be invaluable during the United States Exploring Expedition of 1838-1842, which set a physical oceanography benchmark for the Office's first superintendent, Matthew Fontaine Maury, to maintain. Wilkes was elected to the American Philosophical Society in 1843.

== Columbian Institute ==
During the 1820s, Wilkes was a member of the prestigious Columbian Institute for the Promotion of Arts and Sciences, counting among its members Presidents Andrew Jackson and John Quincy Adams and many prominent men of the day - including well-known representatives of the military, government service, medicine, and other professions.

== The Exploring Expedition ==
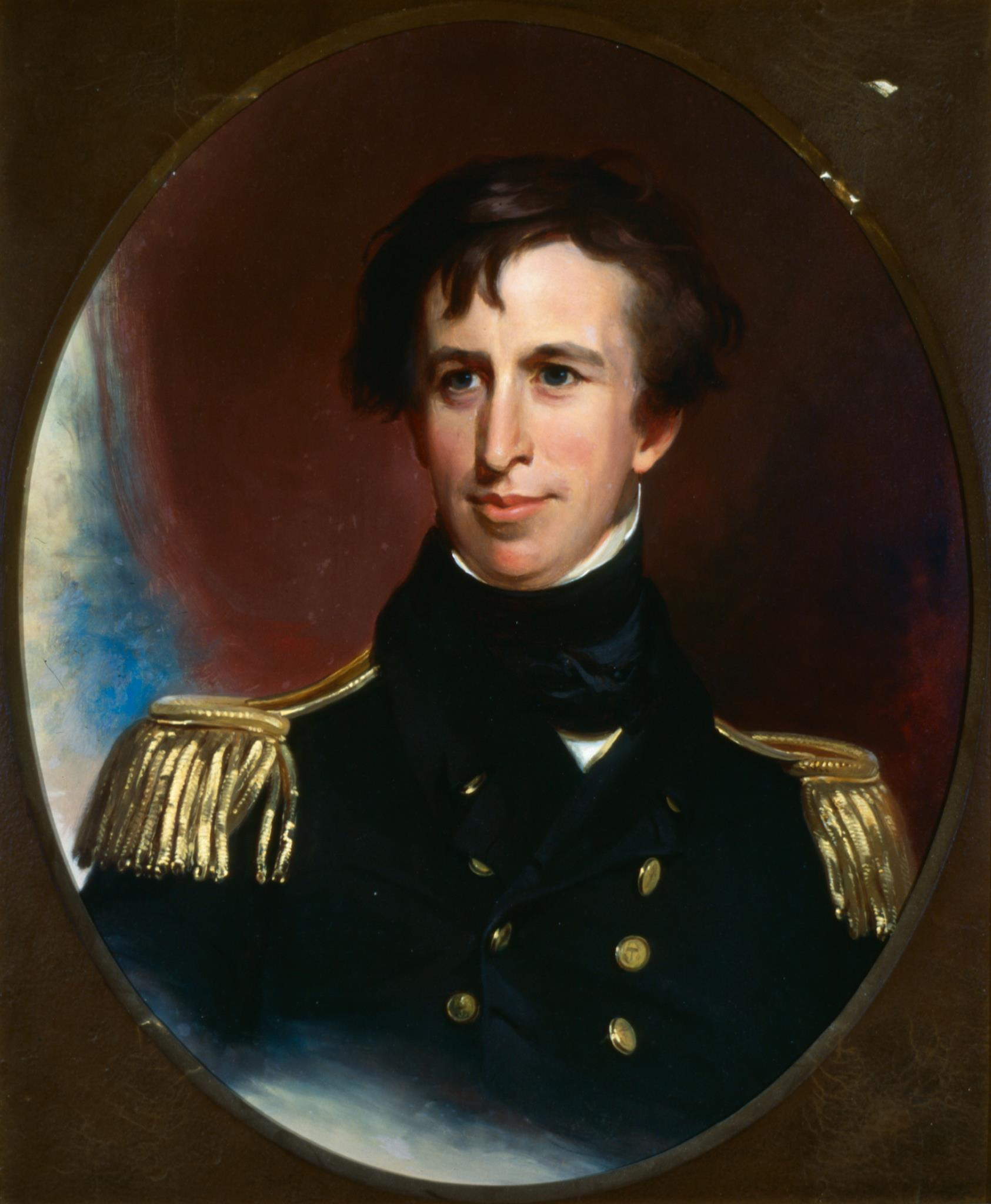
Lieutenant Charles Wilkes, Exploring Expedition 1838–1842

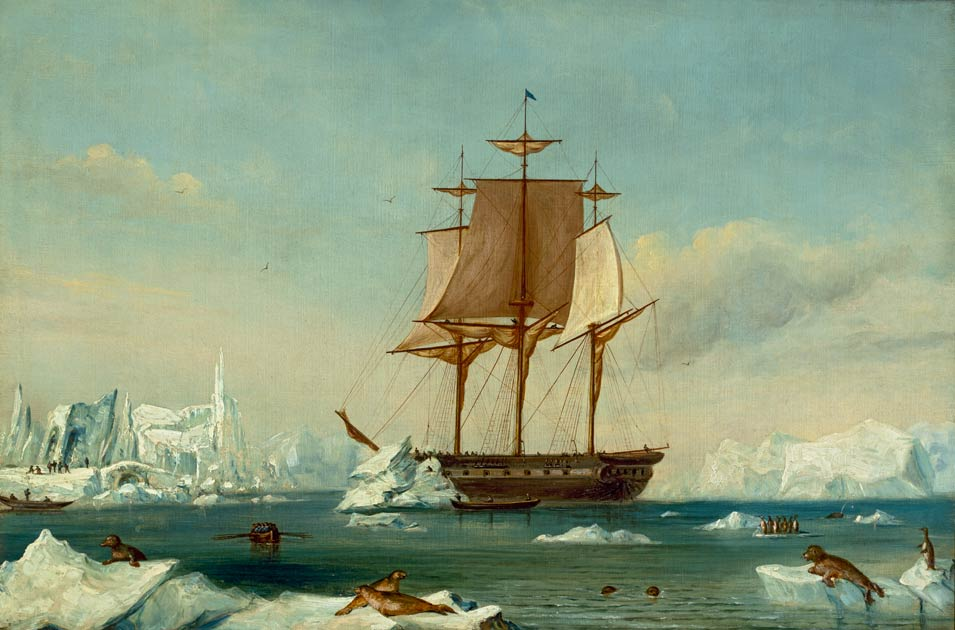
USS Vincennes in Disappointment Bay, Antarctica, during the Wilkes Expedition.

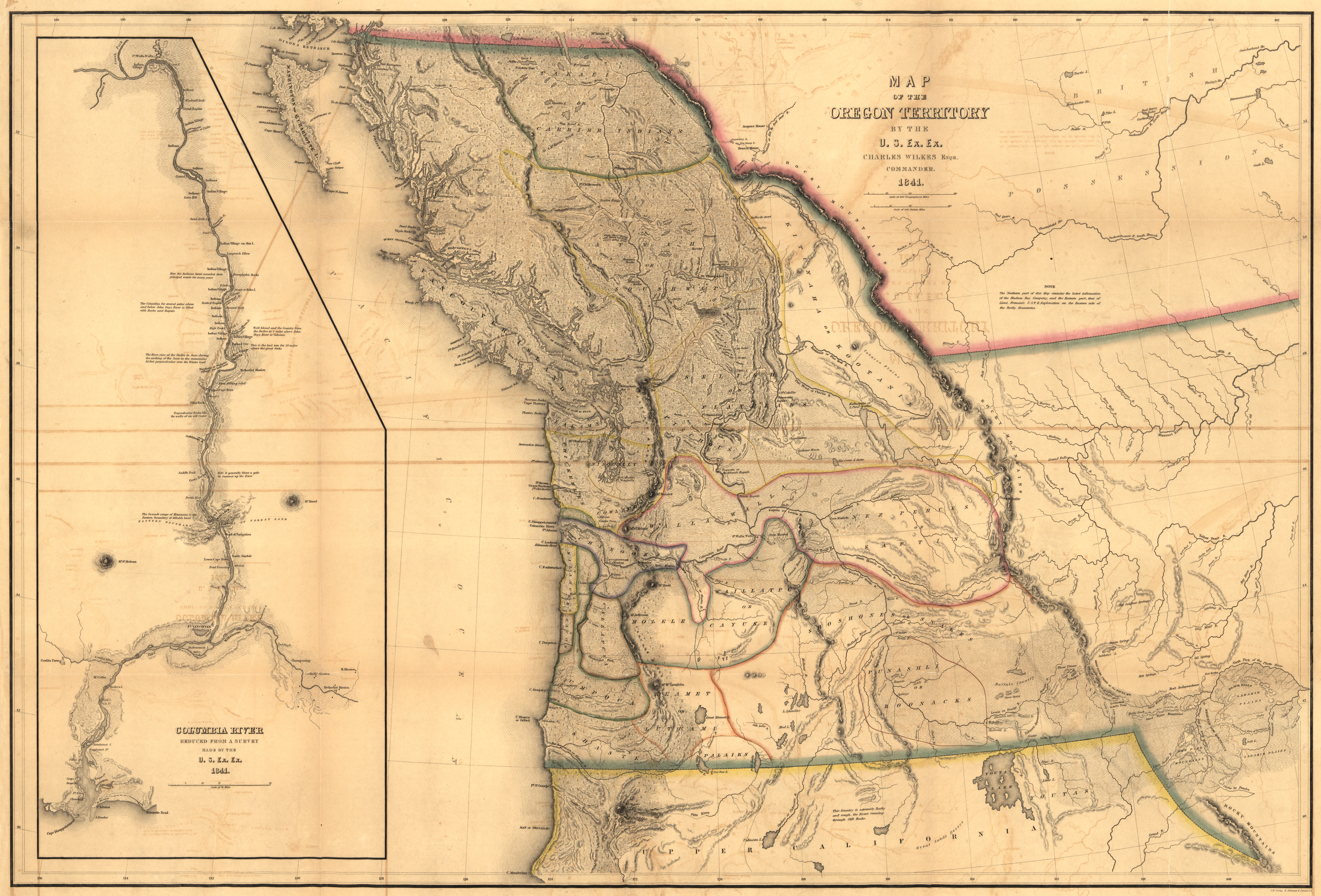
Pacific Northwest: 1841 Map of the Oregon Territory from Narrative of the United States Exploring Expedition

In 1838, Wilkes, although not yet a seasoned naval line officer, was experienced in nautical survey work and collaborating with civilian scientists. With this background, he was given command of the government's first Exploring Expedition: "...for the purpose of exploring and surveying the Southern Ocean, ... as well to determine the existence of all doubtful islands and shoals, as to discover, and accurately fix, the position of those which [lay] in or near the track of our vessels in that quarter, and [might] have escaped the observation of scientific navigators." The U.S. Exploring Expedition was authorized by an act of Congress on May 18, 1836.

The Exploring Expedition, commonly known as the 'Wilkes Expedition' and the American Exploratory Expedition (or the American Ex. Ex. by many) included naturalists, botanists, taxidermists, artists, a mineralogist, and a philologist. Vessels in the Expedition were USS Vincennes (780 tons) and USS Peacock (650 tons), the brig USS Porpoise (230 tons), the store-ship USS Relief, and two schooners, USS Sea Gull (110 tons) and USS Flying Fish (96 tons). Departing from Hampton Roads, Chesapeake Bay on August 18, 1838, the expedition stopped at the Madeira Islands and Rio de Janeiro; visited Tierra del Fuego, Chile, Peru, the Tuamotu archipelago, Samoa, and New South Wales, Australia. In December 1839, they sailed from Sydney into the Antarctic Ocean where, west of the Balleny Islands, they sighted the coast of Antarctica on January 25, 1840. After charting 1500 miles of Antarctic coastline, the expedition went on to Fiji. There, the expedition kidnapped the chief Ro Veidovi, charging him with the murder of American whalers. July 1840 on Malolo Island, two sailors (one of whom was Wilkes' nephew Midshipman Wilkes Henry) were killed while bartering for food. Wilkes' retribution was swift and severe. According to an old man from Malolo Island, some 80 Fijians were killed in the incident.

The expedition then sailed on to the Hawaiian Islands. From December 1840 to March 1841, he employed hundreds of native Hawaiian porters and many of his own men to haul a pendulum to the summit of Mauna Loa to measure gravity. Instead of using the existing footpath, he blazed his own trail, taking much longer than anticipated. The conditions on the mountain reminded him of Antarctica: many of his crew suffering from snow blindness, altitude sickness, and foot injuries caused by shoes that had been torn on the sharp lava rock. While in Hawai'i the Expedition made the first measurements of the height of the islands' major mountains and created nautical charts of the coastlines. These charts were in use up to World War II.

In 1841 the Exploring Expedition went on to the West Coast of North America, exploring the Strait of Juan de Fuca, Puget Sound, the Columbia River, San Francisco Bay, and the Sacramento River. The first American Independence Day celebration west of the Mississippi River was held at Dupont, Washington, on July 5, 1841. The expedition then sailed to the Ellice Islands (now known as Tuvalu), visiting Funafuti, Nukufetau and Vaitupu. The expedition returned to the U.S. East Coast by way of Borneo, Singapore, the Philippines, the Sulu Archipelago, Polynesia and the Cape of Good Hope, reaching New York on June 10, 1842.

After having circumnavigated the earth, the last U.S. all-sail naval mission to do so, the Expedition had logged some 87,000 miles, losing two ships and 28 men. Upon his return, Wilkes was court-martialed for the loss of one of his ships on the bar at the mouth of the Columbia River, for the general mistreatment of his subordinate officers, and for excessive punishment of his sailors. A major witness against him was ship doctor Charles Guillou. He was acquitted on all charges except for excessive punishment of men in his squadron. For a short time, he was attached to the U.S. Coast Survey, but from 1844 to 1861, he was chiefly engaged in preparing the official report on the Exploring Expedition.

His Narrative of the United States Exploring Expedition (5 volumes and an atlas) was published in 1844. He edited the scientific reports of the Expedition (19 volumes and 11 atlases, 1844–1874) and was the author of Vol. XI (Meteorology) and Vol. XXIII (Hydrography). Alfred Thomas Agate, engraver and illustrator, was the designated portrait and botanical artist of the expedition. His work was used to illustrate the Narrative of the United States Exploring Expedition. The Narrative contains much interesting material concerning the manners, customs, political and economic conditions of the people in many places then little known. Wilkes' 1841 Map of the Oregon Territory pre-dated John Charles Fremont's first Oregon Trail pathfinder expedition guided by Kit Carson during 1842.

Other valuable contributions include James Dwight Dana's three studies on Zoophytes (1846), Geology (1849) and Crustacea (1852–1854). Moreover, the specimens and artifacts brought back by Expedition scientists led to the founding of the Smithsonian Institution collection. In addition to many shorter articles and reports, Wilkes published the major scientific works Western America, including California and Oregon (1849) and Voyage Round the World: embracing the principal events of the narrative of the United States Exploring Expedition in one volume: illustrated with one hundred and seventy-eight engravings on wood (1849), and Theory of the Winds (1856).

== Civil War ==
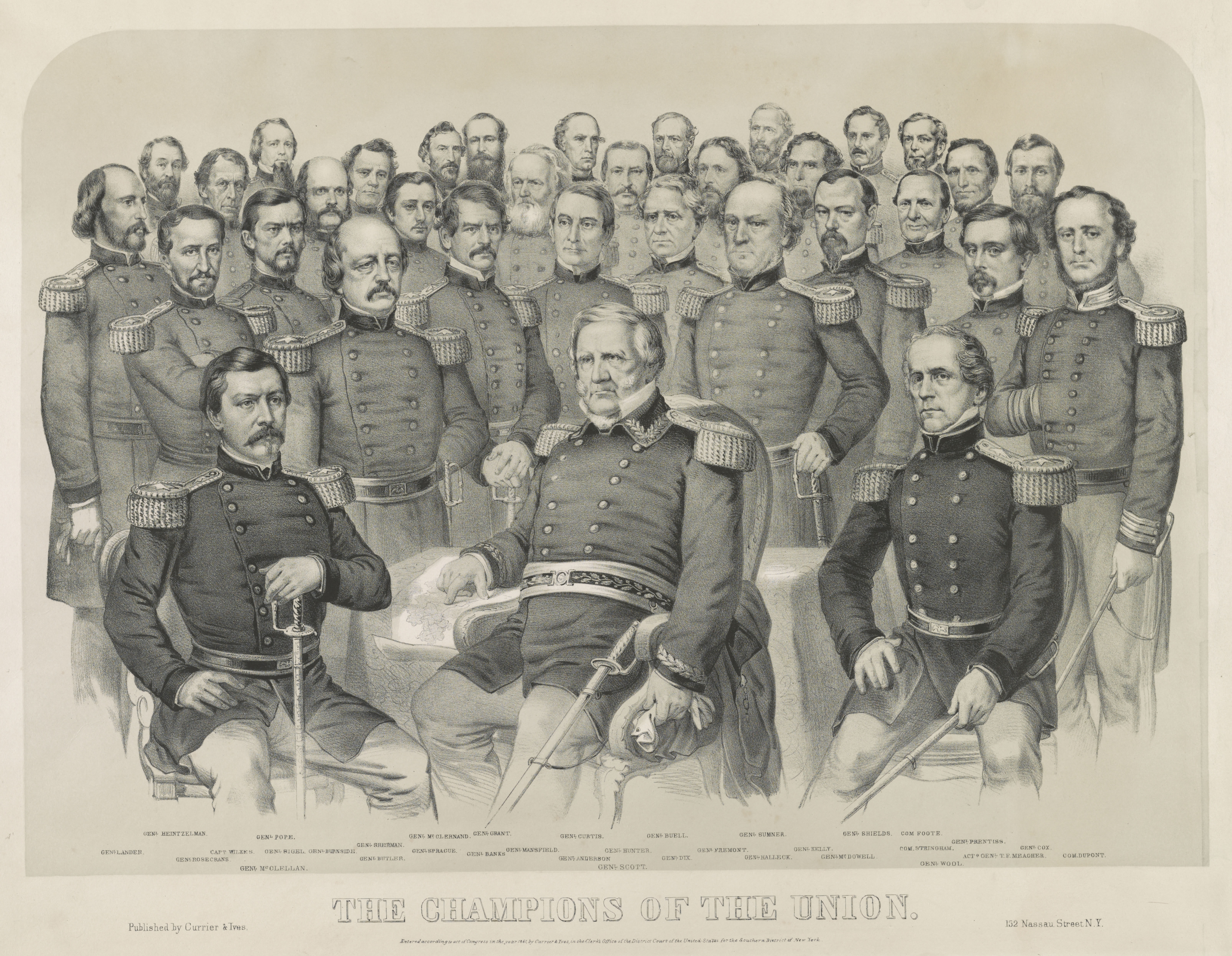
Capt. Charles Wilkes in The Champions of the Union, lithograph by Currier & Ives, 1861

Wilkes was promoted to the rank of Commander in 1843 and then Captain in 1855. At the outbreak of the American Civil War, he was assigned command of the USS San Jacinto with the mission to search for the Confederate Coast and Geodetic Survey commerce destroyer CSS Sumter.

=== Trent Affair ===
In 1861, he visited the British colony of Bermuda as part of his assigned duties. Wilkes, acting on orders, remained in port aboard the flagship USS Wachusett for nearly a week, violating the British rule permitting American naval vessels (of either side) to remain in port for only a single day. While Wilkes was in port, the USS Tioga and USS Sonoma, gunboats under his command, blockaded St. George's harbor, a key Confederate blockade runner base. Wilkes learned that James Murray Mason and John Slidell, two Confederate commissioners, one assigned to Britain and the other to France, were bound for Europe on the British packet boat, RMS Trent. He ordered the steam frigate San Jacinto to stop them. On November 8, 1861, San Jacinto met the Trent and fired two shots across its bow, forcing it to stop. The Trent was boarded, Mason and Slidell arrested, thus perpetrating a further violation of British neutrality. The two diplomats were summarily taken to Fort Warren in Boston Harbor. The actions of "The Notorious Wilkes," as Bermuda media branded him, were contrary to maritime law and caused many British sympathizers to think full-scale war between the United States and England was inevitable. Congress officially thanked Wilkes "for his brave, adroit and patriotic conduct". However, his action was later disavowed by President Lincoln who had received diplomatic protests from the British government. Mason and Slidell were speedily released. On December 21, 1861, Wilkes was placed on the retirement list. Yet, after receiving the rank of Commodore on July 16, 1862, he was reassigned to duty pursuing blockade runners in the West Indies.

=== West Indies Squadron ===
As Commander of the West Indies Squadron, Wilkes repeatedly complained of having an insufficient force. Though he had a degree of success in the capture of blockade runners, he drew criticism for failing in his primary task: the capture of the commerce raiders CSS Alabama and CSS Florida. He also repeatedly exacerbated diplomatic relations with the British, Spanish, Dutch, French, Danish and Mexican provincial governments through his high-handed actions. In violation of international law regarding belligerent nations, he set up coal depots on a number of neutral islands, consequently being sighted lingering outside neutral ports. The British, in particular, accused him of establishing blockades off the ports of Nassau and St. George's, suspicious that he had been sent to intentionally insult them. The French also accused him of blockading Martinique.

Wilkes justified his actions by suggesting the ports were tantamount to operational bases for blockade runners. His capture of such ships as the Peterhoff, Dolphin, Springbok, and Victor resulted in diplomatic objections explicitly directed against Wilkes' quality of leadership. In June 1863 he was recalled from the West Indies. Wilkes' failure to capture the assigned Confederate commerce raiders certainly was a factor for his recall, as was his detention of the USS Vanderbilt for use as his flagship, overriding her commander's specific orders to hunt down the CSS Alabama off the coast of Brazil. As significant as these points were, his removal from command seemed to be the never-ending stream of complaints over his actions coming from neutral nations.

=== Court martial ===
Though the Secretary of the Navy Gideon Welles supported Wilkes in many of his West Indies actions, Wilkes frequently found himself in open conflict with Welles. The Secretary suggested Wilkes was too old to receive the rank of Commodore under the legislation then governing military promotions. In Welles' December 1863 annual report, he severely criticized Wilkes over the retention of the Vanderbilt. Wilkes wrote a scathing response which found its way into newspapers. A court of inquiry accused Wilkes of responsibility for its publication, and Wilkes was brought before a March 1864 Court-martial. The charges he faced were disobedience of orders, insubordination, disrespect of a superior officer, disobedience of naval regulations, and conduct unbecoming an officer. He was found guilty of all charges and sentenced to public reprimand and suspension from service for three years. However, President Lincoln reduced the suspension to one year, and the balance of charges were dropped. On July 25, 1866, he was promoted to the rank of Rear Admiral on the retired list.

== Later life ==
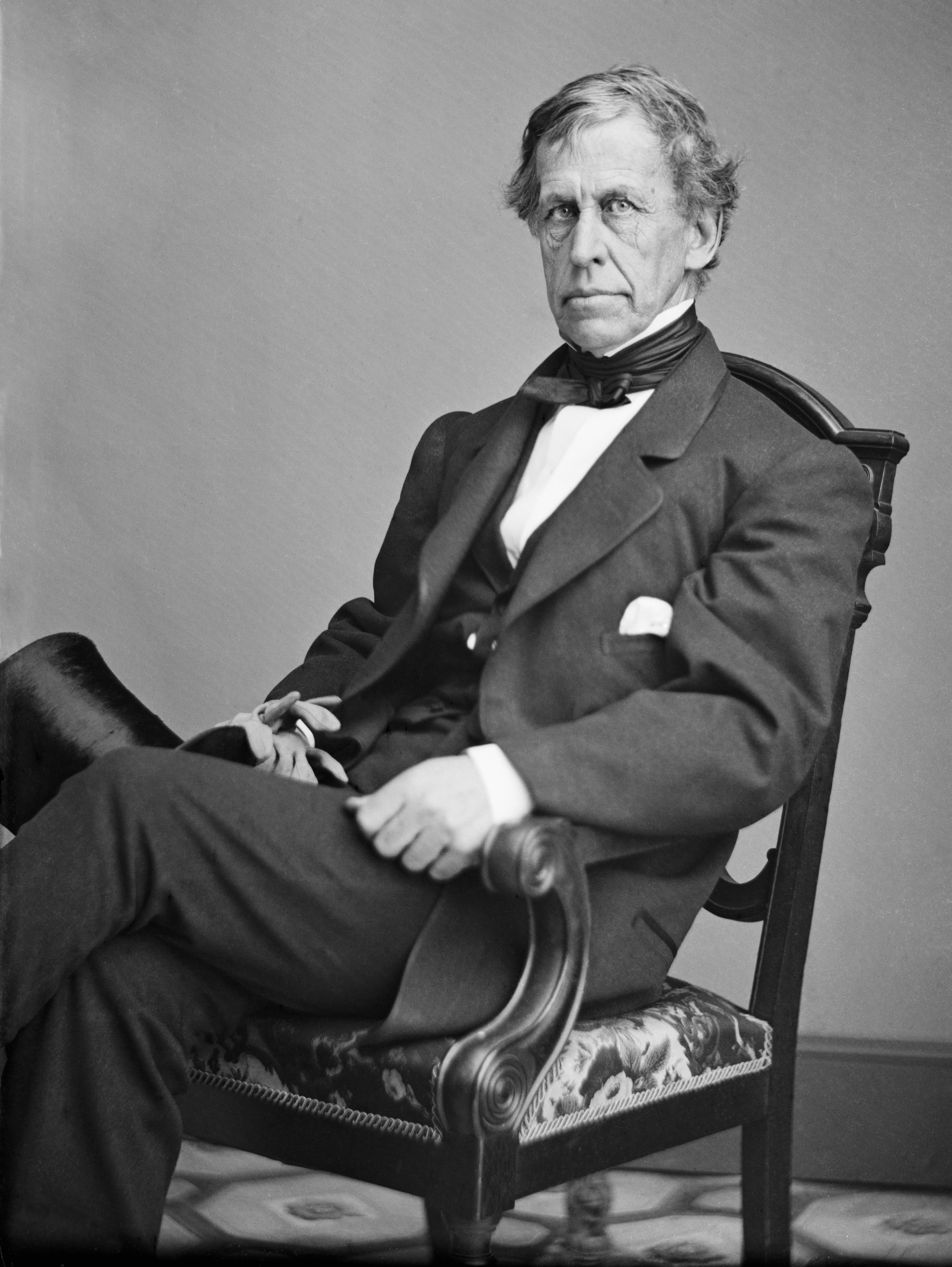
Admiral Charles Wilkes, retired

One historian speculated that Wilkes' obsessive behavior and harsh code of shipboard discipline influenced Herman Melville's characterization of Captain Ahab in Moby-Dick. Such speculation is not mentioned in the United States Navy historical archives.

In addition to his contribution to United States naval history and scientific study in his official Narrative of the Exploring Expedition (6 volumes), Wilkes also wrote an autobiography.

Wilkes died in Washington, D.C. having achieved the rank of Rear Admiral. His funeral was held at St. John's Episcopal Church, Lafayette Square. He was originally buried in Oak Hill Cemetery (Washington, D.C.), but in August 1909 the United States moved his remains to Arlington National Cemetery. His gravestone says, "He discovered the Ant-arctic continent [sic]."

== Family ==
Wilkes married twice. In 1826, he married Jane Renwick, who died in 1848; they were the parents of four children. In 1854, he married Mary Lynch Bolton; they were married until his death and were the parents of two children. Wilkes's descendants included granddaughter Bessie Wilkes, the wife of Brigadier General Henry Delp Styer and mother of Lieutenant General Wilhelm Delp Styer.

== Legacy ==
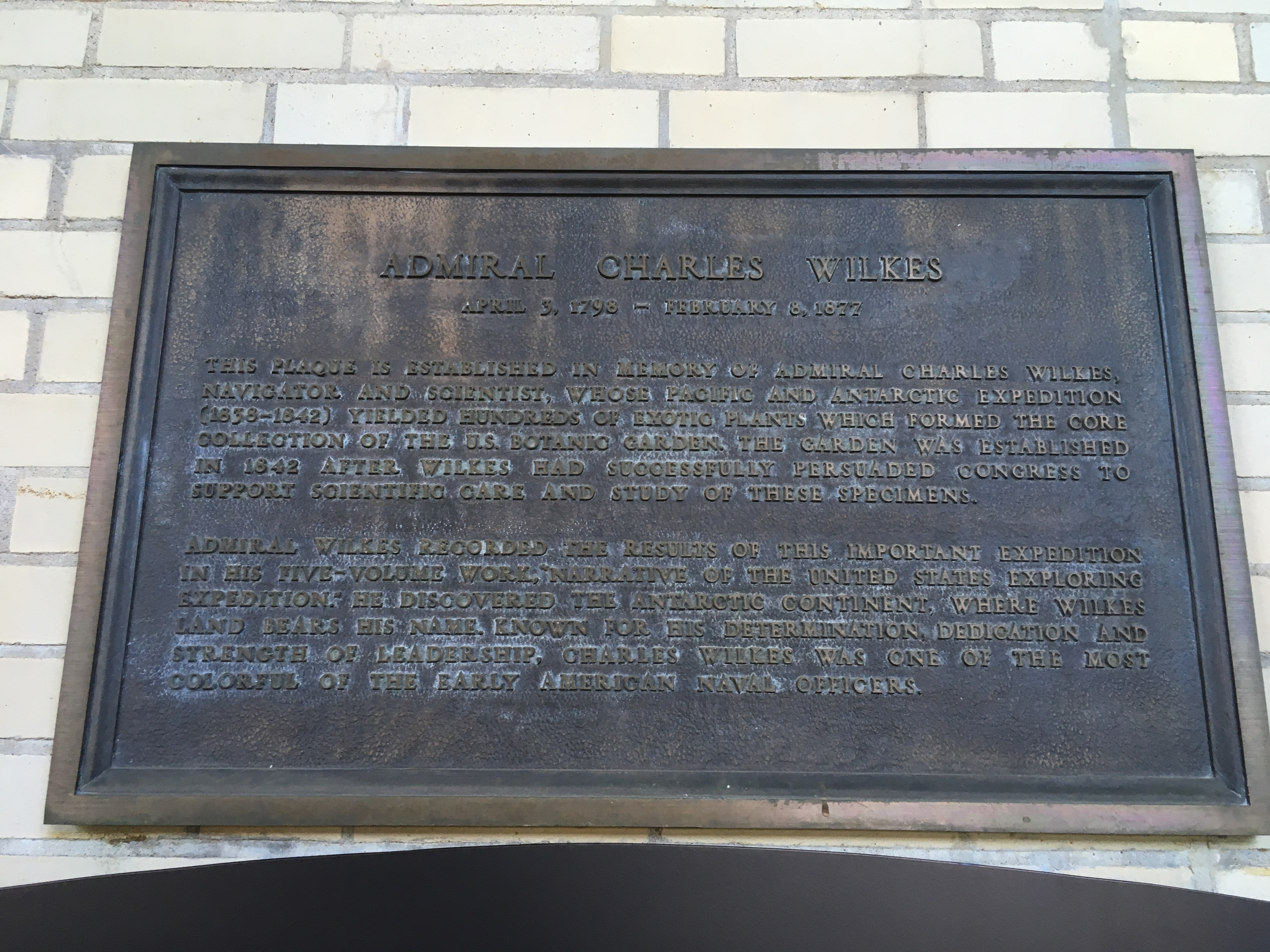
Plaque at National Arboretum

- The United States Navy named three ships for Wilkes:

Torpedo boat USS Wilkes (TB-35) serving around the turn of the 20th-century
Destroyer USS Wilkes (DD-67) serving in World War I
Destroyer USS Wilkes (DD-441) serving in World War II.

- An oceanographic survey vessel, the USS Wilkes (T-AGS-33), was launched in 1969 with the sponsorship of Mrs. Hollis Lyons Joy (Deborah Wilkes Joy), Wilkes' great-granddaughter.
- Wilkes Land in Antarctica is named after him.
- In 1923, Wilkes Island, one of the three islands surrounding the lagoon at Wake Atoll, was named for Wilkes by Alexander Wetmore who was the lead scientist of the Tanager Expedition.
- Captain Charles Wilkes Elementary School in Bainbridge Island, Washington was named in his honor. It was renamed to x̌alilc (Halilts) Elementary School in 2023 with mixed public reception.
- Wilkes Boulevard in Columbia, Missouri is named in his honor.
- The Hawaiian plant genus Wilkesia was named in his honor.

== Dates of rank ==
- Midshipman – 1 January 1818
- Lieutenant – 28 April 1826
- Commander – 13 July 1843
- Captain – 14 September 1855
- Retired List, 21 December 1861
- Commodore, Retired List – 16 July 1862
- Rear Admiral, Retired List – 6 August 1866

== Publications ==
- Voyage Round the World: Embracing the Principal Events of the Narrative of the United States. George W. Gorton. 1849.
- Western America, Including California and Oregon, with Maps of Those Regions ... (1849)
- Defence of Com. Charles Wilkes (1864)

== See also ==
- European and American voyages of scientific exploration

== Sources ==
External videos
- Booknotes interview with Nathaniel Philbrick on Sea of Glory: America's Voyage of Discovery, the U.S. Exploring Expedition, 1838–1842, January 25, 2004, C-SPAN

- Bixby, William (1966). The Forgotten Voyage of Charles Wilkes. New York: David McKay.
- Jeffries, William W. (1945). "The Civil War Career of Charles Wilkes". The Journal of Southern History. 11 (3): 324–348. doi:10.2307/2197811. JSTOR 2197811.
- Gurney, Alan (2002). The Race to the White Continent: Voyages to the Antarctic. W. W. Norton. ISBN 978-0-393-32321-4.
- Philbrick, Nathaniel (2003). Sea of Glory: America's Voyage of Discovery, The U.S. Exploring Expedition, 1838–1842. ISBN 978-0-14-200483-8.
- Silverberg, Robert (1968). Stormy Voyager: The Story of Charles Wilkes.
- Stilwell Jenkins, John (1852). Explorations and Adventures in and Around the Pacific and Antarctic Oceans: Being the Voyage of the U.S. Exploring Squadron, Commanded by Captain Charles Wilkes ... in 1838, 1839, 1840, 1841, and 1842; Together with Explorations and Discoveries Made by Admiral D'Urville, Captain Ross, and Other Navigators and Travellers, and an Account of the Expedition to the Dead Sea, Under Lieutenant Lynch. Hurst.
