= USS Tioga =

Gunboat of the United States Navy

History

United States
- Laid down: 1861
- Launched: 18 April 1862
- Acquired: 1862
- Commissioned: 30 June 1862
- Decommissioned: 29 June 1864
- In service: 6 June 1865
- Out of service: 8 May 1866
- Stricken: 1866 (est.)
- Fate: Sold, 15 October 1867

General characteristics
- Type: Steamer Gunboat
- Displacement: 819 tons
- Length: 209 ft (64 m)
- Beam: 34 ft 11 in (10.64 m)
- Draft: 10 ft 2 in (3.10 m)
- Depth of hold: 12 ft 3 in (3.73 m)
- Propulsion: steam engine; side wheel-propelled; double-ender
- Speed: 11.5 knots
- Complement: 105
- Armament: one 10" Dahlgren smoothbore; one 100-pounder gun; six 24-pounder howitzers

USS Tioga was a large steamer with powerful guns, acquired by the Union Navy during the American Civil War.

Tioga was used by the Union Navy as a gunboat in support of the Union Navy blockade of Confederate waterways.

== Tioga constructed at the Boston Navy Yard ==
Tioga – one of 12 double-ended steam gunboats laid down in the summer and fall of 1861 – was launched by the Boston Navy Yard on 18 April 1862; sponsored by Mrs. H. P. Grace; and commissioned on 30 June 1862, Lt. George W. Rodgers in command.

== Civil War operations ==
=== Assigned to the North Atlantic blockade ===
The double-ender sailed for Hampton Roads, Virginia, late that day, joined the North Atlantic Blockading Squadron upon her arrival there on 5 July, and promptly ascended the James River to support Union troops beleaguered in a small pocket on the north bank of the river.

=== Maintaining control of the James River for McClellan ===
Robert E. Lee's Army of Northern Virginia had recently defeated General George B. McClellan's Army of the Potomac in the Seven Days campaign and penned the Northern forces in a bridgehead at Harrison's Landing where they were protected by the guns of Union warships and fed by Federal supply ships. The Union gunboats, charged with maintaining control of the James for the North to assure the continuation of McClellan's waterborne support, constituted an independent division of the North Atlantic Blockading Squadron called the James River Flotilla.

=== One of the first ships to "screen an aircraft carrier" ===
While in the James River Flotilla, Tioga escorted supply ships and frequently exchanged fire with Southern batteries and sharpshooters ashore. One of her more unusual duties during this assignment was the chore of protecting the barge which carried and launched an observation balloon to reconnoiter Confederate positions and troop deployments. Thus, it has been claimed jocularly that she was one of the first warships to screen an aircraft carrier.

=== Supporting General McClellan and defending Washington ===
During much of August, Tioga helped to cover the movement of Union troops as McClellan evacuated the peninsula between the James and the York Rivers and transferred his troops north by water to protect Washington, D.C. After the withdrawal had been largely completed, the James River Flotilla was broken up on 29 August, with a dozen of its ships being transferred to the Potomac Flotilla and the remainder reverting to the direct control of Rear Admiral Louis M. Goldsborough, who commanded the North Atlantic Blockading Squadron. Tioga was one of the Union warships sent north to strengthen Federal control of the Potomac River and, by doing so, to beef up the Union forces afloat ready to defend Washington, D.C. At this time, General Robert E. Lee was defeating General John Pope's Army of Virginia in the Second Battle of Bull Run, greatly endangering the Federal capital.

=== Reassigned to the West India Squadron ===
However, before Tioga could become an effective part of the Potomac Flotilla, a change of orders reassigned her to the newly established West India Squadron, formed – under the command of Commodore Charles Wilkes – to counter the threat posed by the recent commissioning of the Confederate commerce raider Florida and the expected activation of the steam warship then being built for the South in England under the designation 290 which would prey on Northern shipping as Alabama. While Tioga never encountered either of these adversaries which would win renown under Confederate colors, she did compile an impressive score against blockade runners.

=== Maintaining an impressive score against blockade runners ===
She took her first prize on 14 February 1863, when she overhauled Avon and sent that English schooner to Key West, Florida, for adjudication. On 13 March, she captured another British schooner, Florence Nightingale, laden with cotton and without papers. Nine days later, she made a prize of the English side-wheel steamer Granite City. The British sloop Justina struck her colors to the gunboat on 23 April.

On 20 June, while cruising in company with USS Santiago de Cuba and USS Octorara, Tioga sighted a strange steamer; and the three Union ships gave chase. When they noticed a large quantity of cotton floating in the water, Tioga and Octorara hove to and picked up the jettisoned cargo, while Santiago de Cuba kept up the pursuit and overtook the English steamer Victory which she sent to Boston, Massachusetts, under a prize crew.

A week later, Tioga captured Julia as that English schooner attempted to slip through the Union blockade laden with cotton and rosin. On 25 September, she took Confederate steamer Herald which had escaped from the South with a cargo of cotton and naval stores.

=== Reassigned to the East Gulf Blockade ===
Three days before the gunboat made this capture, orders had left Washington to transfer Tioga to the East Gulf Blockading Squadron. After beginning her new assignment, the double-ender participated in the capture of sloop Last Trial near Key West; but thereafter she spent much of the autumn undergoing repairs at Key West.

=== Doing her best in intercepting blockade runners ===
Early the following year, she resumed her success as a bane to blockade runners. She took an unidentified schooner – laden with salt, liquors, coffee, arms, and other items badly needed by the South – off Grand Bahama Island on 4 January 1864. On 20 March, she overhauled the sloop Swallows – laden with cotton, rosin, and tobacco – and sent her to Boston. About the same time, she chased and overtook the sloop Oriental.

=== Crew stricken with yellow fever, ship is sent north and decommissioned ===
Late in the spring of 1864, yellow fever broke out on board Tioga; and, on 19 June, she was ordered north. She arrived at Portsmouth, New Hampshire, on the 27th and was decommissioned two days later but remained in quarantine in the lower harbor until October.

== Post-war operations ==
After an overhaul had been completed and the Civil War had ended, Tioga was recommissioned at Portsmouth on 6 June 1865 and cruised off the New England coast through the summer. In October, the ship was transferred to the Gulf Squadron; and she arrived at Pensacola, Florida, on 30 November. The double-ender cruised in the Gulf of Mexico, principally off the coast of Texas, through the winter and into the spring of 1866.

== Final decommissioning and sale ==
Ordered north, Tioga arrived at New York City on 8 May and was laid up in the navy yard there until she was sold on 15 October 1867.

== See also ==
- Confederate States Navy
