= CSS Missouri =

Confederate States Navy casemate ironclad paddle steamer

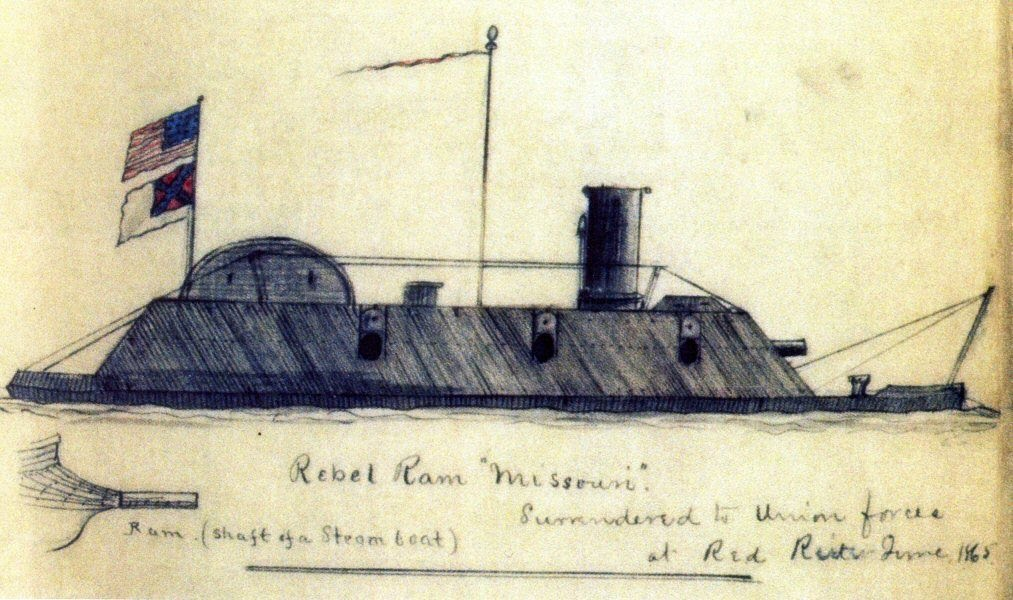
- Watercolor of Missouri

History

Confederate States
- Name: Missouri
- Namesake: Missouri
- Ordered: 1 November 1862
- Laid down: December 1862
- Launched: 14 April 1863
- Commissioned: 19 September 1863
- Fate: Surrendered, 3 June 1865; Sold for scrap, 29 November 1865

General characteristics
- Type: Casemate ironclad
- Length: 183 ft (55.8 m) (o/a)
- Beam: 53 ft 8 in (16.4 m)
- Draft: 8 ft 6 in (2.6 m)
- Installed power: 4 × return-flue boilers
- Propulsion: Stern paddle wheel; 2 × steam engines
- Speed: 10 mph (16 km/h)
- Armament: 1 × 11 in (281 mm) smoothbore Dahlgren gun; 1 × 9 in (229 mm) smoothbore Dahlgren gun; 1 × 32 pdr (14.5 kg) smoothbore siege gun
- Armor: Casemate: 4.5 in (114 mm); Deck: 4.5 in (114 mm)

CSS (Note: Confederate States Ship.) Missouri was a casemate ironclad built by the Confederate States Navy during the American Civil War. Her propulsion machinery was taken from an existing steamboat, her armor was railroad T-rails, and she was armed with three captured cannon. She was difficult to steer and leaked badly. Additional equipment had to be added to allow her to reach her intended speed. Completed during 1863 on the Red River, she was trapped in the Shreveport, Louisiana, area by low water and never saw combat. The vessel's crew had desertion issues and some of her crewmen were pulled from the army. After traveling downriver for the first time, the ship was surrendered in June 1865 to the United States Navy—the last Confederate ironclad to be handed over—and sold in November.

== Description ==
Missouri was 183 feet (55.8 m) long overall, had a beam of 53 feet 8 inches (16.4 m) and a draft of 8 feet 6 inches (2.6 m). Her casemate extended for most of the length of the ship and was 130 feet 6 inches (39.8 m) long. It partially enclosed her 22-foot-6-inch (6.9 m) diameter stern paddle wheel in a recess at the aft end of the casemate; the upper 8 feet 4 inches (2.5 m) of the paddle wheel protruded above the casemate and was totally unprotected.

The ship's propulsion machinery was taken from either the steamboats Grand Era or T. W. Roberts. It consisted of two single-cylinder, poppet valve steam engines with a bore of 24 inches (61 cm) and a 7-foot-6-inch (2.3 m) stroke. These used steam provided by four horizontal return-flue boilers that were 26 ft (7.9 m) long and 40 in (1 m) in diameter that were connected to a single funnel. Other machinery was taken from the supply vessel CSS Paul Jones. During her initial sea trials on 17 June 1863, she had a maximum speed of 6 miles per hour (9.7 km/h) going upstream only half the speed as had been promised. After the installation of a donkey engine to power a 3-foot (0.91 m) fan, the bilge pumps and a capstan a few months later, she reached a speed of 10 miles per hour (16 km/h) against a 2–3-mile-per-hour (3.2–4.8 km/h) current.

Missouri's armor consisted of 4.5-inch-thick (114 mm) railroad T-rails, laid alternately with the crowns up and down. They were spiked to the backing of 23 inches (580 mm) of yellow pine, but not closely together enough to give them a solid surface. On the sides of the ship, they were laid diagonally, but were vertical on the bow and stern faces of the casemate. The armor extended approximately 6 feet (1.8 m) below the waterline. The casemate was sloped at an angle of 30°. The deck fore and aft of the casemate was also protected by T-rails. At the forward end of the casemate was a pilothouse that was raised 19 inches (480 mm) above the deck. She was built of green timber, caulked with cotton and was riddled with leaks; the leaking was largely due to the use of the green timber. Despite her three rudders, her stern wheel made her difficult to steer.

The casemate had eight gun ports, two in the bow face and three on each side, although only three guns were mounted in the ship. A smoothbore 11-inch (279 mm) Dahlgren pivot gun was mounted in the starboard forward position. It could fire out of the starboard bow port or the forward starboard broadside port. It weighed approximately 16,000 pounds (7,300 kg) and could fire a 136-pound (61.7 kg) shell up to a range of 3,650 yards (3,340 m) at an elevation of 15°. An old 32-pounder (14.5 kg) siege gun was in the equivalent position on the port side of the ship. The characteristics of this gun cannot be reliably determined because the United States produced a multitude of 32-pounder guns before the Civil War, but none of them were designated as siege guns. The third gun was a smoothbore 9-inch (229 mm) Dahlgren pivot gun that could fire out of either of the two aft broadside gun ports. It weighed approximately 9,200 pounds (4,200 kg) and could fire a 72.5-pound (32.9 kg) shell up to a range of 3,357 yards (3,070 m) at an elevation of 15°. The two Dahlgren guns had been salvaged from the wreck of the Union ironclad USS Indianola and the 32-pounder piece was likely captured from the Gosport Navy Yard. No guns were provided for the two center broadside gun ports. Different cannons were originally slated to be assigned to Missouri, but those were intercepted by John C. Pemberton for use in the defenses of the Mississippi cities of Vicksburg and Grand Gulf.

== Construction and service ==
The Confederate Navy Department authorized the construction of one or more ironclad warships at Shreveport on 3 October 1862 and Lieutenant Jonathan H. Carter contracted for two ships on 1 November. One contract was placed with riverboat captains Thomas Moore and John Smoker for one ironclad, with the other being awarded to George Fitch; the Fitch ironclad project was postponed in favor of the other and was eventually canceled. No complete blueprint of the ship is known to survive, but it is believed that she was designed by Chief Naval Constructor John L. Porter. The contract with Moore and Smoker specified a cost of $336,500 to be paid in installments. The keel of the first ship was laid in December and she was launched on 14 April 1863. By June, she was complete enough for a trial run. The ship was turned over to the Confederate Navy on 12 September 1863 and commissioned a week later after the high-water season on the Red River had ended, although she did not receive her guns until between November 1863 and March 1864. Carter proposed to name the vessel Caddo after a Native American tribe, but it was instead decided to name her Missouri after the state and its erstwhile Confederate government. First Lieutenant Charles Fauntleroy was appointed as her captain, although he told Carter that "he hoped the damned boat would sink" and that he "never intended to serve on her if he could help it". He desired a command on an ocean-going vessel, rather than his assignment to the inland ironclad. Fauntleroy was transferred in July to command a blockade runner, and Carter, who had previously commanded the gunboat CSS General Polk and was in Shreveport on direct orders from Confederate States Secretary of the Navy Stephen R. Mallory, was placed in command. Much of Missouri's crew was transferred from CSS Harriet Lane, while others were taken from the army. In mid-December 1863, Carter requested 72 crewmen, a blacksmith, and a carpenter for Missouri. Crew conditions on the ironclad were unpleasant, and the ship's crew was plagued by desertions among the army men. Low water prevented Missouri from playing any part in the Red River Campaign of early 1864. Her movements were also hampered by a lack of fuel. In September, Carter commanded an unsuccessful attempt to seize the Federal gunboat USS Rattler using men from the crews of Missouri and CSS Webb.

In March 1865, the river began to rise and Missouri was able to leave the Shreveport area for the first time. She reached Alexandria, Louisiana, on 8 April and anchored where she could defend the town. In order to travel to Alexandria, fuel for the vessel had to be requisitioned from plantations along the way. Part of her crew was then transferred to Webb, which made an unsuccessful attempt to escape into the Gulf of Mexico on 23 April. Carter surrendered the ship to Union forces on 3 June, the last Confederate ironclad to surrender. After her armor was removed, Missouri was sold at public auction on 29 November at Mound City, Illinois to be scrapped.

== Bibliography ==
- Bisbee, Saxon T. (2018). Engines of Rebellion: Confederate Ironclads and Steam Engineering in the American Civil War. Tuscaloosa, Alabama: University of Alabama Press. ISBN 978-0-81731-986-1.
- Canney, Donald L. (2015). The Confederate Steam Navy 1861-1865. Atglen, Pennsylvania: Schiffer Publishing. ISBN 978-0-7643-4824-2.
- Chatelain, Neil P. (2020). Defending the Arteries of Rebellion: Confederate Naval Operations in the Mississippi River Valley, 1861–1865. El Dorado Hills, California: Savas Beatie. ISBN 978-1-61121-510-6.
- Jeter, Katherine Brash (1987). "Against All Odds: Lt. Jonathan H. Carter, CSN, and His Ironclad". Louisiana History. 28 (3): 263–288.
- Koehler, R. B. & Stehman, Dean (1987). "Question 17/86". Warship International. XXIV (2): 211–212. ISSN 0043-0374.
- Olmstead, Edwin; Stark, Wayne E. & Tucker, Spencer C. (1997). The Big Guns: Civil War Siege, Seacoast, and Naval Cannon. Alexandria Bay, New York: Museum Restoration Service. ISBN 0-88855-012-X.
- Silverstone, Paul H. (2006). Civil War Navies 1855-1883. The U.S. Navy Warship Series. New York: Routledge. ISBN 0-415-97870-X.
- Still, William N. Jr. (1985) [1971]. Iron Afloat: The Story of the Confederate Armorclads. Columbia, South Carolina: University of South Carolina Press. ISBN 0-87249-454-3.
- United States, Naval War Records Office (1917). Official Records of the Union and Confederate Navies in the War of the Rebellion. Series I. Vol. 27: Naval Forces on Western Waters (January 1, 1865 - September 6, 1865), Supply Vessels (January 1, 1865 - September 6, 1865). Washington, D. C.: Government Printing Office.
