= USS New London =

Gunboat of the United States Navy

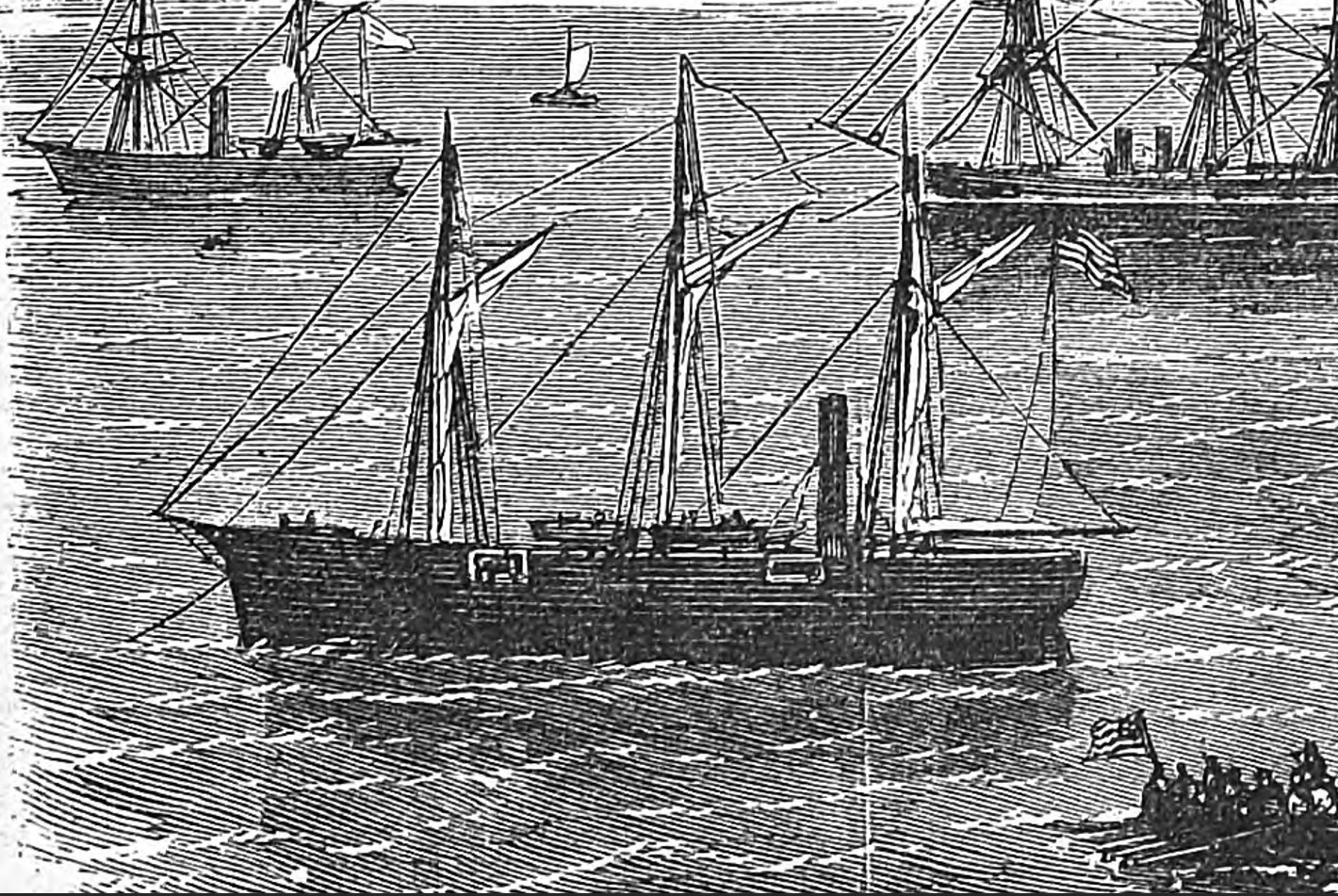
- USS New London off Ship Island, Mississippi, ca. January 1862

History

United States
- Name: New London (1859); USS New London (1861); Acushnet (1865)
- Owner: New London Propeller Company (1859–61); United States Navy (1861–65); Kelly & O. (1865?–69?); New Bedford & New York SSC (1869?–81?); Thomas M. Hart (1881?–??)
- Builder: George Greenman & Co. (Mystic, CT)
- Launched: 1859
- Acquired: (by USN): 26 Aug 1861
- Commissioned: 29 Oct 1861 – 3 Aug 1865
- In service: 1859–1909 or later
- Fate: Slated for conversion to lumber barge, 1909; subsequent fate unknown

General characteristics
- Displacement: 221 tons
- Length: 125 ft (38 m)
- Beam: 25 ft (7.6 m)
- Draft: 9 ft 6 in (2.90 m)
- Depth of hold: 7 ft 8 in (2.34 m)
- Installed power: Vertical direct-acting; 34-inch bore by 30-inch stroke
- Propulsion: Single screw
- Sail plan: 3 masts, schooner-rigged
- Speed: 9.5 knots (17.6 km/h; 10.9 mph)
- Complement: 47 officers and enlisted
- Armament: one 20-pounder Parrott rifle; four 32-pounder guns

USS New London was a screw steamer of the Union Navy during the American Civil War. Originally built in 1859 for commercial service between New York and Connecticut, the vessel was acquired by the Navy in 1861 and converted into a gunboat, serving throughout the war on blockade duty in the Gulf of Mexico.

After the war, the ship was decommissioned and sold, re-entering commercial service under the name Acushnet. She continued in merchant service until 1910.

== Construction and design ==
New London, a wooden-hulled screw steamer, was built in Mystic, Connecticut, in 1859 by George Greenman & Company for the New London Propeller Company, which intended to put the vessel in commercial service between New York City and New London, Connecticut.

The ship was built of white oak and chestnut with copper and iron fastenings. She was 125 feet (38 m) in length, with a beam of 25 feet 6 inches (7.77 m) and draft of 9 feet 6 inches (2.90 m). She had a single deck, and a hold depth of 7 feet 8 inches (2.34 m). A poop-cabin was fitted aft on the spar deck and a freight house forward. Her gross register tonnage was 260 tons and her displacement 221 tons.

New London was powered by a single-cylinder vertical direct-acting steam engine with a bore of 34 inches (86 cm) and stroke of 30 inches (76 cm), driving a four-bladed single screw propeller with a diameter of 9 feet (2.7 m) and pitch of 17 feet (5.2 m). The engine was built by C. H. Delamater of New York. Steam was supplied by a single return-tubular boiler with a length of 18 feet (5.5 m) and diameter of 8 feet 8 inches (2.64 m), located on deck. The boiler was fitted with a blower engine. An independent steam, fire, and bilge pump was also installed on the vessel. For auxiliary power, New London was fitted with three masts, schooner-rigged. The ship's speed in commercial service is not recorded but in later naval service it was given as 9.6 knots (17.8 km/h; 11.0 mph).

== Service history ==
New London was purchased by the Navy at New York City on 26 August 1861. After conversion to a gunboat, which included the installation of a single 20-pounder Parrott rifle and four 32-pounder guns, she was commissioned at New York Navy Yard on 29 October 1861, with Lieutenant Abner Read in command. Ordered to the Gulf of Mexico on 2 November, New London, aided by USS R. R. Cuyler, captured the schooner Olive laden with lumber shortly before midnight on 21 November. Early the next morning, she took the steamboat Anna carrying turpentine and rosin from Pascagoula, Mississippi, to New Orleans, Louisiana. About dawn a week later, she took the steamboat Henry Lewis carrying sugar and molasses; and that afternoon she captured a schooner trying to slip through the blockade with naval stores for Havana, Cuba. On 28 November 1861 she captured the schooner A. J. View, which was later put into service in the U.S. Navy. New London captured the steamer Advocate on 1 December; and the schooner Delight with sloops Empress and Osceola on 9 December. On the 28th the schooner Gypsy became her prize.

Not content just to capture ships, New London, with USS Water Witch and USS Henry Lewis, rounded out her record on the last day of 1861 by sending a landing party ashore to capture Biloxi, Mississippi, destroying a Confederate battery and taking possession of two guns and the schooner Captain Spedden. On 20 February 1862 a boat expedition from New London landed on Cat Island, Mississippi and interned 12 small sloops and schooners suspected of being pilot boats for blockade runners. On 4 April, with USS John P. Jackson and USS Hatteras, New London engaged CSS Carondelet, CSS Pamlico, and CSS Oregon while Henry Lewis landed 1,200 Union Army troops at Pass Christian, Mississippi and destroyed a Confederate camp there. Boats from New London captured the yachts Comet and Algerine near New Basin Canal, Louisiana on 2 June. On 17 June she captured and destroyed batteries at North and South passes.

According to a contemporaneous article in the Charleston Daily Courier, on July 18 New London, accompanied by Grey Cloud, approached the large hotel at Pascagoula and announced her arrival by firing two shells over the hotel. Both steamers had been reinforced by men from USS Potomac for this raid. New London docked at the Hotel Wharf at Pascagoula, Mississippi, and deployed about 60 sailors and marines to the village to capture mails and confiscate the telegraph equipment. Sentries quickly spotted a Confederate cavalry patrol and the sailors and marines withdrew to their gunboats. Grey Cloud moved about a half-mile west and attempted to enter the Pascagoula River with the intent on capturing local schooners with turpentine and lumber. However, the mouth of the river was obstructed to prevent passage. At this point the gunboats stood off shore and put in three launches loaded with about 25 sailors and marines each and proceeded up the river. About a mile from the mouth, where the river is less than 200 yards wide, the launches were ambushed by a platoon of 30 troopers of the Mobile Dragoons, a cavalry unit armed with Sharps carbines. The launches returned fire, but were in the open and withdrew to the mouth of the river with eight or nine wounded. Once the launches were clear, New London fired 25 shells into the village and Grey Cloud fired seven; however, only one civilian was reported slightly wounded. After sitting offshore 19 July, the ships withdrew from the shoreline.

During the ensuing years New London served on blockade duty in the Gulf of Mexico, operating primarily off the Texas coast. She and USS Cayuga captured the British schooner Tampico off Sabine Pass, Texas, attempting to run out laden with cotton on 3 April 1863. On the 10th, while reconnoitering near Sabine City, a boat crew from New London captured a small sloop. Among the prisoners was Capt. Charles Fowler, CSN, who had commanded CSS Josiah A. Bell when the Confederate warship took USS Morning Light and USS Velocity in January. On 18 April, another boat expedition was surprised and driven off by Confederate troops. On 7 July, with USS Monongahela, New London engaged batteries below Donaldsonville, Louisiana. Three days later, while steaming to New Orleans, the ship engaged Confederate batteries at White Hall Point, Mississippi. Back off the Texas coast, she captured the schooner Raton del Nilo on 3 December.

New London continued to serve the West Gulf Blockading Squadron through the end of the Civil War. She sailed north on 12 July 1865 and decommissioned at Boston, Massachusetts, 3 August 1865. She was sold at public auction on 8 September 1865 to M. M. Comstock. Redocumented as Acushnet on 27 December 1865, she operated in merchant service until 1910.
