= CSS Oregon =

Sidewheel steamer

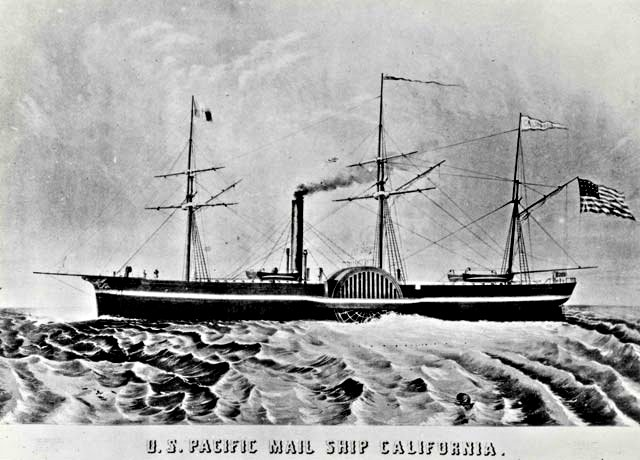
- CSS Oregon is described as similar to the wooden steamship SS California seen above, although with only one mast

History

Confederate States
- Name: Oregon
- Laid down: 1846
- Acquired: 1861
- Fate: Scuttled in April 1862

General characteristics
- Displacement: 532 tons
- Length: 216 ft 10 in (66 m)
- Beam: 26 ft 6 in (8.1 m)
- Draft: 9 ft 6 in (2.9 m)
- Propulsion: Steam engines
- Armament: 1 × 8 in (203 mm) gun, 1 × 32 pounder (15 kg), two howitzers

CSS Oregon was a wooden sidewheel steamer that served as a gunboat in the Confederate States Army during the American Civil War. Built in 1846 for the Mobile Mail Line, she transported mail between New Orleans, Louisiana, and Mobile, Alabama, before the war. In 1861, she was seized by the Governor of Louisiana, Thomas Overton Moore, and served as a blockade runner before being selected for use by the Confederate Army. After transferring men and supplies to Ship Island, she was formally converted into a gunboat and armed with four cannon. Remaining behind on Lake Pontchartrain when many Confederate warships were transferred up the Mississippi River, Oregon served in the Mississippi Sound and Pass Christian areas. She took part in several minor actions involving USS New London, two of which resulted in the Confederates moving into shallow water to avoid close-range action, and the third ending when the Confederate ships abandoned the Pass Christian area. In April 1862, Union pressure confined her and other Confederate ships to Lake Pontchartrain. Later that month, with Union forces closing in on New Orleans, Oregon was sunk as a blockship. Her wreck was removed and destroyed in the early 1870s.

== Construction and pre-war career ==
Oregon was built at New York City in 1846. A sidewheel steamer, she also had a single mast. With a hull that was made from wood, she had one deck and a billethead. She was 216 feet 10 inches (66 m) long, had a beam of 26 feet 6 inches (8.1 m), weighed 532 tons, and had a draft of 9 feet 6 inches (2.9 m). Oregon is reported by the Dictionary of American Naval Fighting Ships to have resembled the steamer California. Built for the Mobile Mail Line, Oregon was used to transport mail between Mobile, Alabama, and New Orleans, Louisiana. As of April 1861, the Geddes family of New Orleans and Cincinnati had a 60 percent ownership stake in the vessel, with the remainder being in the hands of two Mobile residents: R. A. Heirn and Samuel Wolff. Heirn had been listed as the ship's master in 1854.

== American Civil War ==
After the outbreak of the American Civil War in April 1861, Governor of Louisiana Thomas Overton Moore had the ship seized. While the United States Navy had a number of vessels at the beginning of the war, the Confederates had to build a navy from nothing with limited infrastructure and manufacturing. At a decided disadvantage in the naval sphere, the Confederates relied heavily on blockade running and to a lesser degree privateering. Oregon repeatedly ran the Union blockade, and under the command of Captain A. P. Boardman made 92 "entrance and clearances" to ports through the blockade. Both the Confederate States Army and the Confederate States Navy were selecting vessels for military service, and Oregon and the steamer J. D. Swain were chosen by the Confederate Army that summer. Oregon was armed with an 8-inch (20cm) columbiad and a 12-pounder (5 kg) howitzer, while J. D. Swain was armed with a 32-pounder (15 kg) rifled cannon and another howitzer.

In July, the two ships participated in a joint Army-Navy expedition. Launches from the Union blockading force were harassing the Confederate coastline, and the Confederates formed an expedition to counter the threat. About 135 sailors and marines were loaded onto Oregon and J. D. Swain, and the two ships left Lake Pontchartrain on July 5 and headed to Bay St. Louis, Mississippi. After spending the next day unsuccessfully looking for Union vessels, the vessels landed at Ship Island, which was located in a strategic place off of the Confederate coastline. The sailors and marines began constructing a small fortification, while Oregon inspected two fishing boats in the area before releasing them. The four cannons on the Confederate ships were taken ashore to defend the island. Oregon and J. D. Swain returned to New Orleans on July 7, and the former returned with the steamer CSS Gray Cloud the next day to bring further men and supplies for the fort. On July 13, Oregon and the steamer CSS Arrow attempted to lure the gunboat USS Massachusetts into the range of the Confederate cannon on Ship Island, but the Union vessel remained at a distance.

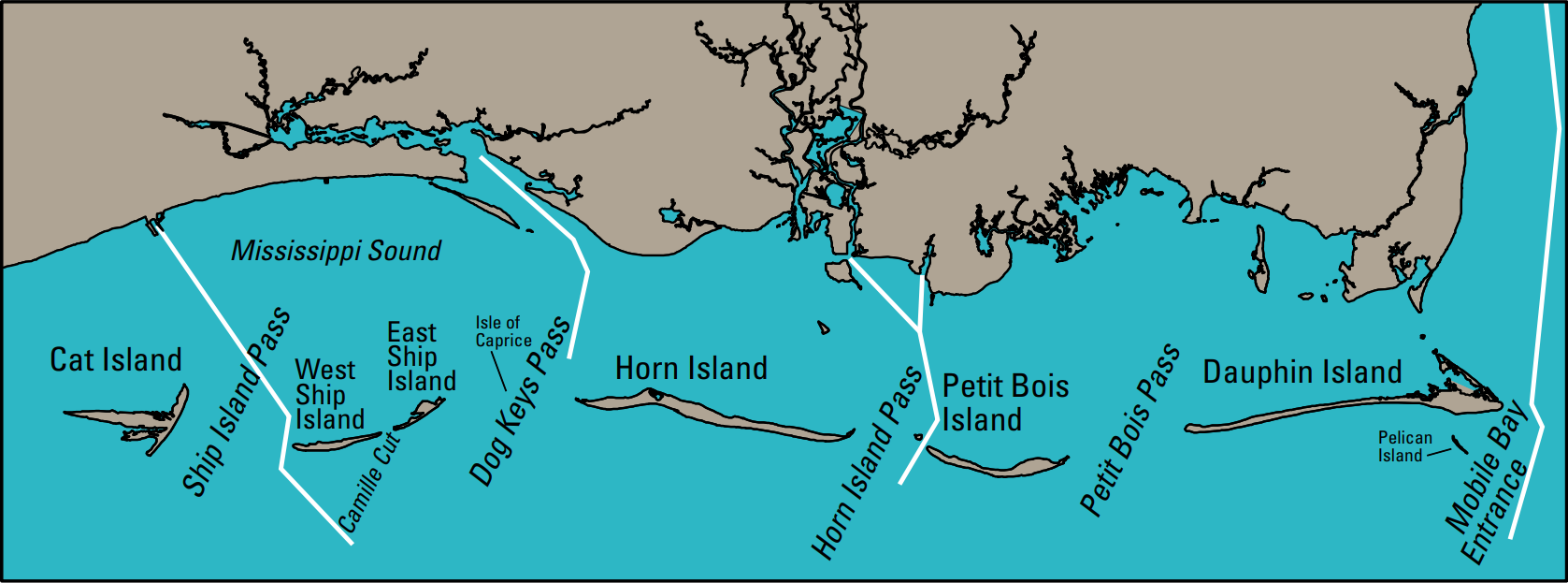
Map of Mississippi Sound, showing the locations of Horn Island and Ship Island

Oregon was one of two ships that was used to run supplies to the position on Ship Island. The Confederate Army eventually fitted her as a gunboat and placed her under the command of Captain Abraham L. Myers. She was armed with one 8-inch (203 mm) cannon, one 32-pounder (15 kg) gun, and two small howitzers. Worried that the garrison at Ship Island could be easily cut off by the Union Navy and starved into submission, Confederate Major General David Twiggs ordered the island abandoned on September 13. Oregon helped evacuate supplies from the island, and the withdrawal was completed on September 16. In late 1861 and early 1862, much of the Confederate fleet in New Orleans was transferred up the Mississippi River to support the Confederate defenses of Columbus, Kentucky, but Oregon remained behind, serving on Lake Pontchartrain and intended to help other ships defend the coasts of Louisiana and Mississippi. On December 7, 1861, the gunboat CSS Pamlico sighted Union vessels entering Mississippi Sound. Oregon was present at Mississippi City, Mississippi, to transport equipment for a powder mill from there to New Orleans, and joined Pamlico in confronting the Union ships, which turned out to be the steamers USS New London and USS De Soto. Remaining in shallow water that the Union vessels could not enter, the Confederates fired on them with two rifled cannon. Oregon and Pamlico ignored a challenge from New London for a closer quarters fight, and the Union ships withdrew.

Pamlico then escorted Oregon back to New Orleans, where the latter unloaded the power mill equipment, which increased the city's capacity for gunpowder production. After meeting a blockade runner in Lake Borgne, Pamlico and Oregon attempted to escort her into the Gulf of Mexico on December 20, but were detected by Union forces near Ship Island and forced to withdraw back to Lake Borgne. On March 25, 1862, Oregon was escorted by Pamlico to the Pass Christian area to deliver supplies and then on her own moved towards Ship Island to scout Union positions. Withdrawing to Pass Christian after being sighted, she was pursued by New London. Oregon and Pamlico moved to engage the Union ship, and began firing from a range of 2,000 yards (1,800 m). Two of Pamlico's cannons were unable to be fired safely due to defective ammunition, and after Pamlico's third cannon was rendered unusable after a projectile became stuck in the barrel, the two ships withdrew into shallow water, where New London could not pursue. The Union ship fell back several hours later.

On April 3, New London, the steamer USS John P. Jackson, and the troop transport USS Henry Lewis left Biloxi, Mississippi, to move against Pass Christian. Pamlico, Oregon, and the gunboat CSS Carondelet were mobilized to counter the threat. In an action offshore of Pass Christian, Confederate fire forced Henry Lewis to withdraw, and the other Union vessels suffered light damage. Oregon suffered a hit to her ship's wheel, and her pilot was wounded when a projectile entered the pilothouse. With Carondelet's wheel also damaged in the battle and the steamer USS Hatteras approaching, the Confederate vessels withdrew to Lake Pontchartrain and the Union forces moved on to Pass Christian. The 1,200 troops aboard Henry Lewis landed, and the area was captured. With Union forces preparing to attack New Orleans, Oregon, Pamlico, Carondelet, Arrow, and the gunboat CSS Bienville remained at Lake Pontchartrian, guarding Chef Menteur Pass and the Rigolets.

On April 24, Union Navy forces under Flag Officer David Glasgow Farragut pushed passed the Confederate defenses at Fort Jackson and Fort St. Philip, and then moved past the defenses at Chalmette, Louisiana, the next day. New Orleans was largely indefensible after the fall of those positions, and Oregon was sunk as a blockship. Naval historian Neil P. Chatelain states that she was sunk in the Rigolets between Lake Pontchartrain and Lake Borgne, while historian W. Craig Gaines places the sinking in either the Tchefuncte River or the Bogue Falaya River. The wreck later interfered with the escape of other Confederate vessels from Lake Pontchartrain, and remained there until a contractor for the United States Army Corps of Engineers removed it between 1872 and 1873. Any iron debris was removed by the contractor, while the rest of the wreck was burned on shore.

== Sources ==
- Bova, Gregory D. (1997). "Ship Island: The Unwanted Key to the Confederacy". Civil War Regiments. 5 (4). Savas Publishing: 61–79.
- Chatelain, Neil P. (2018). "The Confederacy's Lake Pontchartrain Naval Squadron: A Cooperative Defense of the Coastal Approaches to New Orleans, 1861-1862". Louisiana History. 59 (2): 167–195. JSTOR 26475479.
- Chatelain, Neil P. (2020). Defending the Arteries of Rebellion: Confederate Naval Operations in the Mississippi River Valley, 1861–1865. El Dorado Hills, California: Savas Beatie. ISBN 978-1-61121-510-6.
- Gaines, W. Craig (2008). Encyclopedia of Civil War Shipwrecks. Baton Rouge, Louisiana: Louisiana State University Press. ISBN 978-0-8071-3274-6.
- Silverstone, Paul H. (1989). Warships of the Civil War Navies. Annapolis, Maryland: Naval Institute Press. ISBN 0-87021-783-6.
- Smith, Steven D. (2003) [2000]. "The Submarine H. L. Hunley: Confederate Innovation and Southern Icon". In Geier, Clarence R.; Potter, Stephen R. (eds.). Archaeological Perspectives on the American Civil War. University Press of Florida. ISBN 0-8130-2651-2.
