= CSS Pamlico =

Steamer in the Confederate States Navy

History

Confederate States
- Name: Pamlico
- Owner: Confederate States Navy
- Completed: 1856
- Acquired: July 10, 1861
- Commissioned: September 2, 1861
- Fate: Burned by crew, April 25, 1862

General characteristics
- Type: Sidewheel steamer
- Displacement: 218 long tons (221 t)
- Armament: 3×8-inch (20 cm) smoothbore cannons; 1×6.4-inch (16 cm) Brooke rifle

CSS Pamlico was a sidewheel steamer that served in the Confederate States Navy during the early stages of the American Civil War. Originally a passenger vessel on Lake Pontchartrain, she was purchased by Confederate authorities on July 10, 1861, and converted into a gunboat. She participated in two minor naval actions in the vicinities of Horn Island and Ship Island in December, before taking part in two more small battles defending the Pass Christian area in March and April 1862. In late April, Union Navy ships passed the defenses of New Orleans, Louisiana. After ferrying Confederate troops out of the city, Pamlico was burned by her crew on Lake Pontchartrain on April 25 to prevent capture.

== Service history ==
=== Civilian service and conversion ===
A sidewheel steamer, Pamlico was built in 1856 in New York City, and was based out of the New Orleans, Louisiana area. In early July 1861, she was advertised as making passenger trips between the Louisiana towns of Mandeville, Lewisburg, Madisonville, and Covington and the Lake Pontchartrain railhead of the Pontchartrain Railroad. At the outset of the American Civil War in 1861, the breakaway Confederate States of America was at a significant naval disadvantage to the United States of America. While the United States had a functioning navy, the Confederates had to essentially build one from scratch with limited infrastructure and manufacturing abilities. The Confederates began inspecting vessels to determine if they were suitable for acquisition and conversion into gunboats, and Pamlico was purchased on July 10, 1861 for that purpose. Along with Pamlico, the Lake Pontchartrain passenger vessels Arrow and A. G. Brown were seized as well, leading residents of areas on the lakeshore to complain that the Confederate government had taken their means of transportation and communication. A small vessel, Pamlico displaced 218 long tons (221 t). Her other dimensions are unknown. She was commissioned on September 2, and placed under the command of First Lieutenant William G. Dozier. On November 21, 1861, and February 27, 1862, she was reported to be armed with two cannons, but she was also reported to have been armed with three 8-inch (20 cm) smoothbore cannons and a 6.4-inch (16 cm) Brooke rifle; according to naval historian W. Craig Gaines this could represent the addition of two extra cannons rather than an inconsistency between sources.

=== Military use ===
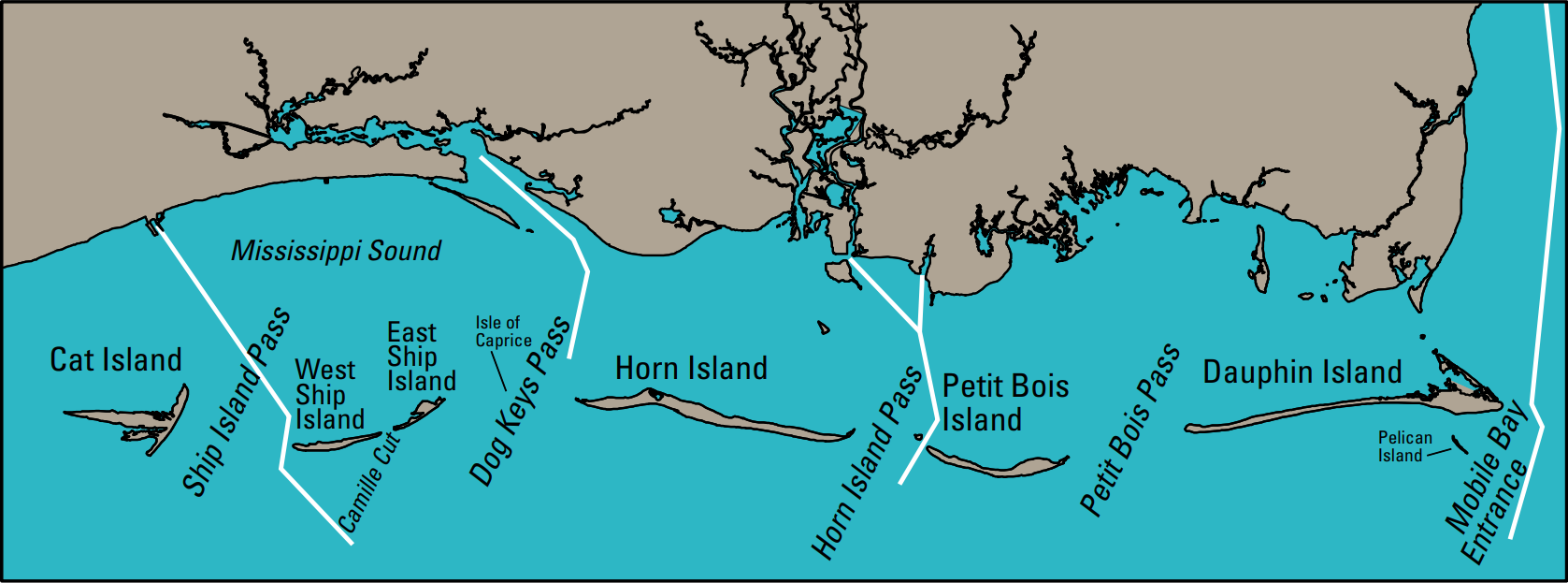
Map of Mississippi Sound, showing the locations of Horn Island and Ship Island

Pamlico entered active service immediately after her commissioning, patrolling Mississippi Sound as far east as Horn Island. Together with the gunboat CSS Florida, Pamlico was involved in an attempt to board the steamer USS Montgomery, which was part of the Union blockade, on December 4. The plan was to disable Montgomery with long-range fire from the single rifled cannon each ship carried and then board her; Pamlico carried around 400 soldiers for the boarding. The commander of the Union vessel correctly guessed the Confederate intentions, and Montgomery escaped into the open ocean. Three days later, on a trip westwards from Horn Island, Pamlico spotted the blockading gunboats USS New London and USS De Soto near Mississippi City, Mississippi. The gunboat CSS Oregon, which was transporting powder mill equipment, was at Mississippi City, and together the two ships, under the overall command of Dozier, confronted the Union vessels. The Confederates fired at longer range with their two rifled guns while remaining in shallow waters that the blockading ships could not enter; New London and De Soto later withdrew after the Confederates ignored a challenge for closer combat. The Dictionary of American Naval Fighting Ships describes Pamlico's involvement in the two December clashes as ineffectual. After the December 7 engagement, Pamlico escorted Oregon to Lake Borgne; on December 20, both gunboats were part of an attempt to escort a blockade runner past the Union blockade that failed when they encountered Union blockaders near Ship Island.

On March 25, 1862, Pamlico provided an escort for Oregon to the Pass Christian area. After dropping off supplies, Oregon continued east to scout in the Ship Island area, and encountered New London. Oregon returned to Pamlico, and the two ships advanced towards New London. The two sides fired at each other from a range of 2,000 yards (1,800 m). A round fired from one of Pamlico's 8-inch guns exploded prematurely, leading Dozier to no longer trust the ammunition he had for those guns. After a jammed shot disabled the Brooke rifle on Pamlico, the Confederate ships withdrew, with Pamlico heading to Fort Macomb for repairs to her gun deck and pilothouse. The fighting had lasted about two hours. On April 3, three Union vessels – New London, the steamer USS John P. Jackson, and the troop transport USS Henry Lewis – made an offensive against Pass Christian. Pamlico, Oregon, and the gunboat CSS Carondelet responded. Henry Lewis was temporarily forced to withdraw when she was hit by a Confederate shell, but after an hour of fighting, the Confederates withdrew; Oregon and Carondelet had suffered minor damage. After the Confederate withdrawal, the Union troops on Henry Lewis were able to land and take control of Pass Christian, including destroying a Confederate camp in the area. The three Confederate vessels took up positions on Lake Pontchartrain, where they guarded Chef Menteur Pass and the Rigolets. Some of Pamlico's sailors were taken on April 21 to help crew the ironclad CSS Louisiana.

On April 24, Union ships passed the Confederate defenses at Fort Jackson and Fort St. Philip. They then passed further defenses at Chalmette the next day, rendering New Orleans essentially indefensible. Oregon was sunk as a blockship, but the wreck later prevented Pamlico, Arrow, Carondelet, and the gunboat CSS Bienville from escaping. The four Confederate vessels ferried Confederate troops from New Orleans across Lake Pontchartrain to Covington. Their cannons were removed and were sent to the defenses at Vicksburg, Mississippi. Pamlico was burned by her crew on Lake Pontchartrain to prevent capture, on April 25.

== Sources ==
- Chatelain, Neil P. (2018). "The Confederacy's Lake Pontchartrain Naval Squadron: A Cooperative Defense of the Coastal Approaches to New Orleans, 1861-1862". Louisiana History. 59 (2): 167–195. JSTOR 26475479.
- Chatelain, Neil P. (2020). Defending the Arteries of Rebellion: Confederate Naval Operations in the Mississippi River Valley, 1861–1865. El Dorado Hills, California: Savas Beatie. ISBN 978-1-61121-510-6.
- Civil War Naval Chronology, 1861–1865. Washington, D.C.: Naval History Division. 1961.
- Gaines, W. Craig (2008). Encyclopedia of Civil War Shipwrecks. Baton Rouge, Louisiana: Louisiana State University Press. ISBN 978-0-8071-3274-6.
- Official Records of the Union and Confederate Navies in the War of the Rebellion, Series 2. U. S. Naval War Records Office. Office memoranda. Vol. 1. Washington, D.C.: Government Printing Office. 1921. ISBN 978-0-918678-30-0.
- Silverstone, Paul H. (1989). Warships of the Civil War Navies. Annapolis, Maryland: Naval Institute Press. ISBN 0-87021-783-6.
- Smith, Steven D. (2003) [2000]. "The Submarine H. L. Hunley: Confederate Innovation and Southern Icon". In Geier, Clarence R.; Potter, Stephen R. (eds.). Archaeological Perspectives on the American Civil War. University Press of Florida. ISBN 0-8130-2651-2.
