= CSS Carondelet =

Sidewheel steamer

History

Confederate States
- Name: Carondelet
- Owner: Confederate States Navy
- Builder: John Hughes and S. D. Porter
- Laid down: 1861
- Launched: January 25, 1862
- Commissioned: March 16, 1862
- Fate: Scuttled, April 1862

General characteristics
- Type: Sidewheel steamer
- Tonnage: 700 tons
- Length: 196 feet (60 m)
- Beam: 38 feet (12 m)
- Armament: 5x 42-pounders; 1x 32-pounder rifled cannon; 1x other rifle gun

CSS Carondelet was a sidewheel steamer that served in the Confederate States Navy during the American Civil War. Construction for the vessel started in 1861, and she was launched on January 25, 1862, and commissioned on March 16. Her sister ship was CSS Bienville. On April 4, Carondelet, along with CSS Oregon and CSS Pamlico, took part in a small naval action near Pass Christian against USS New London, USS John P. Jackson, and the troop transport Henry Lewis. Carondelet suffered damage to her wheel during the fight, and likely fired the only two shots that struck John P. Jackson. Later that month, with the Confederates abandoning New Orleans, Louisiana, Carondelet was scuttled by her crew in either Lake Pontchartrain, the Tchefuncte River, or the Bogue Falaya River.

== Service history ==
In late 1861, during the American Civil War, Confederate authorities were establishing a naval force to defend New Orleans, Louisiana. Many vessels had been sent north up the Mississippi River to help defend Columbus, Kentucky, but a smaller fleet remained in the New Orleans area. To strengthen the New Orleans fleet, two sister ships were constructed on Bayou St. John: Carondelet and the steamer CSS Bienville; the two New Orleans vessels were possibly of the same design which was used to build the gunboats CSS Morgan and CSS Gaines at Mobile, Alabama. Carondelet was built by Confederate naval constructor Sydney Porter of the Confederate States Navy, while Beinville was built by John Hughes and Company under the supervision of Porter. the work on Carondelet began on September 16, and her engines had been ordered as soon as September 19. Her construction required over 97,000 feet (30,000 m) of wood planking. A sidewheel steamer, she was launched on January 25, 1862 and commissioned on March 16. She had a tonnage of 700 tons, with a length of 196 feet (60 m) and a beam of 38 feet (12 m) excluding the boxes for the paddle wheels, with a small draft. Naval historian Paul Silverstone states that she was armed with five 42-pounder cannon, while historian W. Craig Gaines and the Dictionary of American Naval Fighting Ships state that she was also armed with a 32-pounder rifled cannon. The naval historian Donald L. Canney lists the 32-pounder rifle, the five 42-pounders, and a "smaller rifled gun".

Lake Pontchartrain, where Carondelet spent much of her existence. New Orleans is the city below the lake.

After her commissioning, Carondelet was placed under the command of First Lieutenant Washington Gwathmey. As sailors were in short supply, the ship's crew was supplemented by 30 Confederate States Army soldiers from the garrison of Fort Pike. The 42-pounder guns had also come from Army stockpiles. On April 3, two Union Navy ships – the steamers USS New London and USS John P. Jackson – and the troop transport Henry Lewis left Biloxi, Mississippi, to move against Confederate positions at Pass Christian. Along with the gunboats CSS Oregon and CSS Pamlico, Carondelet moved to combat the Union vessels on April 4. Henry Lewis withdrew after a Confederate shot struck her deck, wounding three men, and two shots probably fired by Carondelet caused minor damage to John P. Jackson. However, after both Oregon and Carondelet were hit in their wheels and the steamer USS Hatteras arrived to reinforce the Union ships, the Confederate vessels withdrew to Lake Pontchartrain, guarding the Chef Menteur Pass and the Rigolets. The 1,200 troops aboard Henry Lewis were then unloaded onto shore, and the Union forces captured the Pass Christian area and destroyed a local Confederate camp.

On April 24, Union Navy ships passed the Confederate positions of Fort Jackson and Fort St. Philip and passed the weaker defenses at Chalmette the next day. New Orleans was now essentially indefensible. Oregon was sunk as a blockship, but the location of the wreck later interfered with attempts by Carondelet, Bienville, Pamlico, and the transport CSS Arrow to escape. After ferrying Confederate troops out of the city to Covington across Lake Pontchartrain, Carondelet, Bienville, and Pamlico were scuttled by their crews on April 25. Their cannons were sent to Vicksburg, Mississippi, via the Confederate training facility Camp Moore. Naval historian Neil P. Chatelain, Silverstone, and the Dictionary of American Naval Fighting Ships both state that Carondelet was sunk in Lake Pontchartrain, with Chatelain specifying the northern part of the lake. Gaines states that she was sunk in either the Tchefuncte River or the Bogue Falaya River a mile from Covington. The wreck later became covered with sand and was a hazard to navigation. According to Gaines, it was likely removed in 1871 by the United States Army Corps of Engineers.

== Sources ==
- Canney, Donald L. (2015). The Confederate Steam Navy 1861–1865. Atglen, Pennsylvania: Schiffer. ISBN 978-0-7643-4824-2.
- Chatelain, Neil P. (2018). "The Confederacy's Lake Pontchartrain Naval Squadron: A Cooperative Defense of the Coastal Approaches to New Orleans, 1861-1862". Louisiana History. 59 (2): 167–195. JSTOR 26475479.
- Chatelain, Neil P. (2020). Defending the Arteries of Rebellion: Confederate Naval Operations in the Mississippi River Valley, 1861–1865. El Dorado Hills, California: Savas Beatie. ISBN 978-1-61121-510-6.
- Gaines, W. Craig (2008). Encyclopedia of Civil War Shipwrecks. Baton Rouge, Louisiana: Louisiana State University Press. ISBN 978-0-8071-3274-6.
- Silverstone, Paul H. (1989). Warships of the Civil War Navies. Annapolis, Maryland: Naval Institute Press. ISBN 0-87021-783-6.
