= USS Kensington (1862) =

Gunboat of the United States Navy

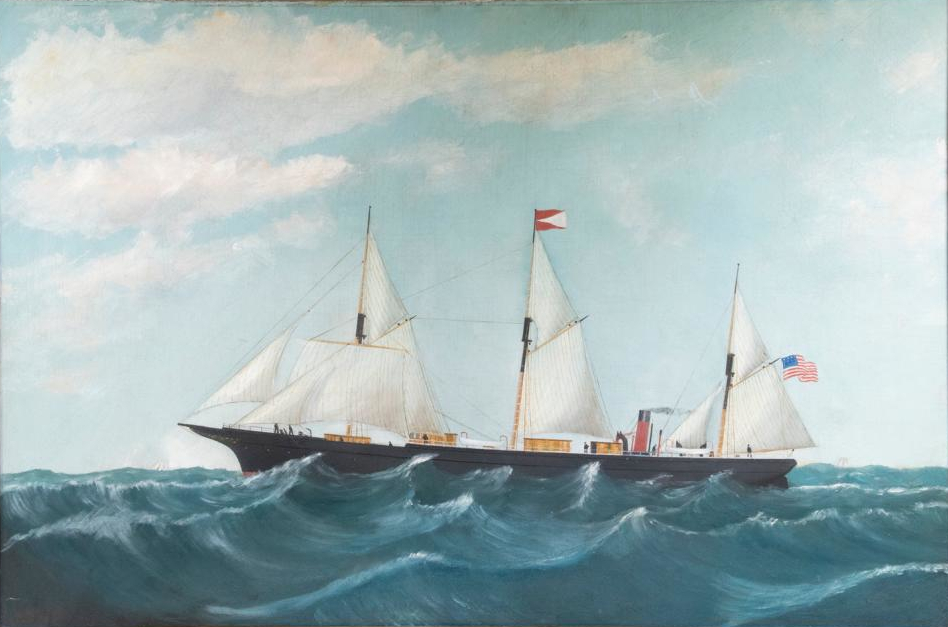
- Kensington in civil service, by William Pierce Stubbs

History

United States
- Name: USS Kensington
- Builder: J. W. Lynn, Philadelphia, Pennsylvania
- Launched: 1858
- Acquired: by purchase, 27 January 1862
- Commissioned: 15 February 1862
- Decommissioned: 5 May 1865
- Fate: Sold at auction, 12 July 1865; Sank after a collision, 27 January 1871

General characteristics
- Type: Steamship
- Displacement: 1,053 long tons (1,070 t)
- Length: 195 ft (59 m)
- Beam: 31 ft 10 in (9.70 m)
- Draft: 18 ft (5.5 m)
- Propulsion: Steam engine
- Speed: 10 knots (19 km/h; 12 mph)
- Complement: 72 officers and enlisted
- Armament: 2 × 32-pounder guns; 1 × 30-pounder Parrott rifle

The second USS Kensington was a steamship in the United States Navy.

Kensington was built at Philadelphia, Pennsylvania, by J. W. Lynn in 1858 and was purchased by the Union Navy at Boston, Massachusetts, 27 January 1862. She commissioned at Boston Navy Yard on 15 February.

== Service history ==
=== Blockading operations ===
The wooden steamer departed Boston on 24 February 1862 for the Gulf of Mexico, but heavy winds, rough seas, and engine trouble required her to stop at Charleston, South Carolina, for repairs. While, at Charleston she was of great service to ships of the North Atlantic Squadron furnishing them with fresh water. The supply and water vessel resumed her voyage in April and joined the West Gulf Blockading Squadron at New Orleans, Louisiana, 4 May.

=== Ordered to the Mississippi ===
After bringing water and supplies to Flag Officer David Farragut's ships blockading the Gulf Coast, Kensington was ordered to ascend the Mississippi River towing Horace Beals and Sarah Bruen, both of Commodore David D. Porter's Mortar Flotilla. While passing Ellis Cliffs, the three ships came under fire of Confederate batteries. Their answering salvos silenced the Southern guns enabling the Union force to continue passage to Vicksburg. After placing her charges in position to bombard the cliff side batteries which defended Vicksburg, Kensington remained with Porter's flotilla issuing water and supplies and from time to time assisting sailing ships to change positions.

After dropping down the river in mid-July, the water and supply ship visited blockaders stationed along the Louisiana and Texas coast. She joined Rachel Seaman and Henry Janes in bombarding a Confederate fort at Sabine Pass, Texas, on 25 September. The action was broken off when defending troops spiked their guns and evacuated the fort. Though Sabine Pass surrendered the next day, a shortage of troops prevented the Union Navy from occupying the area. Nevertheless, this operation and similar attacks were a constant drain on Southern strength, and compelled the Confederacy to disperse its forces widely.

== Capturing Confederate Vessels ==
During operations along western Gulf coast in September and October, Kensington captured British blockade running schooners Velocity. Adventure, Dart, and West Florida. She also took Confederate schooners Conchita, Dart, and Mary Ann; sloop Eliza; and steamer Dan.

Kensington began her voyage to Pensacola, Florida, with her prizes 13 October, delivering water en route to blockading ships stationed along the coast of Texas. Arriving Pensacola, 24 October, the fighting supply ship began operating from that base, capturing Confederate schooner Course on 11 November and British schooner Maria the next day.

Kensington moved to New Orleans, Louisiana, 26 January 1863 and five months later set sail for New York City for long needed repairs. Back in fighting trim by 1 August 1864, Kensington functioned as a supply vessel for ships of the North Atlantic Blockading Squadron until 30 November. She sailed from Boston as a transport vessel on 7 December visiting Port Royal, Key West, Florida, Mobile, Alabama, Pensacola, and New Orleans. After returning to New York on 11 January 1865, Kensington made two similar voyages to Southern ports.

== Decommissioning ==
Kensington was decommissioned 5 May 1865. She was sold at public auction at New York to Brown & Co. on 12 July 1865 and redocumented 31 July. Kensington sank after colliding with an unknown sailing vessel at sea on 27 January 1871.
