= USS John P. Jackson =

Gunboat of the United States Navy

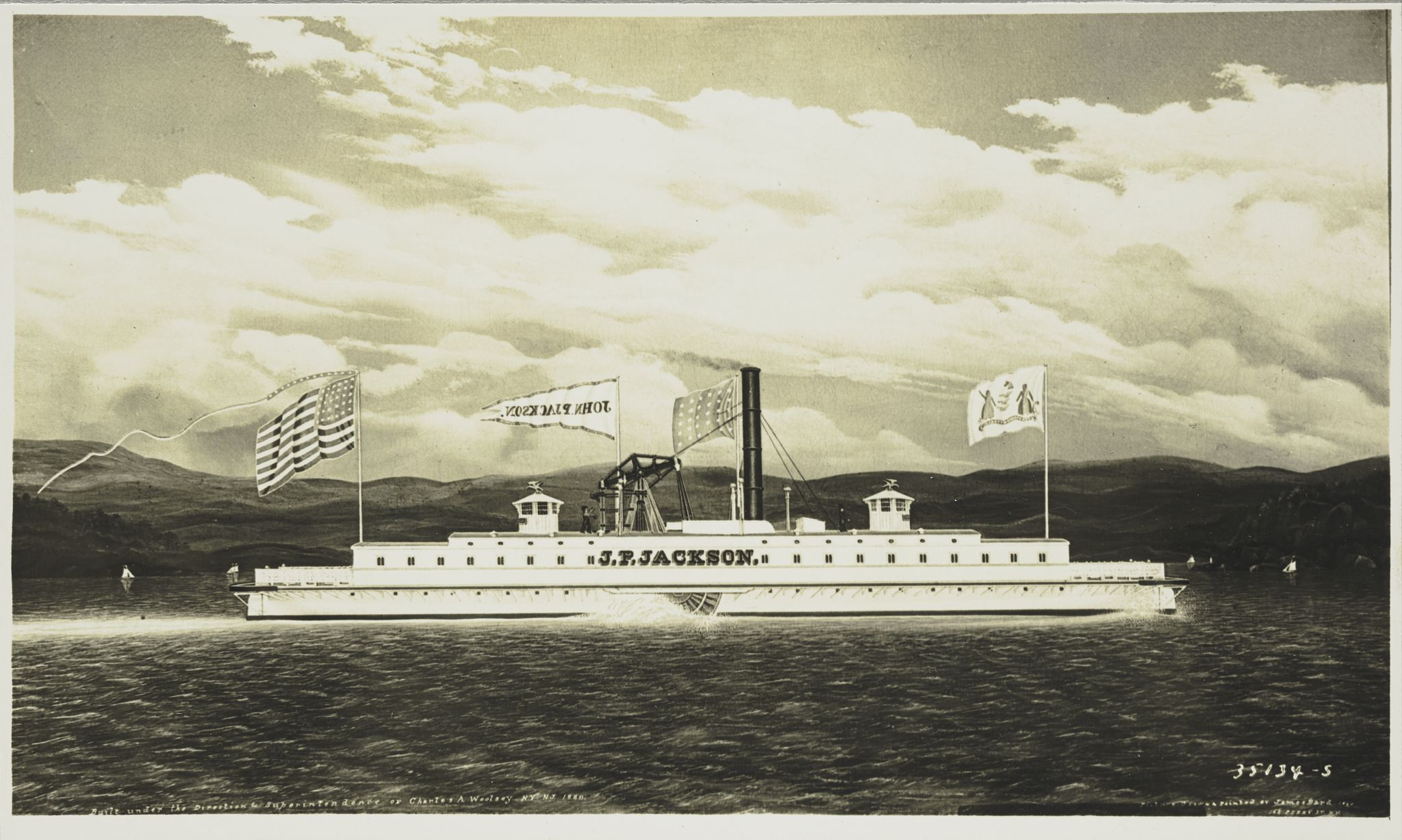
- John P. Jackson as portrayed in 1860

History

United States
- Name: John P. Jackson
- Builder: Devine Burtis, Brooklyn, New York
- Launched: 2 August 1860
- Acquired: 6 November 1861
- Commissioned: 14 February 1862
- Decommissioned: 5 September 1865
- Fate: Sold, 27 September 1865
- Notes: Civilian merchant use postwar; disappeared from shipping records in 1871

General characteristics
- Tons burthen: 750
- Length: 192 ft (59 m)
- Beam: 36 ft 6 in (11.13 m)
- Depth of hold: 12 ft (3.7 m)
- Propulsion: steam engine, side wheel-propelled
- Complement: 99
- Armament: four 32-pounder guns; one 9-inch Dahlgren gun; one 6-inch Sawyer rifle
- Notes: Sawyer rifle replaced with 100-pounder Parrott rifle in July 1864

USS John P. Jackson was a sidewheel steamer acquired by the Union Navy during the beginning of the American Civil War. Built in 1860, John P. Jackson was used as a ferry by the New Jersey Rail Road and Transportation Company. In February 1861, she ferried President-elect Abraham Lincoln on his way to his inauguration. She was purchased for use in the American Civil War on 6 November. Commissioned for military service on 14 February 1862, she was sent to Ship Island. On 4 April, she was part of a battle with Confederate vessels near Pass Christian, Mississippi. That same day, she captured the blockade runner P. C. Wallis. In April, she bombarded Confederate-held Fort Jackson and Fort St. Philip. Next month, John P. Jackson participated in a scout of Lake Pontchartrain.

After moving up the Mississippi River towards Vicksburg, Mississippi, John P. Jackson was damaged by Confederate fire on June 28. She was transferred to the Mississippi Sound on 30 September, where she served on the Union blockade through the following year and captured several prizes. In February 1864, she was part of a bombardment of Confederate-held Fort Powell at Mobile Bay, and during the Battle of Mobile Bay on 5 August, again bombarded Fort Powell. She spent the rest of the war on blockade duty. After the war ended, she was sold at New Orleans, Louisiana, to Marcy, Maury & Co. for $13,500. After the war, she was used as a merchant vessel under J. P. Jackson, disappearing from shipping records in 1871.

== Design and civilian use ==
John P. Jackson was built in Brooklyn, New York, in 1860, for use by the New Jersey Rail Road and Transportation Company as a ferry. Construction occurred at the Devine Burtis yard, with the machinery built by Fulton Iron Works. launched on 2 August 1860, and completed in October, she measured 777 gross tons and 750 tons burthen. A sidewheel steamer, the vessel was 192 feet (59 m) long, with a beam of 36 feet 6 inches (11.13 m) and a depth of hold of 12 feet (3.7 m). Power was provided by a 44 inches (110 cm) by 132 inches (340 cm) vertical beam engine. The vessel had a top speed of 8 knots (15 km/h; 9.2 mph). John P. Jackson ferried president-elect Abraham Lincoln across the Hudson River in February 1861, while he was journeying to Washington, D.C. to be inaugurated.

On 6 November, John P. Jackson was purchased for service in the Union Navy during the American Civil War, at a cost of $60,000. The United States government had directly requested the New Jersey Rail Road and Transportation Company to sell the ship, and while the company's leadership regretted the sale of the vessel, wanted to comply with the government's request. John P. Jackson was commissioned into military service on 14 February 1862, under the command of Lieutenant Selim Woodworth. She was armed with four 32-pounder guns, a 9-inch (23 cm) Dahlgren gun, and a 6-inch (15 cm) Sawyer rifle. In July 1864, the Sawyer rifle was replaced by a 100-pounder Parrott rifle. She carried a nominal crew of 99 in military service.

== Civil War service ==
=== New Orleans and Vicksburg ===
On 10 February, John P. Jackson was ordered to Key West, to join a fleet commanded by Commander David Dixon Porter. The vessel actually left New York Harbor on 22 February. While on the way, she arrived at Hampton Roads on 25 February and was found to be in poor condition, requiring a trip to Baltimore, Maryland, for repairs. Later sent to Ship Island, she arrived at that place on 30 March, as part of a gathering of ships done by Flag Officer David G. Farragut for an offensive against New Orleans, Louisiana. Beginning on 2 April, John P. Jackson was part of an offensive against the Confederates at Pass Christian, Mississippi. The Union strike force consisted of part of the 9th Connecticut Infantry Regiment and some artillery loaded aboard the transport Henry Lewis, accompanied by John P. Jackson and the steamer USS New London. The army elements were commanded by Major George Crockett Strong, while the naval elements were under the leadership of Lieutenant A. Read. After a stopover at Biloxi, Mississippi, the force continued on to Pass Christian late on 3 April. On the morning of 4 April, before the troops on the transport could disembark, the Confederate gunboats CSS Carondelet, CSS Oregon, and CSS Pamlico engaged the Union vessels. After over an hour of fighting, the Confederate vessels withdrew with damage. John P. Jackson was struck by two shots, one of which damaged a stanchion and the other of which destroyed a sponson brace.

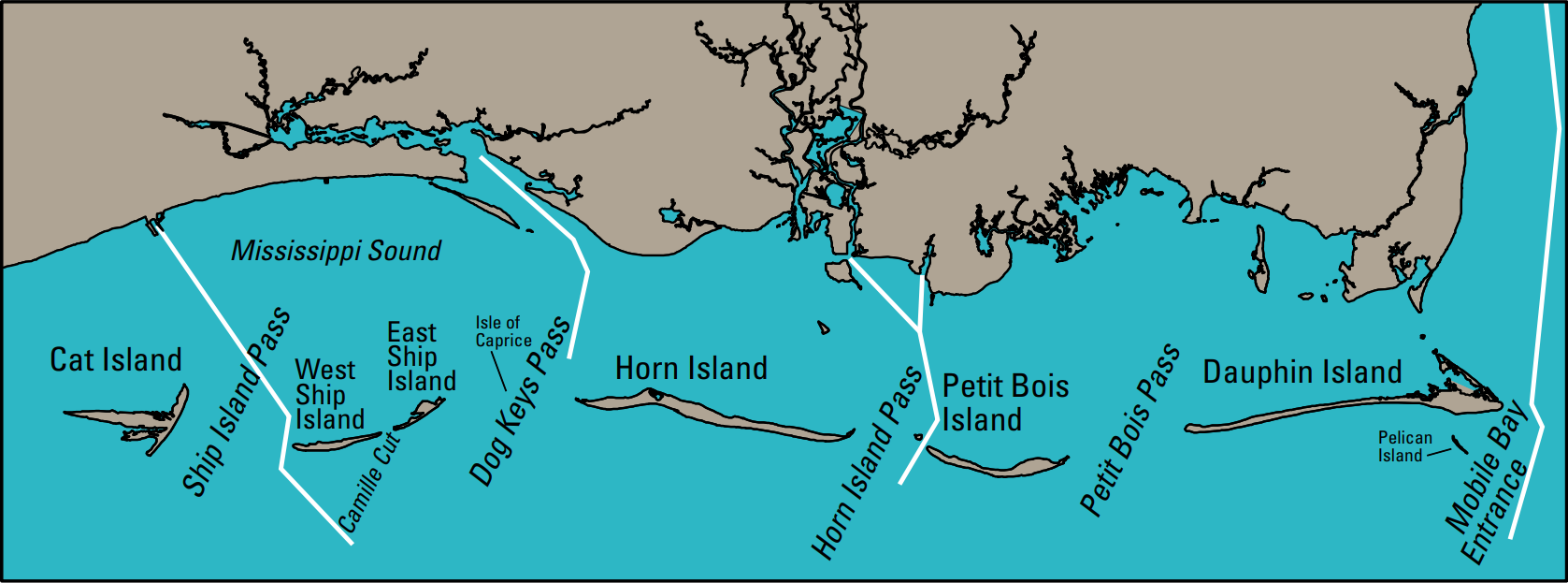
A map of Mississippi Sound, showing the location of Ship Island and other sites associated with John P. Jackson

Also on 4 April, the Union captured the Confederate blockade runner P. C. Wallis. John P. Jackson fired on the vessel, and then when it halted, boarded it. The blockade runner's flammable cargo was on fire, but this was extinguished. John P. Jackson then later towed a transport, Great Republic, to the passes at the mouth of the Mississippi River, while escorting Union Army troop movements as well. Beginning on 18 April, John P. Jackson took part in the bombardment of Fort Jackson and Fort St. Philip, which culminated in a group of ships led by Farragut passing the forts on 24 April. John P. Jackson had towed the sloop-of-war USS Portsmouth into its intended firing position, but the sloop broke free from its moorings and John P. Jackson had to retrieve the vessel from further downriver.

On 7 May, John P. Jackson, along with the steamer USS Sachem, the former revenue cutter USS Harriet Lane, the steamer USS Westfield, the Unadilla-class gunboat USS Owasco, and the steamer USS Clifton, began an expedition to Mobile Bay. The vessels arrived that afternoon, and on the next day, Clifton ran aground. John P. Jackson attempt to free Clifton, but had too deep of a draft and was unable to get close enough to Clifton. The rescue was instead performed by Sachem. On 9 May, Sachem, John P. Jackson, Clifton, and Westfield were ordered to scout the Pearl River and Lake Pontchartrain. The vessels entered Lake Pontchartrain on 13 May and entered the Tchefuncte River that evening. The next day, John P. Jackson ran aground while steaming towards the Rigolets and was unable to accompany the other vessels on their scout to the Pearl River.

By June, John P. Jackson had been transferred to the Vicksburg, Mississippi, area, in support of Farragut's command. On 28 June, Farragut's vessels ran upriver past the Vicksburg batteries. John P. Jackson was among a group of vessels commanded by Porter that provided covering fire. During the engagement, Porter had the vessels move closer to the batteries. A Confederate artillery round struck John P. Jackson's wheelhouse and knocked out her steering capabailities. Clifton tried to come to John P. Jackson's aid but took a round through the boiler. John P. Jackson then rescued sailors driven overboard from Clifton by the clouds of steam released from the boiler. A second projectile strike damaged John P. Jackson's starboard sidewheel. The vessel reported firing 117 shots during the battle.

=== Gulf blockading ===
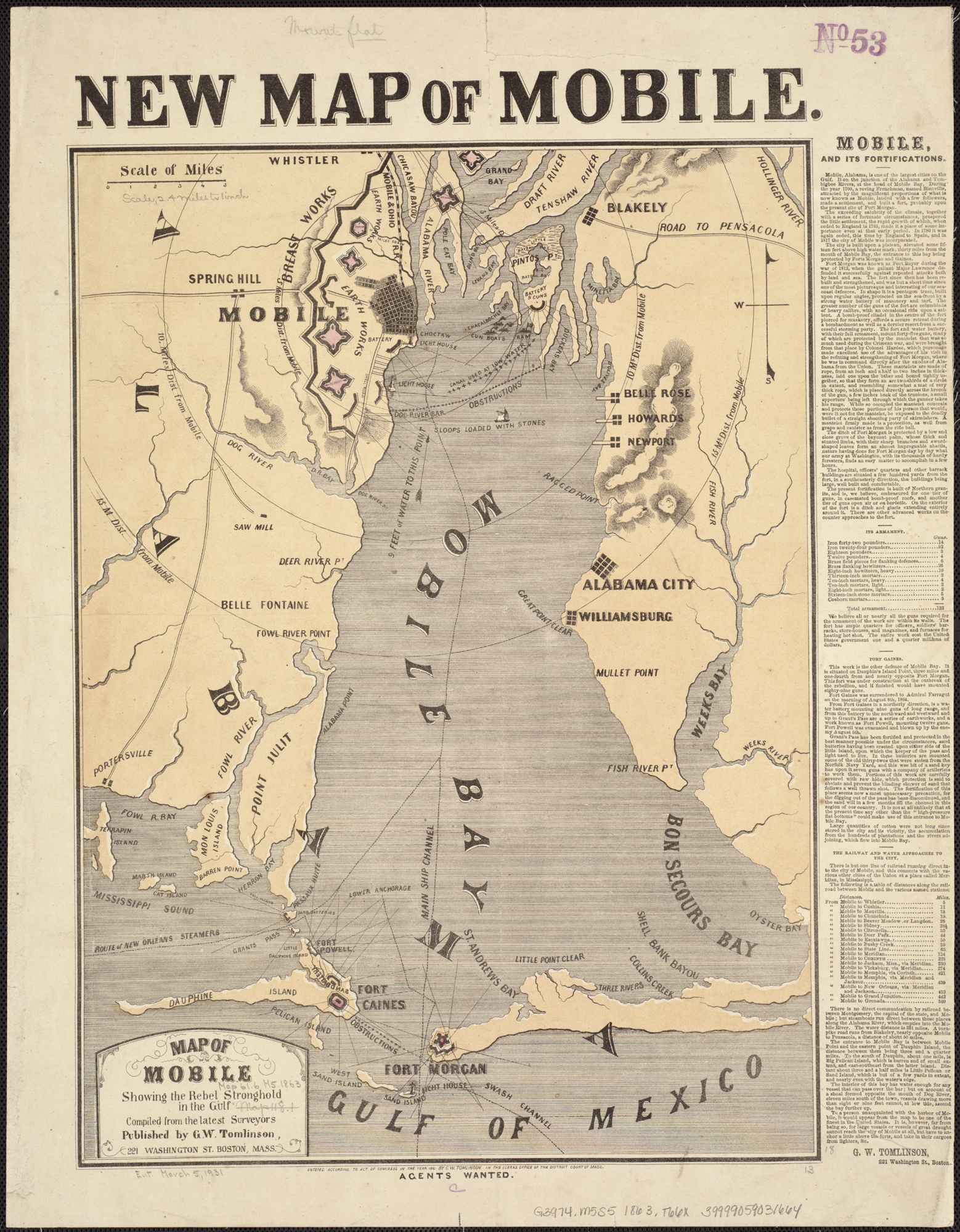
Map of Confederate defenses of Mobile Bay. Fort Powell and Grant's Pass are in the lower right of the map, above Fort Gaines.

John P. Jackson was later sent to New Orleans for repairs. She was transferred to the Mississippi Sound on 30 September; she spent the rest of the war in that area. A fire onboard damaged her on 8 October, and she had to travel to Ship Island for repairs. Farragut was displeased that Woodworth did not order the chase of suspicious steamers earlier sighted by John P. Jackson in Mississippi Sound and on 15 October stated that he was going to subject Woodworth to a court of inquiry. On 21 October, John P. Jackson captured the sloop Young Gustave. The court of inquiry was resolved the next day and Woodworth was allowed to remain in command. Woodworth had received permission in late September to be transferred from John P. Jackson, and command passed of Lieutenant Commander Henry A. Adams Jr. Continuing on blockade duty, she captured the Cuba and Belle of Mobile the next day. On 12 January 1863, she took the prizes Le Caddie and Union. Farragut reassigned Adams to command the sloop-of-war USS Vincennes in February, and Acting Master N. D'Oyley was assigned to command John P. Jackson. In July, Acting Volunteer Lieutenant Lewis W. Pennington was ordered to replace D'Oyley in command of the vessel. On 12 September, the steamer USS Calhoun, John P. Jackson, and the doubler-ender gunboat USS Genesee forced the steamer Fanny to run aground; the Confederate vessel's crew then burned her to prevent capture. The next day, the Union vessels fired on a steamer named Jeff Davis and silenced a Confederate position at Grant's Pass. On 21 October, John P. Jackson then captured the schooner Syrena, near Deer Island.

In January 1864, Acting Master Miner B. Crowell was ordered to take command of John P. Jackson temporarily. On 16 February, John P. Jackson participated in operations against the Confederate defenders of Mobile Bay by towing three schooners to a point where they could bombard Fort Powell and also firing on the fort herself. The Sawyer rifle suffered vent damage during the bombardment and was rendered useless. A replacement Sawyer rifle was received from the sloop-of-war USS Hartford on 27 February. Until the Union naval victory at Mobile Bay on 5 August, John P. Jackson supported the campaign against Mobile, spending time at New Orleans. John P. Jackson's role in the fighting on 5 August was to bombard Fort Powell, along with the double-ender gunboat USS Conemaugh, the steamer USS Narcissus, the tinclad USS Stockdale, and the steamer USS Estrella. Back on blockade duty in the Mississippi Sound, John P. Jackson captured the schooner Medora on 8 December. She continued on blockade duty with the West Gulf Blockading Squadron for the rest of the war. Lieutenant A. R. Yates was listed as her commander on 1 February 1865. By 1 July, she had been earmarked for sale and was at Pensacola, Florida. She was decommissioned at New Orleans on 5 September 1865. During her time in military service, John P. Jackson required $32,012.66 in repairs. She was sold at auction to Marcy, Maury & Co. for $13,500 on 27 September. After the war, she was used as a merchant vessel under the name J. P. Jackson and ceased to appear in shipping records in 1871.

== Sources ==
=== Secondary ===
- Baxter, Raymond J.; Adams, Arthur G. (1999). Railroad Ferries of the Hudson and Stories of a Deckhand. New York City: Fordham University Press. ISBN 0-8232-1954-2.
- Browning, Robert M. (2015). Lincoln's Trident: The West Gulf Blockading Squadron During the Civil War. Tuscaloosa, Alabama: University of Alabama Press. ISBN 978-0-8173-1846-8.
- Chatelain, Neil P. (2020). Defending the Arteries of Rebellion: Confederate Naval Operations in the Mississippi River Valley, 1861–1865. El Dorado Hills, California: Savas Beatie. ISBN 978-1-61121-510-6.
- Civil War Naval Chronology, 1861–1865. Washington, D.C.: Naval History Division. 1971.
- Collea, Joseph D. (2018). New York and the Lincoln Specials: The President's Pre-Inaugural and Funeral Trains Cross the Empire State. Jefferson, North Carolina: McFarland & Co. ISBN 978-1-4766-7075-1.
- Lytle, William M. (1952). Merchant Steam Vessels of the United States 1807–1868. Mystic, Connecticut: The Steamship Historical Society of America. OCLC 7195533.
- Silverstone, Paul H. (1989). Warships of the Civil War Navies. Annapolis, Maryland: Naval Institute Press. ISBN 0-87021-783-6.

=== Primary ===
- Adams, H. A. (1905). "Order of Lieutenant-Commander Adams, U.S. Navy, to Acting Volunteer Lieutenant Pennington, U.S. Navy". In Stewart, Charles W. (ed.). Official Records of the Union and Confederate Navies in the War of the Rebellion. 1. Vol. 20. Washington, D.C.: Government Printing Office. p. 411. OCLC 427057.
- Bell, H. H. (1905). "Report of Commodore Bell, U.S. Navy, Referring to the Return of Acting Lieutenant Woodworth, U.S. Navy, to the Command of the U.S.S. John P. Jackson". In Stewart, Charles W. (ed.). Official Records of the Union and Confederate Navies in the War of the Rebellion. 1. Vol. 19. Washington, D.C.: Government Printing Office. p. 311. OCLC 427057.
- Bell, H. H. (1906). "Order of Commodore Bell, U.S. Navy, to Acting Master Crowell, U.S. Navy, to Assume Command of the U.S.S. J. P. Jackson". In Stewart, Charles W. (ed.). Official Records of the Union and Confederate Navies in the War of the Rebellion. 1. Vol. 21. Washington, D.C.: Government Printing Office. p. 29. OCLC 427057.
- Farragut, D. G. (1905a). "Order of Rear-Admiral Farragut, U.S. Navy, to Acting Volunteer Lieutenant Woodworth, U.S. Navy, Regarding the Institution of a Court of Enquiry; October 15, 1862". In Stewart, Charles W. (ed.). Official Records of the Union and Confederate Navies in the War of the Rebellion. 1. Vol. 19. Washington, D.C.: Government Printing Office. p. 303. OCLC 427057.
- Farragut, D. G. (1905b). "Report of Rear-Admiral Farragut, U.S. Navy, Regarding Changes in Assignment of Officers". In Stewart, Charles W. (ed.). Official Records of the Union and Confederate Navies in the War of the Rebellion. 1. Vol. 19. Washington, D.C.: Government Printing Office. p. 622. OCLC 427057.
- Jenkins, Thornton A. (1905). "Report of Captain Jenkins, U.S. Navy, Regarding Measures for the Restriction of Blockade Runners in Mississippi Sound". In Stewart, Charles W. (ed.). Official Records of the Union and Confederate Navies in the War of the Rebellion. 1. Vol. 19. Washington, D.C.: Government Printing Office. p. 347. OCLC 427057.
- Marston, John (1904). "Report of Captain Marston, U.S. Navy, Senior Officer at Hampton Roads, Va., Regarding the Arrival of the U.S.S. John P. Jackson in Crippled Condition and the Reported Grounding of the U.S.S. R. B. Forbes; February 26, 1862". In Stewart, Charles W. (ed.). Official Records of the Union and Confederate Navies in the War of the Rebellion. 1. Vol. 18. Washington, D.C.: Government Printing Office. p. 41. OCLC 427057.
- Official Records of the Union and Confederate Navies in the War of the Rebellion, Series 2. U. S. Naval War Records Office. Office memoranda. Vol. 1. Washington, D.C.: Government Printing Office. 1921. OCLC 5194016.
- Stewart, Charles W., ed. (1904). "Abstract Log U.S.S. John P. Jackson, Acting Lieutenant Woodworth, Commanding". Official Records of the Union and Confederate Navies in the War of the Rebellion. 1. Vol. 18. Washington, D.C.: Government Printing Office. pp. 384–386. OCLC 427057.
- Stewart, Charles W., ed. (1906). "Abstract Log of the U.S.S. J. P. Jackson, Acting Volunteer Lieutenant M. B. Crowell, U.S. Navy, Commanding". Official Records of the Union and Confederate Navies in the War of the Rebellion. 1. Vol. 21. Washington, D.C.: Government Printing Office. pp. 101–103. OCLC 427057.
- Stewart, Charles W., ed. (1908). "List of Vessels Belonging to West Gulf Squadron, February 1, 1865". Official Records of the Union and Confederate Navies in the War of the Rebellion. 1. Vol. 22. Washington, D.C.: Government Printing Office. p. 25. OCLC 427057.
- Stewart, Charles W., ed. (1908). "Vessels of West Gulf Squadron, July 1, 1865". Official Records of the Union and Confederate Navies in the War of the Rebellion. 1. Vol. 22. Washington, D.C.: Government Printing Office. pp. 230–231. OCLC 427057.
- Woodworth, Selim E. (1904). "Report of Lieutenant Woodworth, U.S. Navy, Commanding U.S.S. John P. Jackson; June 30, 1862". In Stewart, Charles W. (ed.). Official Records of the Union and Confederate Navies in the War of the Rebellion. 1. Vol. 18. Washington, D.C.: Government Printing Office. p. 622. OCLC 427057.
