= USS Horace Beals =

Cargo ship of the United States Navy

History

United States
- Acquired: 14 September 1861
- Commissioned: 5 February 1862
- Decommissioned: circa 30 May 1865
- Fate: Sold, 30 May 1865

General characteristics
- Tonnage: 296
- Length: 121 ft 6 in (37.03 m)
- Beam: 30 ft 8 in (9.35 m)
- Depth of hold: 11 ft 8 in (3.56 m)
- Propulsion: sail
- Armament: one 32-pounder gun; one 30-pounder gun

USS Horace Beals was a barkentine acquired by the Union Navy during the American Civil War. She was placed into service as a cargo ship assigned to support the fleet blockading the ports of the Confederate States of America. However, at times, Horace Beals was assigned extra tasks, such as that of a hospital ship as well as an ammunition ship.

== Service history ==
Horace Beals was purchased in New York City 14 September 1861; and commissioned at New York Navy Yard 5 February 1862, Lt. Comdr. K. R. Breese in command. Two days later she departed New York City for Key West, Florida, where, upon her arrival 23 February, she became a supply ship for the flotilla of mortar schooners being organized by Comdr. David Dixon Porter. The flotilla sailed from Key West 3 March, arrived Ship Island, Mississippi, and 5 days later crossed the bar at Pass a l'Outre. When, after almost a month of backbreaking labor, David Farragut finally succeeded in getting his heavy deep-sea ships inside the mouth of the Mississippi River on 16 April, he ordered the mortar flotilla to commence operations. Porter's ships, camouflaged with bushes and tree branches, moved up river to pre-assigned positions below Forts Jackson and St. Philip and opened fire 18 April. During the ensuing 6-day bombardment, Horace Beals kept the mortar schooners supplied with ammunition and provisions, took on board ordnance and other stores, and embarked and cared for sick and wounded from ships of the squadron.

After New Orleans, Louisiana, and the forts protecting her bad surrendered, the mortar flotilla sailed to Mobile Bay, Alabama; but Farragut then ordered Porter to return to the Mississippi River, where the mortars were needed to engage the enemy's cliffside batteries at Vicksburg, Mississippi. The Confederates had cleverly placed these guns high on the bluffs of the Chickasaw Hills perfectly safe from the low trajectory cannon mounted on the Union's salt-water ships. All vessels of Porter's flotilla were back at New Orleans 9 June. USS Kensington steamed up the Mississippi with Horace Beals and USS Sarah Bruen in tow 22 June. On the 26th the cruise upstream was enlivened by a duel with enemy batteries at Ellis Cliffs in which the Northern ships silenced the Confederate guns. The mortars opened fire on the batteries at Vicksburg 26 June and continued the attack while Farragut's ships ran by the thundering hillside cannon 28 June. They repeated the service when Farragut again ran the gauntlet on his return passage 15 July.

After withdrawing from the Mississippi River with Admiral Farragut, Horace Beals spent the rest of the year supplying ships of the West Gulf Blockading Squadron, operating from Pensacola, Florida, as a base. She was ordered back to New Orleans 22 December and arrived there 1 January 1863. She arrived below the Confederate batteries at Port Hudson 16 March two days after Farragut's heavy damage passing the enemy guns at that point. Horace Reals continued to supply ships operating against Vicksburg and Port Hudson until those last Confederate strongholds on the Mississippi were taken. During the remainder of the war this reliable supply ship operated between New York City and stations in the Gulf of Mexico bringing indispensable war material to ships of the West Gulf Blockading Squadron. Shortly after the end of hostilities Horace Beals was sold in New York City to A. Leary 30 May 1865.
