= Velocita =

Velocita may refer to:

- Velocita Wireless, a U.S. wireless-telecommunications service provider
- Treno Alta Velocità, a special purpose entity owned by RFI for the planning and construction of a high-speed rail network in Italy
- Velocità massima (English title: Maximum Velocity), a 2002 Italian drama film directed by Daniele Vicari

== See also ==
- Velocity (disambiguation)
