= USS Montgomery (1858) =

Steam gunboat of the Union Navy

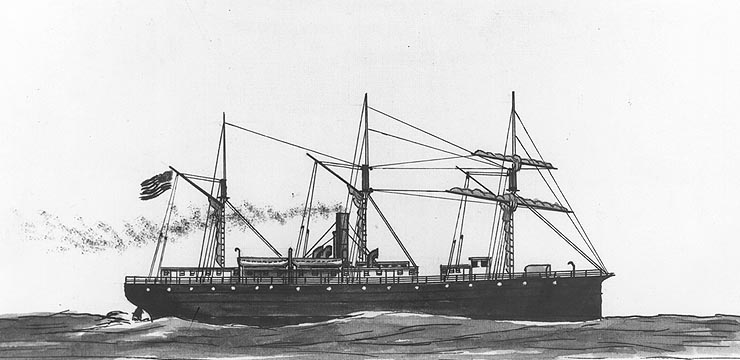
- USS Montgomery (1861)

History

United States
- Name: USS Montgomery
- Launched: 1858
- Acquired: by charter, May 1861; purchased, 28 August 1861
- Commissioned: 27 May 1861
- Decommissioned: 20 June 1865
- Fate: Sold, 10 August 1865

General characteristics
- Type: Steam gunboat
- Displacement: 787 long tons (800 t)
- Length: 201 ft 6 in (61.42 m)
- Beam: 28 ft 7 in (8.71 m)
- Draft: 15 ft 6 in (4.72 m)
- Propulsion: Steam engine
- Speed: 8 knots (15 km/h; 9.2 mph)
- Armament: 1 × 8 in (200 mm) gun; 4 × 32-pounder guns

The third USS Montgomery was a wooden screw steamer in the Union Navy during the American Civil War.

Montgomery was built at New York in 1858; chartered by the Navy in May 1861; purchased at New York 28 August 1861; and commissioned 27 May 1861 at New York, Comdr. O. S. Glisson in command.

== Service history ==
From June to November, Montgomery blockaded Apalachicola, Florida, off which she captured Finland, lacking proper papers, 29 August. In November, she began patrolling the coast from Washington to Cape Fear River, and on the 8th had a running fight with Tallahassee, the Confederate iron propeller. After temporary duty off Ship Island 2 December, she was attacked off Horn Island Pass two days later by Florida and Pamlico, but was not damaged.

Joining the East Gulf Blockading Squadron 20 January 1862, Montgomery reported off Ship Island three days later. She took schooner Isabel (formerly W. R. King) off Atchafalaya Bay 1 February, then carried dispatches to Tampa, Florida before joining the West Gulf Blockading Squadron to hunt for schooner Columbia off San Luis Pass, Texas, 5 April. Finding the schooner abandoned, Montgomery burned her, then captured a large sloop. Cruising the Mexican and Texas coasts, she helped free American citizens held in Mexico the latter part of April and took British schooner Will o’ the Wisp of the Rio Grande 3 June.

Further prizes were Blanche, chased ashore at Havana 7 October; Confederate steamer CSS Caroline, taken off Mobile, Alabama 28 October; and sloop William E. Chester, taken 20 November. She continued to blockade Mobile into 1863, then joined the North Atlantic Blockading Squadron, searching for Confederate cruiser Tacony off Nantucket Shoals in June and Confederate armed cruiser Florida in the same area in July. In August she joined the blockade of Wilmington for the remainder of the year.

Among her 1864 operations in this area were the capture of Pet 11 February; the destruction of blockade running steamer Dove 7 June; the capture of Bendigo, aground on Wilmington Bar 13 June; and the seizure of Bat off Western Bar 11 October. Other ships of the blockade aided in these captures. In December and January she joined in the attack on and capture of Fort Fisher.

In February 1865, Montgomery patrolled off Cape Fear River, engaging Half Moon Battery the 11th, then beginning a coastal patrol from Wilmington to Georgetown, South Carolina, 24 February. Decommissioning at Philadelphia Navy Yard 20 June 1865, she was sold at public auction 10 August 1865, redocumented 1 April 1866, and was in merchant service into 1877.

== See also ==
- Confederate States Navy
