= USS Velocity =

USS Velocity is a name the U.S. Navy has used more than once in naming its warships:

- USS Velocity (1862), was a British blockade-running schooner captured by USS Kensington and USS Rachel Seaman at Sabine, Texas, on 25 September 1862.
- USS Velocity (SP-446) was constructed at Morris Heights, New York, by the noted boat-builder, Charles L. Seabury, and owned by W. W. Stephens prior to World War I when she was inspected for naval service.
- USS Velocity (AM-128), was a minesweeper laid down on 21 July 1941 at Chickasaw, Alabama.
