= Fort Massachusetts (Mississippi) =

Coordinates: 30°12′44″N 88°58′20″W

- U.S. National Register of Historic Places
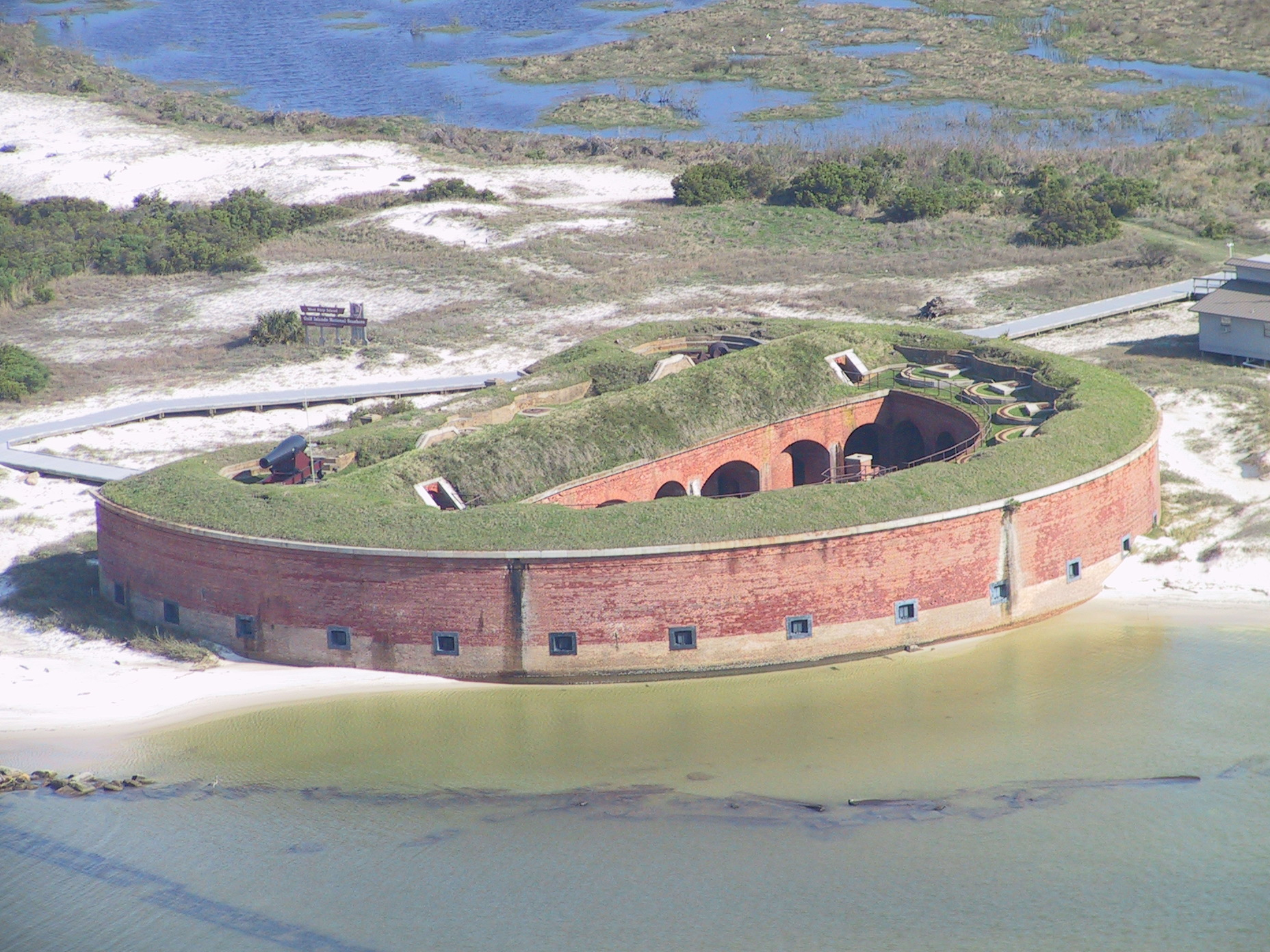
- Fort Massachusetts

- Location within Mississippi Location within the United States
- Nearest city: Gulfport, Mississippi
- Area: 85 acres (34 ha)
- Built: 1859
- NRHP reference No.: 71000067
- Added to NRHP: June 21, 1971

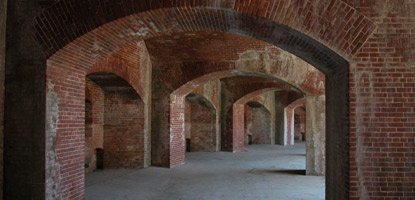
Interior view of Fort Massachusetts, prepared for tours.

Fort Massachusetts is a fort on West Ship Island along the Mississippi Gulf Coast of the United States. It was built following the War of 1812, with brick walls during 1859–1866, and remained in use until 1903. Currently, it is a historical tourist attraction managed by the National Park Service within the territory of Gulf Islands National Seashore. The fort is located about halfway along the north shore of West Ship Island, near a boat pier.

== History of the Fort ==
Following the War of 1812, the United States War Department began planning for the construction of an extensive system of masonry fortifications for coastal defense. Because of Ship Island's natural deep-water harbor and its location along a shipping route, Ship Island was important to the defense of New Orleans and the Gulf Coast. The island was declared a United States military reservation in 1847, and nine years later Congress authorized construction of a fort.

A site on the north shore, approximately 500 feet (152 m) from the western tip of the island, was eventually selected as the location for the fort. Construction began in June 1859 under supervision of the Army Corps of Engineers. The work was primarily done by civilians. The work force sometimes numbered as many as 100 men, and included carpenters, stonemasons, blacksmiths, and stonecutters. By early 1861, the outside wall of the fort stood 6 to 8 feet (1.8 to 2.4 m) above the level of the sand.

In January 1861, Mississippi seceded from the Union, becoming the second state of the Confederacy. One of the first acts of war in the state occurred on Ship Island when an armed band of Mississippi militia took possession of the island and the unfinished fort. The militia soon abandoned the island; and it remained deserted until early June 1861, when Confederate troops returned and mounted several cannons. On July 9, the Union Navy's USS Massachusetts came within range of the Confederate guns. The 20-minute exchange of cannon fire which followed resulted in few injuries and little damage, to either side. That action was the only military engagement in which Ship Island or the fort would be directly involved.

During the remainder of the summer of 1861, the Confederate contingent on the island worked with sandbags and timber to strengthen the walls of the unfinished fort. Despite their work, they abandoned the island in mid-September.

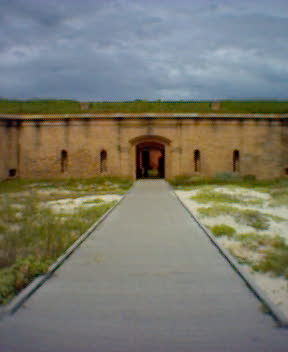
Entrance to Fort Massachusetts.

Union military forces soon occupied the island. Ship Island was used as the staging area for the Union's successful capture of New Orleans in the spring of 1862. As many as 18,000 U.S. troops were stationed on the island.

The island's harsh environment took its toll on many of the men. More than 230 Union soldiers eventually died and were buried on Ship Island during the Civil War. The remains of many of the casualties were later reburied at Chalmette National Cemetery, near New Orleans.

Through the remainder of the war (1862–65), Union forces made use of Ship Island. Union ships stopped at the island for repairs and to pick up supplies. The 2nd Louisiana Native Guard, one of the first black regiments in the United States Army, were recruited in Louisiana and stationed there for almost three years.

A hospital, barracks, mess hall, and bakery were just a few of nearly 40 buildings constructed on the island during the war. In addition, the Army Corps of Engineers resumed construction of the fort itself in 1862. It was during this period the fort was first called "Massachusetts," probably in honor of the USS Massachusetts. However, the fort was never officially named; it was referred to simply as the "Fort on Ship Island" in most official records.

Although the fort switched hands during the first year of the war, the only government to lay bricks was the United States. Between the beginning of construction and the secession of the Southern states (1859–61), the Army obtained its bricks from Louisiana. After U.S. authorities regained control of the island (1861–62), bricks were shipped from New England, down the East Coast and around the Florida peninsula. After the war ended (1865), the bricks were again procured in Louisiana. Still today, distinct color differences can be seen on the walls of the fort where different types of brick were laid.

The Corps of Engineers continued work on the fort until the fall of 1866. It was then turned over to a civilian fort keeper C.H. "Pop" Stone whose duty it was to maintain the fort in a state of readiness. After cannons were mounted, an ordnance-sergeant was assigned to care for the fort's armament. He eventually assumed all responsibility for the upkeep of the fort. The last ordnance-sergeant was relieved of duty in 1903, and the Ship Island lighthouse keeper became the fort's caretaker.

== Restoration ==
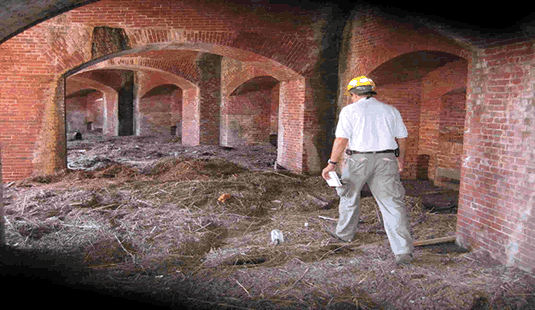
Debris from Hurricane Katrina inside Fort Massachusetts.

Fort Massachusetts had lain at the water's edge; and wave action, not to mention the salt air, had seriously eroded the historic mortar, especially around the northeast bastion. A "Save the Fort" movement started by Mississippians in the 1960s led to the establishment of Gulf Islands National Seashore. But, unlike the Cape Hatteras Light, Fort Massachusetts is made of tons of brick and concrete, and it could not be relocated.

Beach nourishment is one way of protecting the historic landmark. To save tax dollars, the National Park Service piggy-backs on dredge projects of the U.S. Army Corps of Engineers. The dredgers remove sand from ship channels and pump it toward the fort. A sandy beach is thereby created, as a barrier against the sea water lapping at the structure's walls.

In addition, employees from the Historic Preservation Training Center stepped ashore in December 2001 to re-point, replace, and reset, as needed, the brick walls of the fort—which hadn't been maintained since 1866.
