= CSS Josiah A. Bell =

History
- Name: Josiah A. Bell
- Namesake: Josiah A. Bell
- Operator: Confederate States Navy
- Fate: At the end of the war, she was operated on at Sabine Lake.

General characteristics
- Type: Steam gunboat
- Armament: 2 cannons.

CSS Josiah A. Bell, also known as CSS J. A. Bell, was a steam gunboat built in Jeffersonville, Ind., in 1853 and cottonclad at Sabine Pass the summer of 1862 for service with the Texas Marine Department. On 20 January 1863, acting as flagship for the Second Squadron, she steamed under command of Capt C. Fowler.

== Service history ==
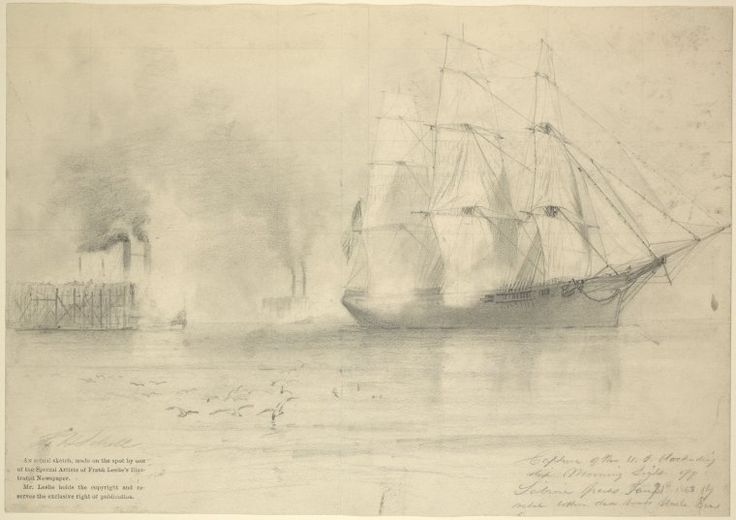
CSS Josiah A. Bell and CSS Uncle Ben captures USS Morning Light at Sabine Pass.

On 20 January 1863, acting as flagship for the Second Squadron, she steamed under command of Capt. C. Fowler and in company with Uncle Ben to engage the blockading sloop-of-war USS Morning Light and armored schooner Fairy, formerly Velocity. A lively 2-hour fight ensued in which army sharpshooters on board Josiah A. Bell repeatedly swept the decks of USS Morning Light and soon caused her to strike her colors, while Uncle Ben effected the schooner's unconditional surrender.

Josiah A. Bell remained a worry and threat to the blockading vessels off Sabine Pass. At the end of the war she was operating in Sabine Lake.
