= USS Morning Light =

Gunboat of the United States Navy

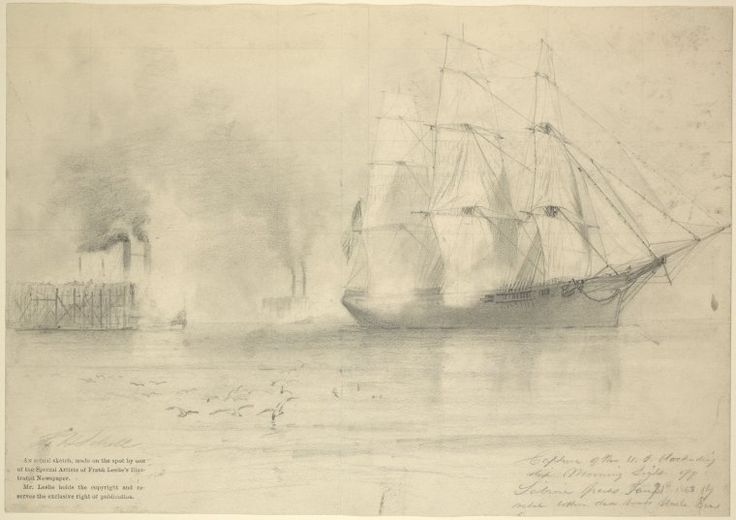
- CSS Josiah H. Bell and CSS Uncle Ben capture USS Morning Light at Sabine Pass.

History

United States
- Launched: 15 August 1853
- Acquired: 2 September 1861
- Commissioned: 21 November 1861
- Out of service: 21 January 1863
- Captured: Captured, 21 January 1863
- Fate: Burned, 23 January 1863

General characteristics
- Displacement: 937 tons
- Length: 172 ft (52 m)
- Beam: 34 ft 3 in (10.44 m)
- Draft: 19 ft (5.8 m)
- Depth of hold: depth of hold 24 ft (7.3 m)
- Propulsion: sail
- Armament: eight 32-pounder guns

USS Morning Light was a sailing ship acquired by the Union Navy during the American Civil War. She was used by the Navy to patrol navigable waterways of the Confederacy to prevent the South from trading with other countries.

== Service history ==
Morning Light, an eight-gun ship, was built in 1853 by William Cramp & Sons in the Kensington section of Philadelphia; launched 15 August 1853; purchased by the Navy 2 September 1861 at New York City; and commissioned 21 November 1861 at New York Navy Yard, Acting Volunteer Lt. Henry T. Moore in command. After fitting out for combat, Morning Light sailed from New York to cruise the lower U.S. East Coast in search of Confederate privateers and blockade runners. Morning Light returned to New York, arriving 28 February 1862.

Assigned to Flag Officer David G. Farragut's West Gulf Blockading Squadron, Morning Light departed New York in March with provisions for ships in the Mississippi Sound area. On 15 April Farragut ordered her to remain with bark USS J. C. Kuhn off Ship Island, Mississippi, as protection for the Army command of Maj. Gen. Benjamin F. Butler which provided occupation troops for New Orleans, Louisiana, after Farragut's fleet captured the city 25 April. By 27 May Morning Light was off Pensacola, Florida, performing blockade duties with sloop USS Vincennes. On 19 June sloop USS Florida, temporary tender for Morning Light, intercepted sloop Ventura, loaded with foodstuff for New Orleans, off Grant's Pass, Mobile Bay, Alabama.

Returning to Ship Island, Mississippi, in August, Morning Light left in November for Velasco, Texas. On 27 and 28 November, she sent several boat expeditions ashore to destroy the Confederate salt works at Cedar Lake. On 18 January 1863, Morning Light, Acting Master John Dillingham now in command, was ordered to blockade off Sabine Pass. Three days later two Confederate "cotton clad" steamers, Uncle Ben and Josiah H. Bell, with artillery and Texas infantry, attacked Morning Light and schooner USS Velocity in a successful effort to destroy the blockade at Galveston, Texas. Due to the calm weather, neither Union sailing ship could evade the Confederate fire, and both were forced to strike their colors. Morning Light, left a riddled wreck, was taken by the Confederates 21 January and burned two days later.
