= Velocity (disambiguation) =

Velocity is a quantity in physics that is related to speed.

Velocity may also refer to:

== Computing and technology ==
- Apache Velocity, a Java template engine
- Velocity (JavaScript library)
- Velocity (memory cache), from Microsoft
- Velocity (software development), a measure of productivity
- Dynamics (music)#Interpretation by notation programs

== Arts, entertainment, and media ==
- Velocity (album), by The Vels
- Velocity (character), a comic book character
- Velocity (film), a re-edited version of the 1960 film The Wild Ride, with new footage
- Velocity (newspaper), in Louisville, Kentucky
- Velocity (novel), by Dean Koontz
- Velocity (TV network), a Discovery Communications channel
- Velocity (video game), a 2012 shoot 'em up video game
- WWE Velocity, a wrestling television show
- "Velocity", a song by Sweet Trip from their album Velocity : Design : Comfort

== Other uses ==
- Velocity SE, an entry-level homebuilt aircraft
- Velocity XL, a high-performance homebuilt aircraft
- USS Velocity, several U.S. Navy warships
- Velocity of money, a monetary economics concept
- Velocity Tower, a tower in Sheffield
- Velo-city, a series of cycle planning conferences
- Velocity Frequent Flyer, frequent-flyer program of Virgin Australia whose airline call sign is "Velocity"
- V/Line VLocity, a type of passenger train used in Victoria, Australia
