= CSS Arrow =

Naval ship of the Confederate States of America

History

Confederate States
- Name: Arrow
- Owner: Confederate States Navy
- Fate: Destroying to prevent capture, 4 June 1862.

General characteristics
- Type: Sidewheel steamer
- Armament: 1 × 32-pdr

Arrow was seized by the Governor of Louisiana in 1861 and turned over to the Confederate Army. Fitted out as a gunboat, Arrow operated in Mississippi Sound protecting the water route between New Orleans and Mobile. On 13 July 1861 she steamed in company with Oregon to the vicinity of Ship Island Light where they sought unsuccessfully to lure USS Massachusetts under the shore batteries. She aided in removing Confederate troops from Ship Island, Mississippi, during September 1861. When the Confederacy evacuated New Orleans in April she sailed up the West Pearl River. There on 4 June 1862 she was burned to prevent capture.
