= USS Rachel Seaman =

Gunboat of the United States Navy

History

United States
- Laid down: date unknown
- Launched: date unknown
- Acquired: 21 September 1861; at Philadelphia, Pennsylvania
- Commissioned: 16 November 1861; at Philadelphia Navy Yard
- Decommissioned: 22 May 1865
- Stricken: 1865 (est.)
- Fate: Sold, 30 May 1865

General characteristics
- Displacement: 303 tons
- Length: 115 ft (35 m)
- Beam: 30 ft (9.1 m)
- Draft: 9 ft (2.7 m)
- Depth of hold: 9 ft 10 in (3.00 m)
- Propulsion: schooner sail
- Speed: not known
- Complement: not known
- Armament: two 32-pounder guns

USS Rachel Seaman was a wooden schooner purchased by the Union Navy during the American Civil War.

Rachel Seaman was armed as a gunboat and assigned to the Union blockade of the ports and waterways of the Confederate States of America. She also served as a storeship as the war came to an end.

== Purchased in Philadelphia in 1861 ==
Rachel Seaman was purchased by the Union Navy at Philadelphia 21 September 1861, and was commissioned at Philadelphia Navy Yard 16 November 1861, Acting Master Quincey A. Hooper in command.

== Blockade operations ==
The schooner sailed for the Gulf of Mexico between 4 and 10 November and reported to Flag Officer McKean off Fort Pickens, Florida on the 29th for duty in the Gulf Blockading Squadron. After briefly serving in Mississippi River Sound and the Mississippi passes, Rachel Seaman arrived off Galveston, Texas on 30 December and patrolled the Texas coast. On 11 January 1862, with gunboat USS Midnight, the schooner shelled Confederate batteries at Pass Cavallo and a week later engaged Confederate cannon at Velasco, Texas.

In the summer she performed blockade duty off Mobile Bay, Alabama, but in September returned to the Texas coast. On the 25th, with the USS Kensington and USS Henry Janes, she bombarded Sabine Pass, Texas, forcing the Confederate garrison to spike their guns and abandon the works there. The next day, landing parties took possession of the fort.

== Captured Prizes ==
However, want of occupation troops prevented the Union Navy from holding the area. On 6 October, Rachel Seaman captured British schooner Dart attempting to run the blockade at Sabine Pass. On 15 October boat crews from Rachel Seaman and Kensington destroyed a railroad bridge at Taylor's Bayou, Texas, preventing Confederate reinforcement of Sabine Pass with heavy guns. They also burned schooners Stonewall and Lone Star and Southern barracks.

Rachel Seaman took schooner Nymph off Pass Cavallo, Texas, 21 April 1863. Almost a year later, while sailing north, on 13 April 1864, she captured her last prize British schooner Maria Alfred off Mermentau River, Louisiana. The schooner arrived at New York City 21 May and for the remainder of the Civil War served as a supply ship along the Atlantic coast.

== Decommissioning ==
She decommissioned at New York City 22 May 1865 and was sold at public auction there 30 May 1865 to a Mr. Wiggins.
