= USS Velocity (1862) =

Gunboat of the United States Navy

History

United States
- Acquired: 30 September 1862
- In service: 1862
- Out of service: 21 January 1863
- Captured: captured by Confederate forces, 21 January 1863

General characteristics
- Displacement: 87 tons
- Propulsion: sail
- Armament: two 12-pounder howitzers

USS Velocity was a captured British schooner acquired by the Union Navy from the prize court during the American Civil War.

She was put into service by the Union Navy to patrol navigable waterways of the Confederacy to prevent the South from trading with other countries. Unfortunately for the Union Navy, she was captured, in turn, by the Confederate Navy off the Texas coast.

== Service history ==
Velocity was a British blockade-running schooner captured by USS Kensington and USS Rachel Seaman at Sabine, Texas, on 25 September 1862; and was purchased by the Navy from the Key West prize court, Key West, Florida, on 30 September. Velocity joined the West Gulf Blockading Squadron shortly after her acquisition, deploying with the blockade off Sabine Pass. There, on 25 November, she assisted Kensington, Rachel Seaman, and another prize vessel, Dan, in the capture of the British schooner Maria and the Confederate schooner Course. Velocity was, herself, recaptured together with USS Morning Light on 21 January 1863 at Sabine Pass, resulting in a temporary lifting of the Union blockade on the Texas coast. She is believed to have continued to serve as a Confederate gunboat, but her final disposition is unknown.

== See also ==
- Blockade runners of the American Civil War
- List of ships captured in American Civil War
