= USS Henry Janes =

Gunboat of the United States Navy

History

United States
- Laid down: date unknown
- Launched: date unknown
- Acquired: 27 September 1861
- Commissioned: 30 January 1862
- Decommissioned: 12 July 1865
- Stricken: 1865 (est.)
- Fate: Sold, 20 July 1865

General characteristics
- Displacement: 260 tons
- Length: 109 ft 9 in (33.45 m)
- Beam: 29 ft 8 in (9.04 m)
- Depth of hold: 9 ft (2.7 m)
- Propulsion: schooner sail
- Speed: not known
- Complement: not known
- Armament: one 13" mortar; two 32-pounder cannon

USS Henry Janes was a mortar schooner acquired by the United States Navy during the American Civil War. She was used as a gunboat and assigned to the blockade of ports of the Confederate States of America.

== Purchased in New York City in 1861 ==
Henry Janes was purchased by the Union Navy from her owners, Van Brunt and Slaght, at New York City 27 September 1861. She commissioned at New York Navy Yard 30 January 1862, Acting Master L. W. Pennington commanding. The two-masted schooner had originally been launched at Port Jefferson, Long Island by James M. & C. Lloyd Bayles in 1854. Her actual name according to Custom House records and newspaper items was the "Henry Janes."

== Blockading operations ==
Chosen by the department to be a part of Comdr. David Dixon Porter's Mortar Flotilla, Henry Janes was fitted with a mortar and proceeded to rendezvous with the other vessels under Porter's command at Key West, Florida. With the flotilla formed by the end of February, it sailed to join the West Gulf Blockading Squadron for the Mississippi River operations specifically aimed at the capture of New Orleans, Louisiana.

Henry Janes and the other ships passed over the bar and into the Mississippi River 18 March in preparation for the attack on Fort Jackson and Fort St. Phillip. Below New Orleans, Louisiana, the mortars opened fire on the forts 18 April and kept up a steady and devastating bombardment until Flag Officer David Farragut passed with his fleet 24 April, defeated the Confederate Squadron, and steamed triumphantly to New Orleans, Louisiana. The loss of this great shipping center, largest and wealthiest city in the South, was a disaster from which the South had no hope of recovery.

=== Mississippi River operations ===
After thus aiding in the key victory at New Orleans, the mortar schooners returned to Ship Island, Mississippi, 6 May. There they remained until they were called upon to aid in the bombardment of another Confederate stronghold -- Vicksburg, Mississippi.

Arriving below the city 20 June, Henry Janes and the other ships supported Farragut with their fire as he passed the batteries 28 June to join with Commodore C. H. Davis farther up the river. The ships remained off Vicksburg in July and Henry Janes bombarded the city's defenses on the 15th, before proceeding downriver, engaging shore batteries as she went.

=== Patrolling the coast of Texas ===
Assigned to the blockading forces off the coast of Texas, the schooner's next action, at Sabine Pass, was against Confederate batteries near Sabine City. The Union Navy vessels entered the pass 21 September and forced the defenders to evacuate their fortifications 4 days later.

Although Sabine City was captured, the Union Navy could dominate only the waters in the area as no occupying troops were available. Henry Janes returned to blockading duties, with occasional boat expeditions into the innumerable passes and inlets of the Texas coast. On one such expedition, 20 November 1862, an entire boat crew from the schooner was captured by Confederates at Matagorda Bay.

=== End-of-war operations ===
For the next 18 months, Henry Janes performed blockade and gunfire duties at various stations of the West Gulf Blockading Squadron. She was below Port Hudson in June 1863 and from February to May 1864 operated off Fort Powell, near Mobile, Alabama, and Pensacola, Florida. She was sent to New York 5 May 1864 for repairs to her hull and replacement of her mortar. The ship was subsequently turned over to the ordnance department 8 August, and assigned to the North Atlantic Blockading Squadron as an ordnance vessel.

== Post-war decommissioning and sale ==
Henry Janes sailed from New York 30 August to report in the sounds of North Carolina on ordnance duty. She remained there until sent north in June 1865, decommissioned 12 July 1865, and was sold to George Burnham Jr., 20 July 1865 at Portsmouth, New Hampshire.

== See also ==
- Union Navy
- Confederate States Navy
