= USS Sarah Bruen =

Gunboat of the United States Navy

History

United States
- Laid down: date unknown
- Launched: date unknown
- Acquired: 3 September 1861; at New York City
- Commissioned: 3 February 1862; at New York Navy Yard
- Decommissioned: 6 July 1865; at New York City
- Stricken: 1865 (est.)
- Fate: Sold, 15 August 1865

General characteristics
- Displacement: 233 tons
- Length: 105 ft 6 in (32.16 m)
- Beam: 26 ft 7 in (8.10 m)
- Draft: 9 ft 6 in (2.90 m)
- Depth of hold: 9 ft 1 in (2.77 m)
- Propulsion: schooner sail
- Speed: not known
- Complement: 35
- Armament: one 13" mortar; two 32-pounders

USS Sarah Bruen was a wooden schooner acquired by the United States Navy during the beginning of the American Civil War.

After being installed with a large (13") mortar, Sarah Bruen was used by the Union Navy, in its blockade of Confederate States of America ports and waterways, as a gunship whose main task was to bombard elevated targets which could not be reached by standard cannon or rifled guns.

== Commissioned in New York City in 1862 ==
She was purchased by the Union Navy at New York City on 3 September 1861, and was commissioned at the New York Navy Yard on 3 February 1862.

== Civil War service ==
=== New Orleans operations ===
The schooner was assigned to Commander David Dixon Porter's mortar flotilla and proceeded to Ship Island, Mississippi to support Flag Officer David Farragut's attack on New Orleans, Louisiana. The mortar schooners shelled the Southern riverside forts for a week before Farragut's deep draft ships raced past the Confederate batteries and captured New Orleans, Louisiana.

=== Mississippi River operations ===
The schooners sailed to the entrance to Mobile Bay which they blockaded until Flag Officer Farragut called them back to the Mississippi River to bombard new and increasingly strong Confederate batteries at Vicksburg. They shelled the Southern emplacements at that river fortress during Farragut's dash past Vicksburg to meet Flag Officer Davis's Western Flotilla.

While Farragut was above the forts awaiting troops for a joint Army-Navy attack on Vicksburg, the collapse of General George B. McClellan's peninsula thrust toward Richmond caused the Secretary of the Navy to recall Porter and twelve of his schooners for duty supporting Union Army operations in the Richmond/Washington theater. However, Sarah Bruen was one of the mortar schooners left on the Mississippi River. She remained in the West Gulf Blockading Squadron until ordered north in the spring of 1864.

=== Ordered to the East Coast ===
After repairs at New York, she was ordered to Port Royal, South Carolina, on 27 June 1864. The remainder of her active service in the Civil War was performed on blockade duty inside Charleston Harbor's bar.

== Decommissioning ==
She was decommissioned at New York City on 6 July 1865 and was sold at public auction on 15 August 1865 to a Mr. Rhinehart.
