= CSS Bienville =

History

Confederate States
- Name: Bienville
- Namesake: Bienville
- Owner: Confederate States Navy
- Builder: John Hughes and S. D. Porter
- Fate: Scuttled.

General characteristics
- Type: Sidewheel steamer
- Armament: 5 guns

CSS Bienville was a light draft steamer "substantially built" of yellow pine and white oak under contract by John Hughes and Co., at Bayou St. John, La., in 1861–62. Collaborating and inspecting for the Government in the Hughes yard was S. D. Porter, Acting Constructor, CSN. She was launched in February 1862 and delivered on 5 April. Her commanding officer was Lt. C. B. Poindexter, CSN. On 21 April 1862, as the battle of New Orleans impended, Bienville was still without a crew, consequently her officers were obliged to destroy her in Lake Pontchartrain to prevent capture.
