= USS Massachusetts (1860) =

Gunboat of the United States Navy

History

United States
- Launched: 1860
- Acquired: 3 May 1861
- Commissioned: 24 May 1861
- Decommissioned: 22 September 1865
- Fate: Sold, October 1, 1867

General characteristics
- Displacement: 1,515 tons
- Length: 210 ft 10 in (64.26 m)
- Beam: 33 ft 2 in (10.11 m)
- Propulsion: steam engine; screw-propelled
- Speed: 11 knots (20 km/h; 13 mph)
- Armament: one 22-pounder gun; one 42 cwt. pivot gun; four 82 cwt. guns

USS Massachusetts was an iron screw steamer purchased by the U.S. Navy on May 3, 1861, shortly after the American Civil War began.

She was used by the Union Navy as a gunboat in the blockade of Confederate ports. At war's end, she was outfitted as a cargo ship and served in that capacity until finally decommissioned.

== Service history ==
Massachusetts, an iron-screw steamer built in 1860 at Boston, Massachusetts, was purchased by the Union Navy on May 3, 1861, from the Boston & Southern Steamship Company. The ship was commissioned three weeks later, at Boston Harbor, under the command of Melancton Smith. Assigned to the Gulf Blockading Squadron, USS Massachusetts steamed south May 10, 1861, to anchor off Key West, Florida, departing there June 8 for Pensacola, Florida. The next day she took her first prize, British ship Perthshire, near Pensacola. She captured Achilles June 17 and 2 days later took Naham Stetson off Pass a L’Outre in coastal Louisiana. On June 23, she captured the Mexican schooner Brilliant and the Confederate blockade-running schooners Trois Freres, Olive Branch, Fanny, and Basile in the Gulf of Mexico. While Massachusetts was absent, the South had fortified Ship Island, and the batteries fired on her when she returned from Pensacola. She engaged the Confederate guns until she ran out of ammunition.

On July 13 she seized schooner Hiland near Ship Island, and next day engaged steamers Arrow and Oregon off Chandeleur Islands, forcing them to withdraw. USS Massachusetts captured blockade-running sloop Charles Henry near Ship Island August 7 and gained information on Fort Pike, which guarded the entrance to Lake Pontchartrain for the South. After repairs in early September, Massachusetts fortified Chandeleur Islands and set up a light there September 13. A landing party from the ship took possession of Ship Island September 17, thereby providing the Union Navy with a valuable shelter during storms and the base from which Admiral David Farragut would launch his attack on New Orleans, Louisiana. Returning to Ship Island September 20, USS Massachusetts attacked, causing the South to burn the barracks and desert Ship Island passage. USS Massachusetts operated near strategically important Ship Island through the remainder of the year. She thwarted Confederate efforts to transport freight through the passage December 2, captured a small fishing boat December 12, and turned back Oregon, Pamlico, Gray Cloud, and Florida at Mississippi Sound December 19.

Early in 1862 Massachusetts steamed northward to decommission at New York City February 28. Fitted out as a transport and supply ship, she recommissioned April 16 and operated along the Atlantic coast until decommissioning at New York City December 3. USS Massachusetts recommissioned March 10, 1863, and, but for a brief period late that summer, served the South Atlantic Blockading Squadron through the end of the war. She captured sloop Parsis in Wassaw Sound March 12 and with Commodore Perry captured blockade runner Caledonia May 30, 1864, south of Cape Fear after a 2-hour chase. In August she aided steamers Gettysburg and Keystone State in the capture of Confederate steamer Lilian. On March 19, 1865, USS Massachusetts struck a torpedo (mine), which failed to explode, in Charleston Harbor. She was decommissioned September 22, 1865, at New York City and was sold there, at public auction October 1, 1867. Documented February 11, 1868, as Crescent City, she served American commerce until 1872.
