= Ship Island =

Island in Harrison County, Mississippi, United States of America

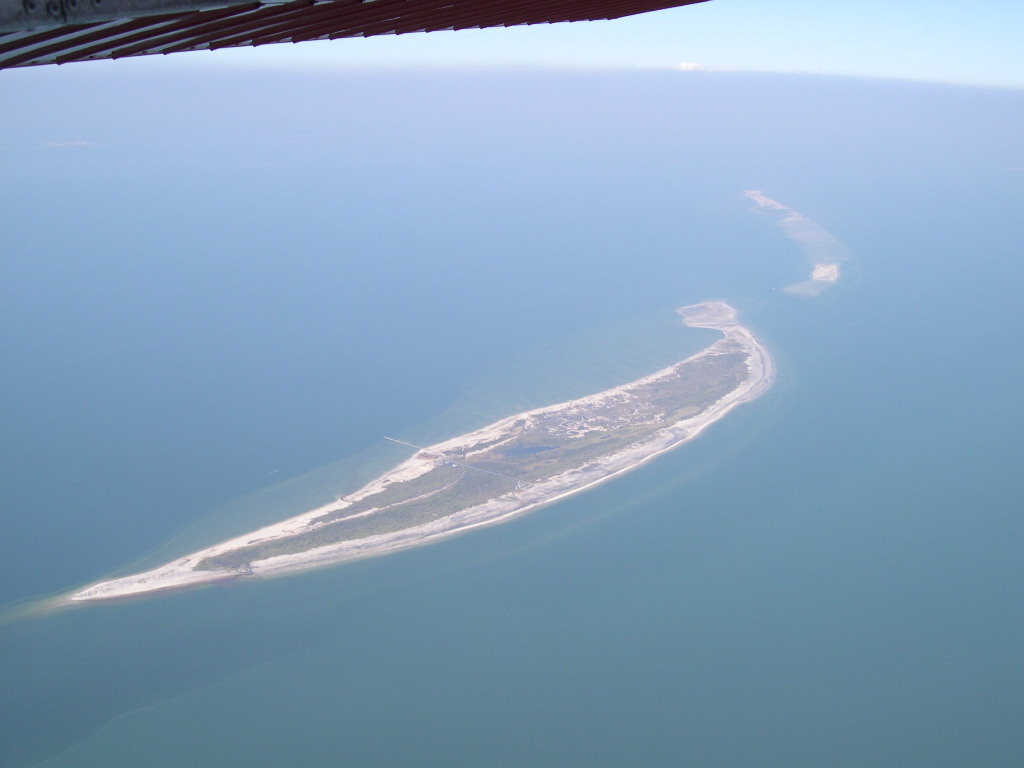
- Aerial view of previously divided Ship Island, looking east (with West Ship Island in foreground)

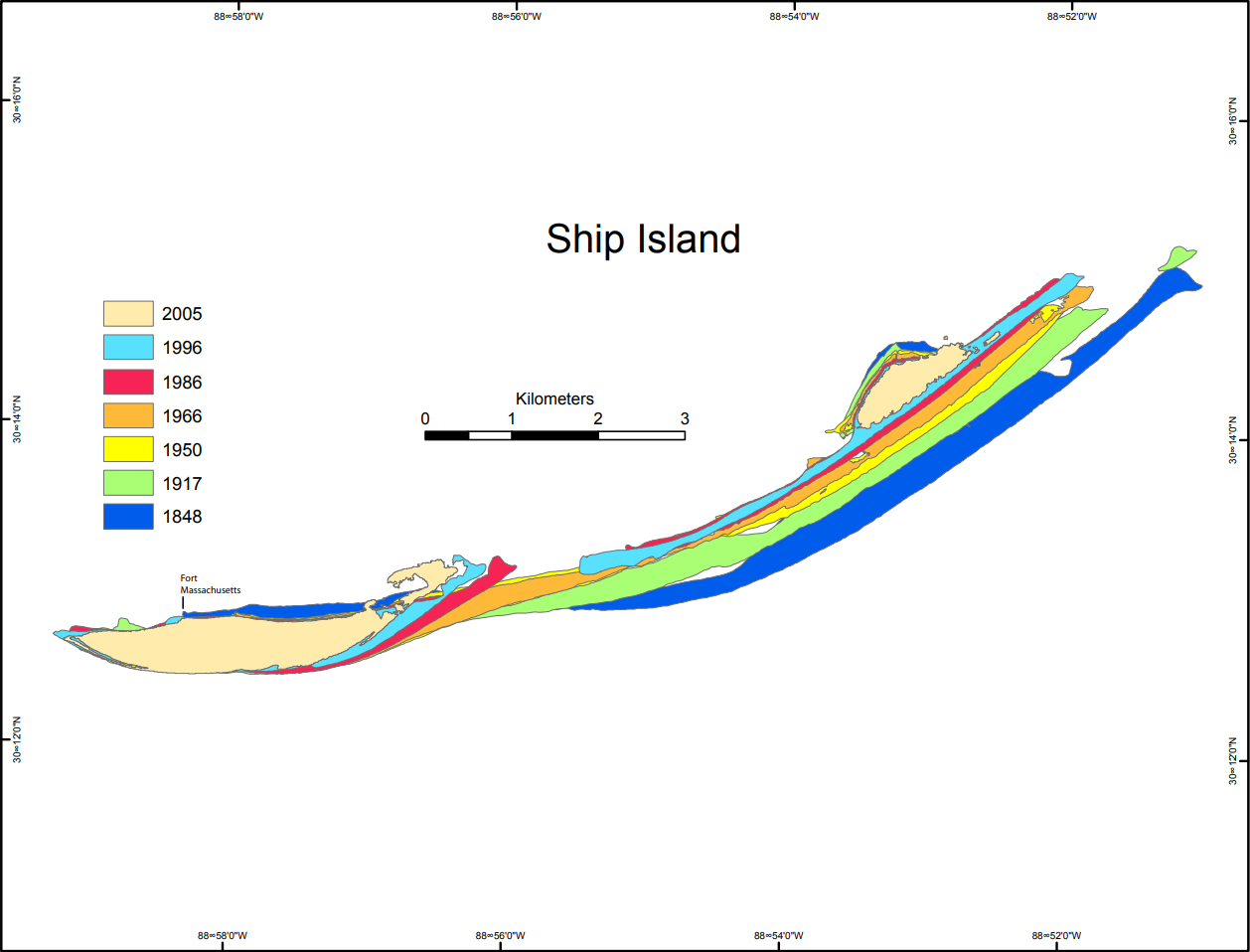
- Historical map of the changing geomorphology of Ship Island

- Location within Mississippi

Geography
- Location: Gulf of Mexico
- Coordinates: 30°13′N 88°55′W
- Archipelago: Mississippi–Alabama barrier islands

Administration
- United States
- State: Mississippi
- County: Harrison County

Ship Island is a barrier island off the Gulf Coast of Mississippi, one of the Mississippi–Alabama barrier islands. Hurricane Camille split the island into two separate islands (West Ship Island and East Ship Island) in 1969. In early 2019, the US Army Corps of Engineers completed the first stage of a project rejoining the two islands and recreating one Ship Island. Ship Island is the site of Fort Massachusetts (built 1859–66), as a Third System fortification. Both sides of the island (West Ship Island which includes the fort, and East Ship Island) are included in the territory of Gulf Islands National Seashore.

== History ==
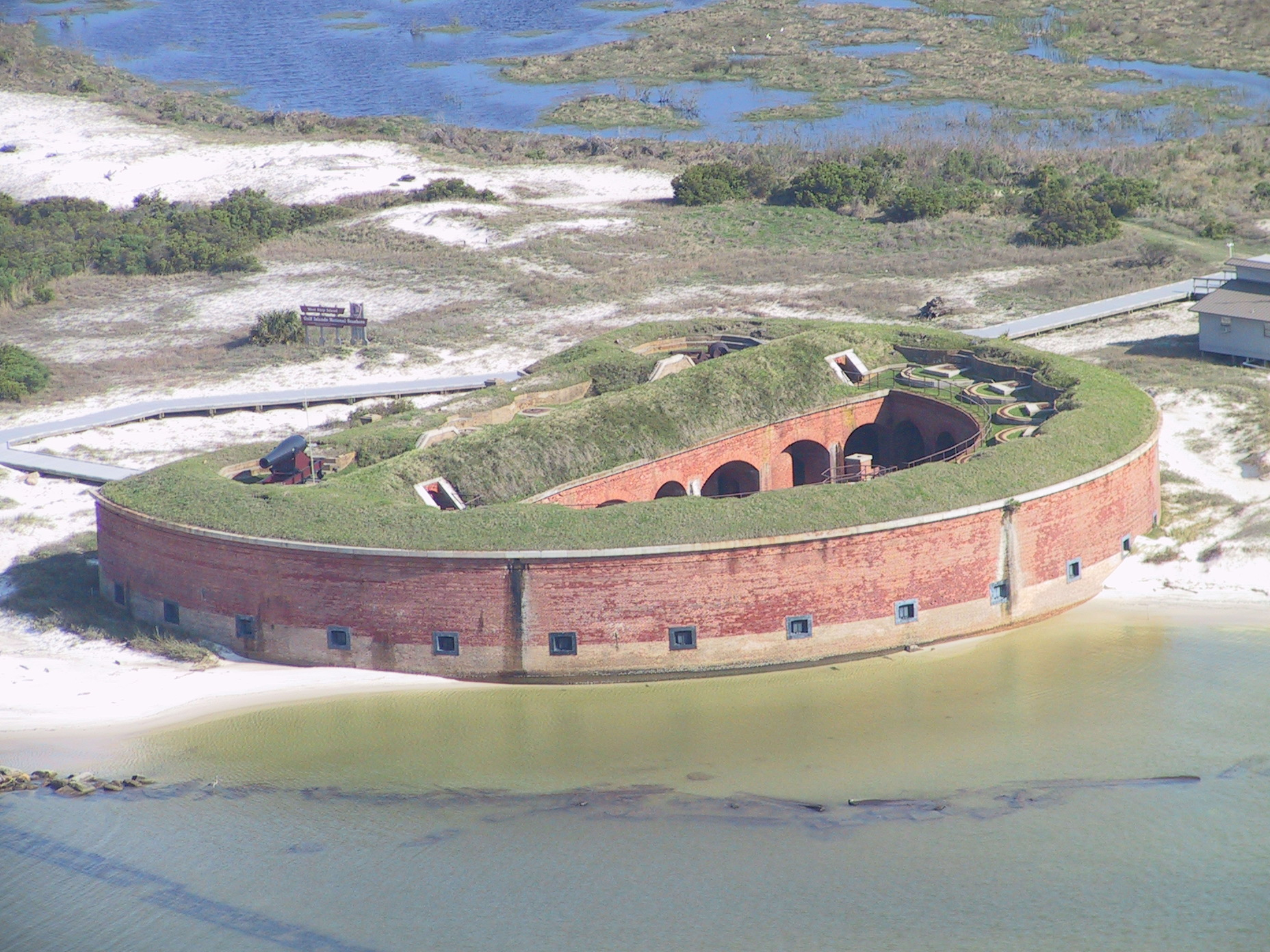
Fort Massachusetts

Having the only deep-water harbor between Mobile Bay and the Mississippi River, the island served as a vital anchorage for ships bearing explorers, colonists, sailors, soldiers, defenders and invaders. The French, Spanish, British, Confederate and Union flags have all flown over Ship Island.

French explorer Pierre Le Moyne d'Iberville charted Ship Island on 10 February 1699, which he used as a base of operations in discovering of the Mississippi River. The island served as a point of immigration to French colonies in the New World. Some immigrants died upon arrival at Ship Island, and their bodies were burned in a furnace.

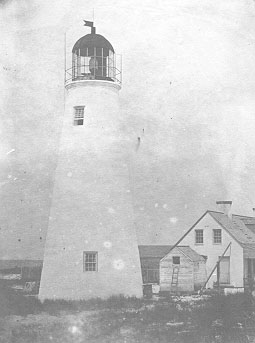
Ship Island's original brick and mortar 1853 lighthouse.

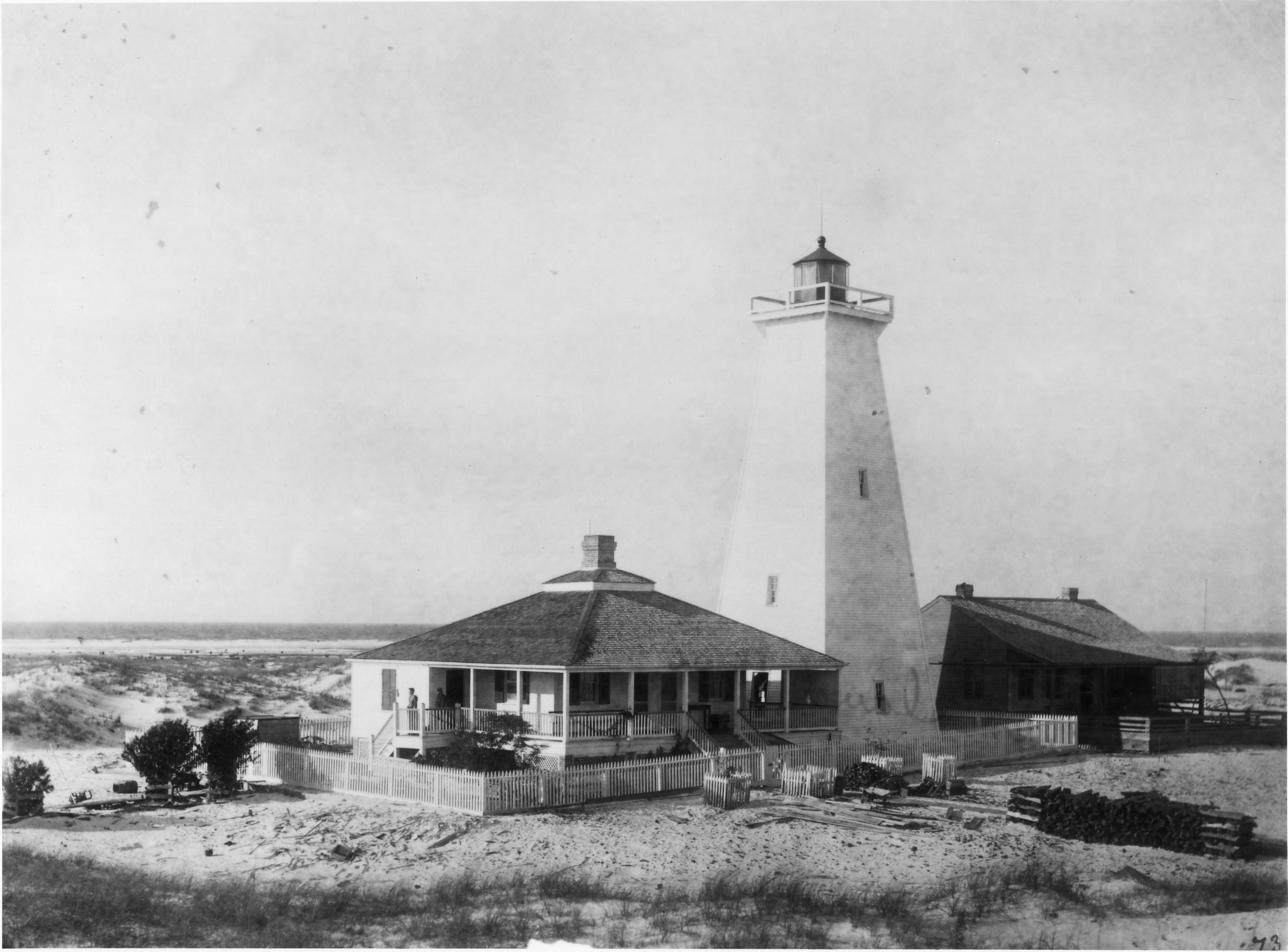
Ship Island's 1886 wooden lighthouse. It was accidentally burned down in 1972 by campers.

In 1702, the island was named Ile aux Vaisseaux (the French phrase for "Ship Island") due to its protected deepwater anchorage. After New Orleans was founded (1718) to the west, the island served as the principal port of entry from Europe for French colonists from 1720 until 1724. The island was given to Great Britain by France at the end of the Seven Years' War in 1763. In 1783, at the end of the American Revolution, Great Britain transferred the island to Spain.

The United States, as part of the Louisiana Purchase, claimed the island in 1810.

In the War of 1812, Admiral Sir Alexander Cochrane anchored between Ship Island and Cat Island with a fleet of fifty British warships and 10,000 soldiers in preparations for the Battle of New Orleans and the island was used as a launching point for British forces.

In 1849, the U.S. Navy anchored at Ship Island to discourage assembly of Filibuster mercenaries on nearby islands for paramilitary invasion of Cuba.

In 1853, the island's first lighthouse was built. It was made of brick and mortar.

In 1858, Mississippi passed legislation that gave jurisdiction over the island to the United States government. After the war, Congress approved an ambitious plan to construct state-of-the-art masonry fortifications at strategic locations along the Atlantic and Gulf coasts, including Ship Island. Construction of a fort on the island began in 1859, and continued up to the Civil War when the Confederates named the uncompleted structure Fort Twiggs after Confederate General David E. Twiggs. The island later became a prison for Confederate prisoners of war, and a base for the U.S. Second Regiment (Louisiana Native Guards led by Colonel Nathan W. Daniels), a unit composed of African-American soldiers. On July 9, 1861, a twenty-minute cannon exchange between Confederates in Fort Twiggs and the screw steamer USS Massachusetts occurred.

In 1862, the fort was renamed Fort Massachusetts in honor of the Union warship which had seized the abandoned outpost. Construction on Fort Massachusetts was halted in 1866, although the fort was not fully completed.

The January 4, 1862, edition of Harper's Weekly describes Ship Island:

SHIP ISLAND was occupied by the advance-guard of General Butler's expedition on 3d December: The troops consisted of the 26th Massachusetts and 9th Connecticut Volunteers, under command of Brigadier-General Phelps. They left Massachusetts in the steamer Constitution; their embarkation was duly illustrated in Harper's Weekly at the time. On 3d inst., as we said, they arrived at their destination, landed, and occupied the island without molestation. It is understood that they are to be followed by other troops, on whose arrival operations will be commenced against Mobile or New Orleans, or both. The following account of Ship Island will, with our illustrations, enable our readers to understand the importance of the movement:

Ship Island is situated in longitude 89°W and a little north of latitude 30°N, and is the property of the State of Mississippi. It is about sixty miles [97 km] from New Orleans, nearly the same distance from the Northeast Pass, at the mouth of the Mississippi River, forty miles from Mobile, and ninety from Fort Pickens. It lies between Horn Island on the east and Cat Island on the west, and is distant about five miles [8 km] from each. Some ten or twelve miles [19 km] to the north, on the mainland of Mississippi, are the towns of Biloxi, Pascagoula, and Gulfport. These towns are favorite summer resorts for the wealthy planters and merchants of the Gulf States, and, in consequence of a bar off their shore, are now the places of refuge for rebel gun-boats.

Ship Island is somewhat undulating, and extends in a slight curve about seven miles [11 km] east-northeast and west-southwest. At West Point (the western end), where the fort is located, the island is little more than an eighth of a mile wide and is a mere sand spit, utterly barren of grass or foliage of any kind. This eastern end, or East Point, is about three-quarters of a mile in width and is well wooded with pine, cedar, and live-oak.

The whole island contains a fraction less than two square miles of territory. Excellent water can be obtained in unlimited supply by sinking a barrel anywhere on the place. The great advantage of this is too palpable to require comment.

The island possesses a very superior harbor, into which nineteen feet can be carried at ordinarily low water. It is situated north of the west end of the island. The anchorage, with water equal to the depth on the bar, is five miles long [8 km], and averages three and a quarter miles [5 km] in width. The harbor is safe for the most dangerous storms in the Gulf—those from the eastward, southward and eastward, and southward—and might be easily entered during these storms without a pilot if good light-houses were placed in proper positions. The rise and fall of the tide is only from twelve to fourteen inches [31-36 cm].

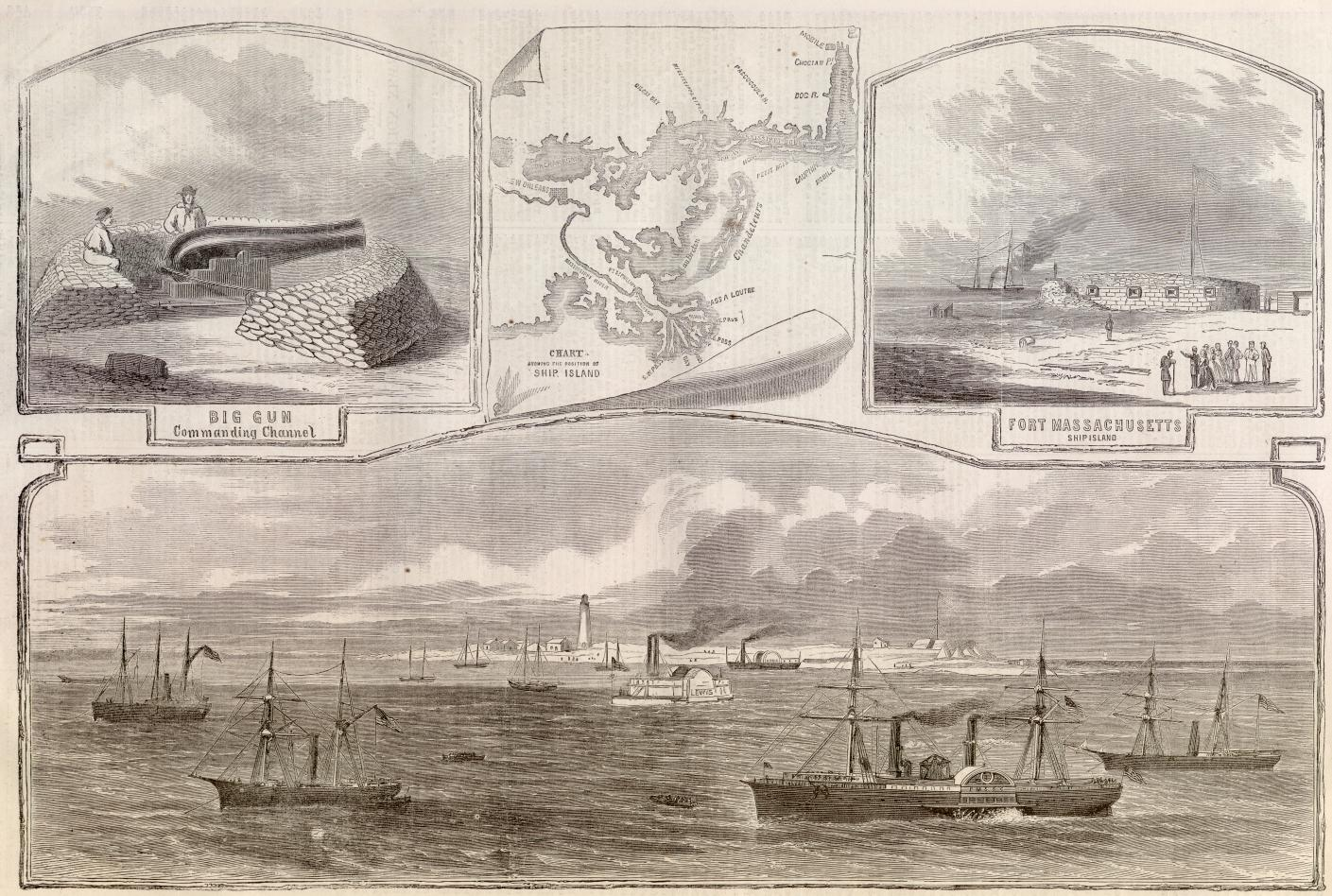
Accompanying Harper's Weekly January 4, 1862 illustration of Ship Island and Fort Massachusetts.

FORT MASSACHUSETTS, of which we give an illustration, is thus described in the Herald letter:

This fort, which is situated on the sand spit at the extreme western end of the island, is nearly circular in shape, somewhat resembling a pear in form. As I have stated elsewhere, its construction was commenced by the Federal Government, and when in a state of considerable progress was burned by the rebels, who afterward rebuilt and then abandoned it. It is of brick and rendered bomb-proof by sand-bags placed five or six feet deep in front of the walls.

The rebels built eleven casemates, and our forces have built two more since they have occupied the fort. The casemates are bomb-proof. The fort is at present but one tier high. It is provided with Dahlgren's 9-inch [229 mm] shell guns of very heavy calibre and in perfect order, and they are hourly expecting sixteen more very heavy guns from Pensacola. Besides this, Captain Manning's battery has landed five of their steel rifled cannon, with the Sawyer projectile. There were six of these guns on board the Constitution, but unfortunately, one of them was lost overboard in removing them from the transport. It is hoped that they will be able to recover it, as a buoy floats right over the spot where it fell. —Harper's Weekly, January 1862

In 1880, the island was designated as the country's first quarantine station. The fort closed in 1903, and the quarantine station was placed on reserve status in 1916.

In 1886, a wooden lighthouse was built to replace the brick lighthouse erected in 1853, which was damaged by waves.

During World War II, the Coast Guard used the island for anti-submarine beach patrol. In 1942, the Army Air Corps used the quarantine station as a military recreation facility, as did Keesler Air Force Base in 1955.

In 1969, Hurricane Camille with its 30-foot (9.1 m) tidal surge cut Ship Island into two distinct islands, to form East Ship Island and West Ship Island. The gap was known as the Camille Cut.

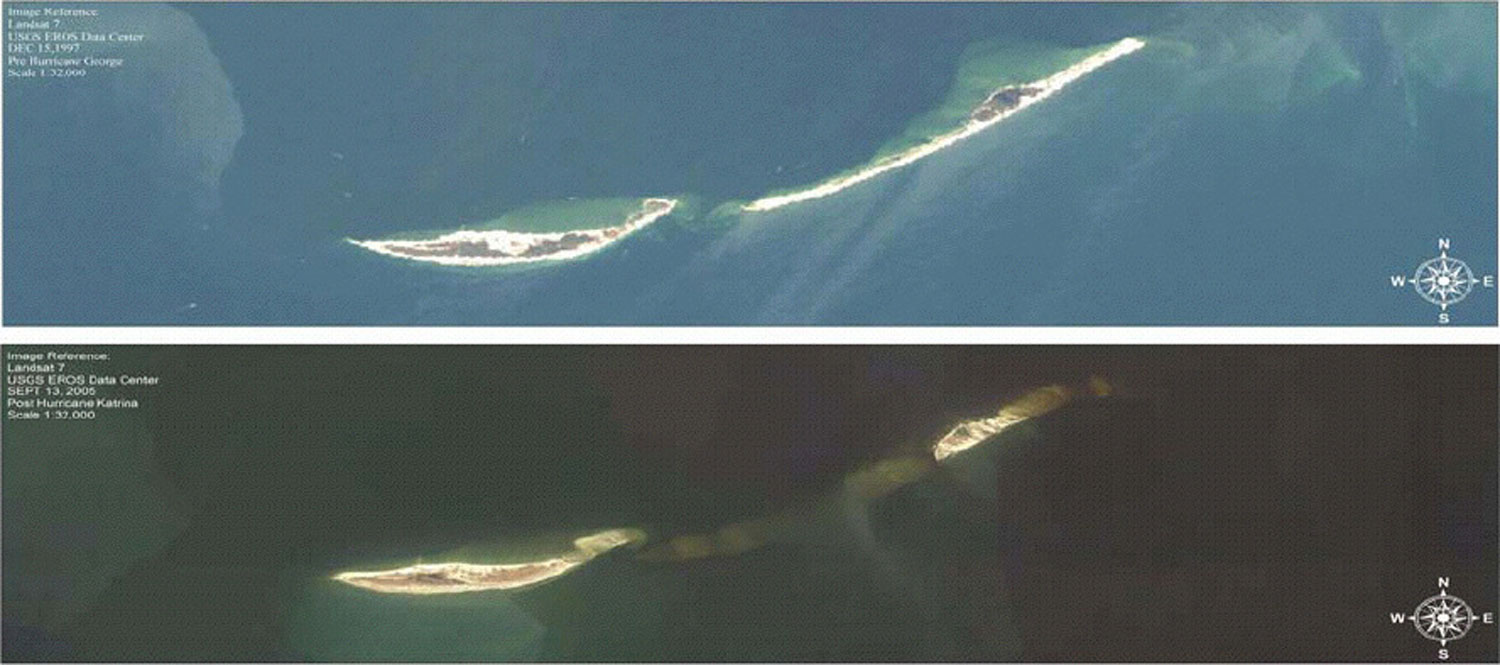
Ship Island before (top) and after (below) Hurricane Katrina.

In 1972, the original 1886 wooden lighthouse was accidentally burned down by campers.

In 1998, Hurricane Georges washed away a mile of East Ship Island's beach.

In 1999, Friends of Gulf Islands National Seashore dedicated a commemorative reproduction of the 1886 wooden lighthouse.

In August 2005, Hurricane Katrina almost completely submerged East Ship Island. West Ship Island received most of the developed property damage as Katrina's 30-foot (9.1 m) tidal surge wiped out the visitor and employee facilities on the island, as well as the island's pier and boardwalk. These facilities included offices and sleeping quarters for National Park Service staff, public restrooms and showers, and the public concessions building. Fort Massachusetts received minimal damage and was soon reopened to the public. The pier and boardwalk were rebuilt as well. Temporary restrooms and a small concessions trailer were on the island while new facilities were rebuilt. The reproduction of the 1886 lighthouse was reduced to rubble.

In 2008, Ship Island was surveyed just 2 weeks after Hurricane Ike. Scientists had a difficult time finding the island. The eastern half of the island had completely disappeared, leaving only parts of the western half. It is unknown whether the island was eroded by Hurricane Ike, or if erosion occurred when Hurricane Gustav hit just 2 weeks earlier.

In April 2009, the rebuilding of the island's ranger station, restrooms, visitor center and snack bar washed away by Hurricane Katrina began and was scheduled to be completed in the Fall of 2009. As part of this rehabilitation, parts of Fort Massachusetts damaged by Hurricane Katrina are also being repaired.

In June 2010, containment booms encircled the island in an attempt to protect it from oil leaking from the Deepwater Horizon oil spill.

In early 2019, the US Army Corps of Engineers completed the project to rejoin the two islands, eliminating Camille Cut.

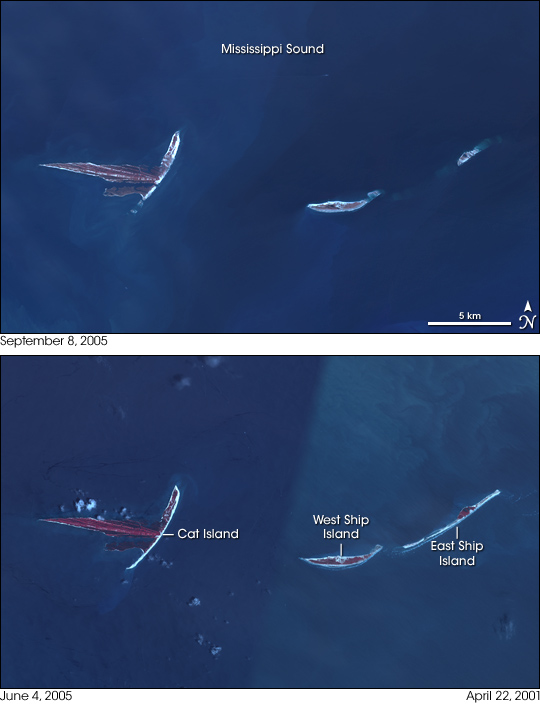
Ship Island (right) before (April 2001, bottom) and after (September 2005, top) Hurricane Katrina.

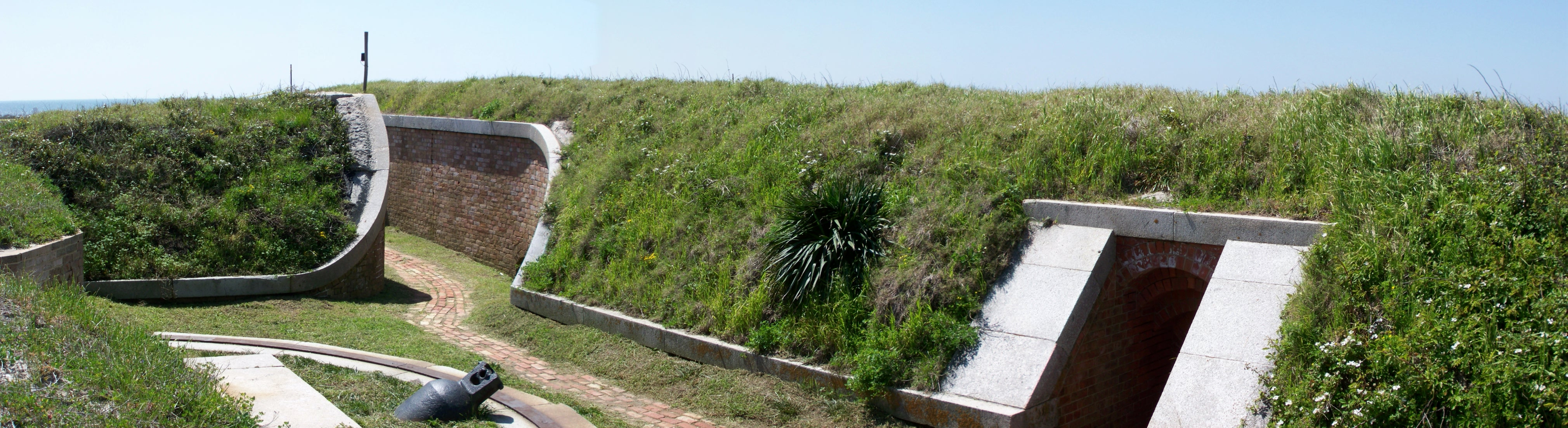
On the top of civil war era Fort Massachusetts on Ship Island.

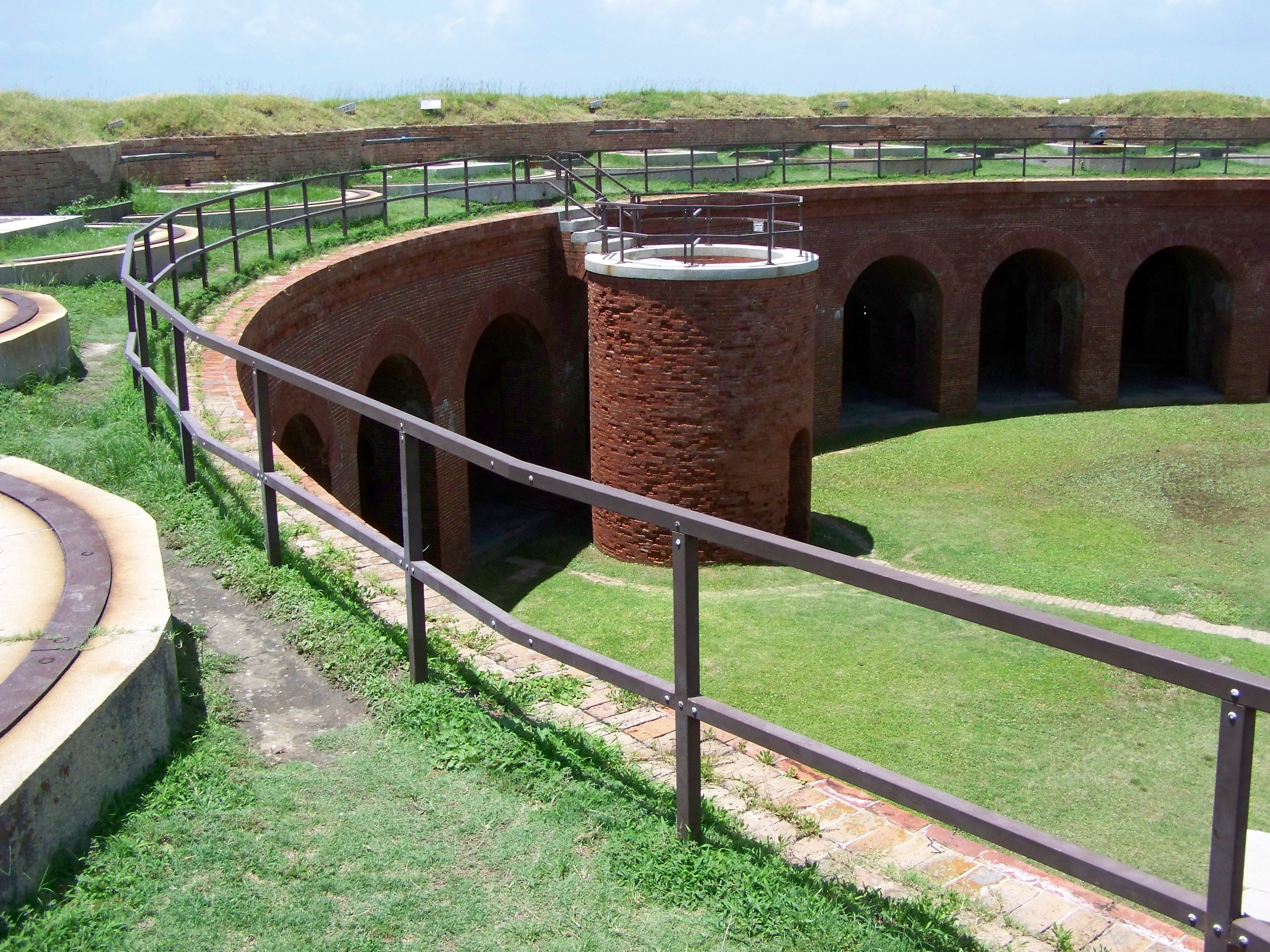
Fort Massachusetts.
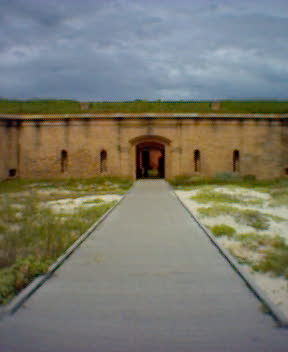
Entrance to Fort Massachusetts.

== Activities ==
Today, Ship Island serves as a tourist destination. Activities include fishing, swimming, and tours of Fort Massachusetts.

== Access ==
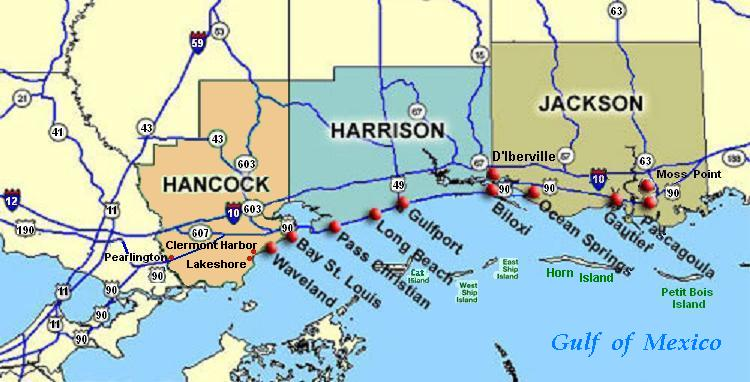
Locations of West Ship Island & East Ship Island (center right), south of Biloxi (right-click to enlarge).

Ship Island is accessible through private or chartered boat. It is also accessible by a privately owned ferry boat company, Ship Island Excursions, running from Gulfport, Mississippi 12 miles (19 km) out to the island for a fee. Ship Island Excursions has been running boats to the island since before the National Park Service acquired the island. Today, they are an official Park Service Concession.
