= Shell Key Preserve =

Barrier island in Pinellas County, Florida

Coordinates: 27°39′44″N 82°44′13″W

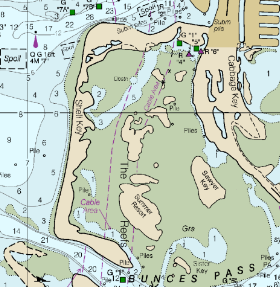
Chart of Shell Key

Shell Key Preserve is an 1,800-acre preserve located on Shell Key in Tierra Verde, Pinellas County in the U.S. state of Florida. The preserve protects sensitive marine habitats and includes one of the county's largest undeveloped barrier islands as well as numerous mangrove islands and expansive sea grass beds.

Shell Key emerged as a barrier island in the early 1960s from a submerged shoal on the north side of Bunces Pass (the island was originally named North Bunces Key). The island extends up to the Pass-a-Grille inlet. The island has grown as swash bars develop off-shore and migrate onto the beach. The island has been breached by storms, but the breaches have closed. The island remains vulnerable to being overwashed by storm surges.

Shell Key has been designated as one of the state's most important areas for shorebird nesting and wintering and it serves as an important study area for these species. It also is an important area for recreation. A balance for both uses was established by restricting public use to the northern and southern ends of the island. A central core area for conservation is closed to the public.

Boating, camping, and beach-going activities are permitted in public use areas of the preserve. Visitors can access Shell Key only via a water vessel and no restroom facilities are provided. The closest boat ramps, trailer parking, and restroom facilities are located at nearby at Fort De Soto Park.
