= Horn Island (Mississippi) =

Island in Jackson County, Mississippi, United States

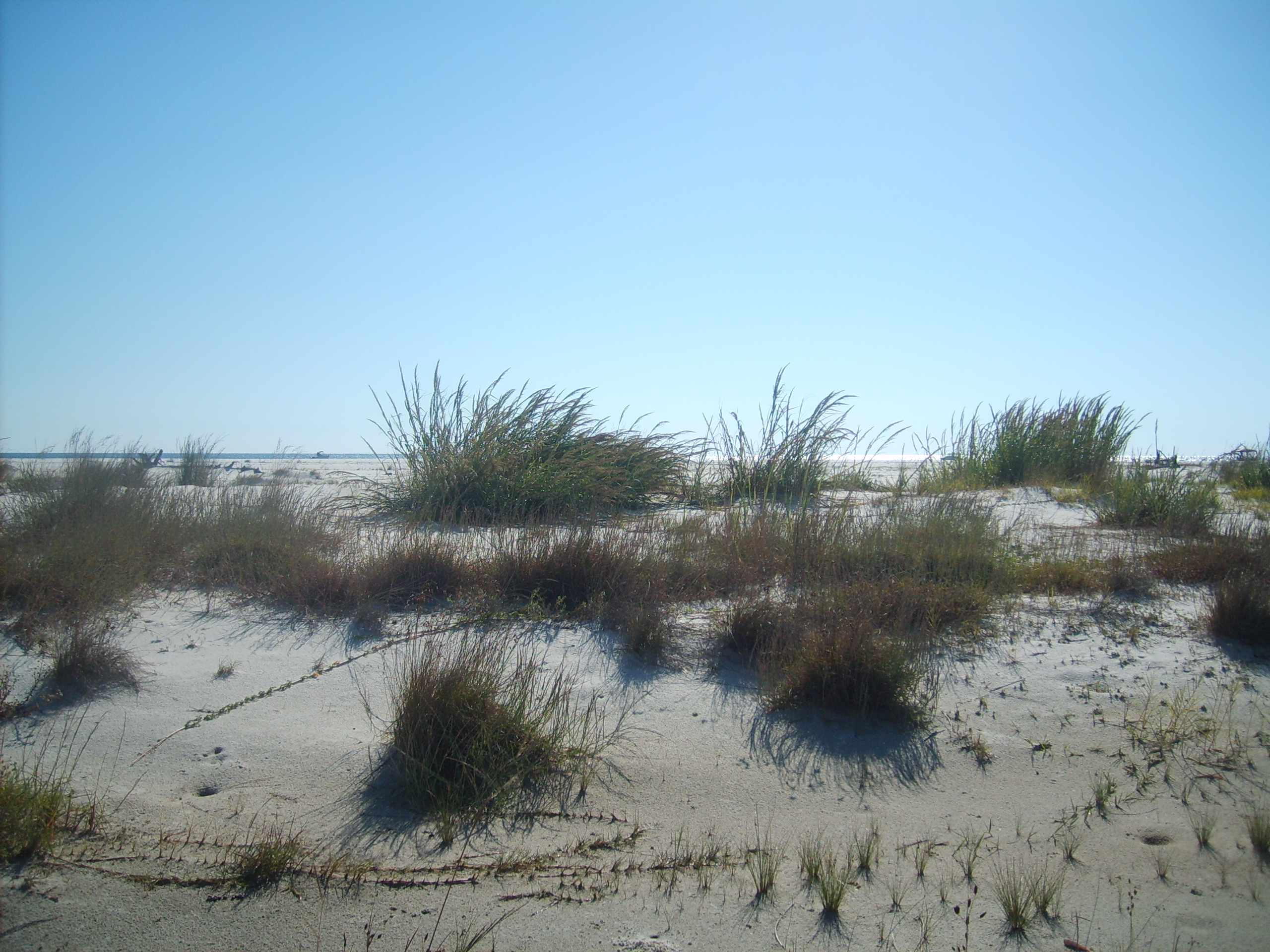
- Beach on south side of Horn Island

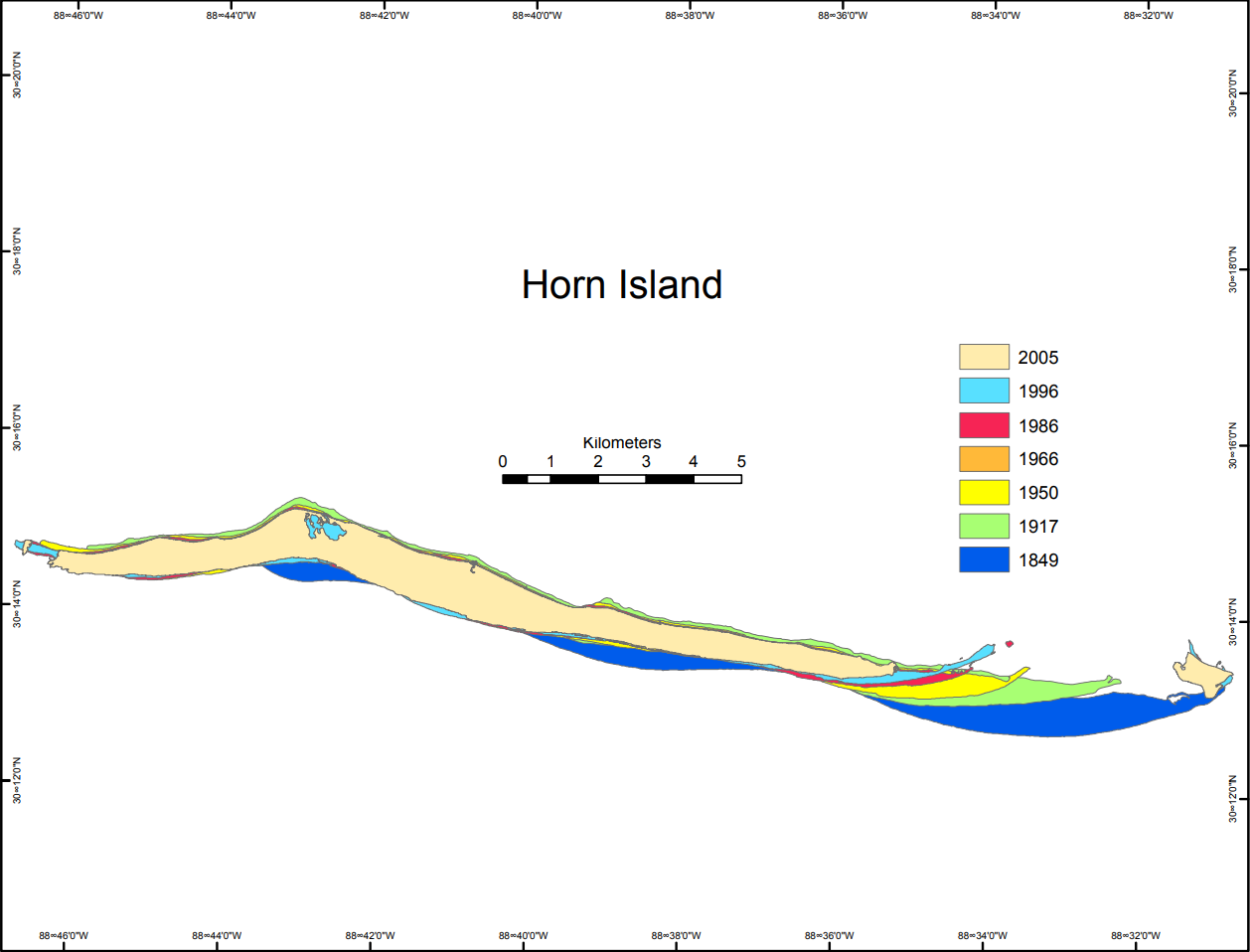
- Historical map of the changing geomorphology of Horn Island

- Location within Mississippi
- Interactive map of Horn Island

Geography
- Location: Gulf of Mexico
- Coordinates: 30°14′N 88°40′W
- Archipelago: Mississippi–Alabama barrier islands

Administration
- United States
- State: Mississippi
- County: Jackson County

Horn Island is a long, thin barrier island off the Mississippi Gulf Coast, south of Ocean Springs, Gautier, and Pascagoula. It is one of the Mississippi–Alabama barrier islands and part of the Gulf Islands National Seashore. Horn Island is several miles long, but less than a mile wide at its widest point. It occupies approximately 4.2 square miles (11 km^{2}).

== Description ==
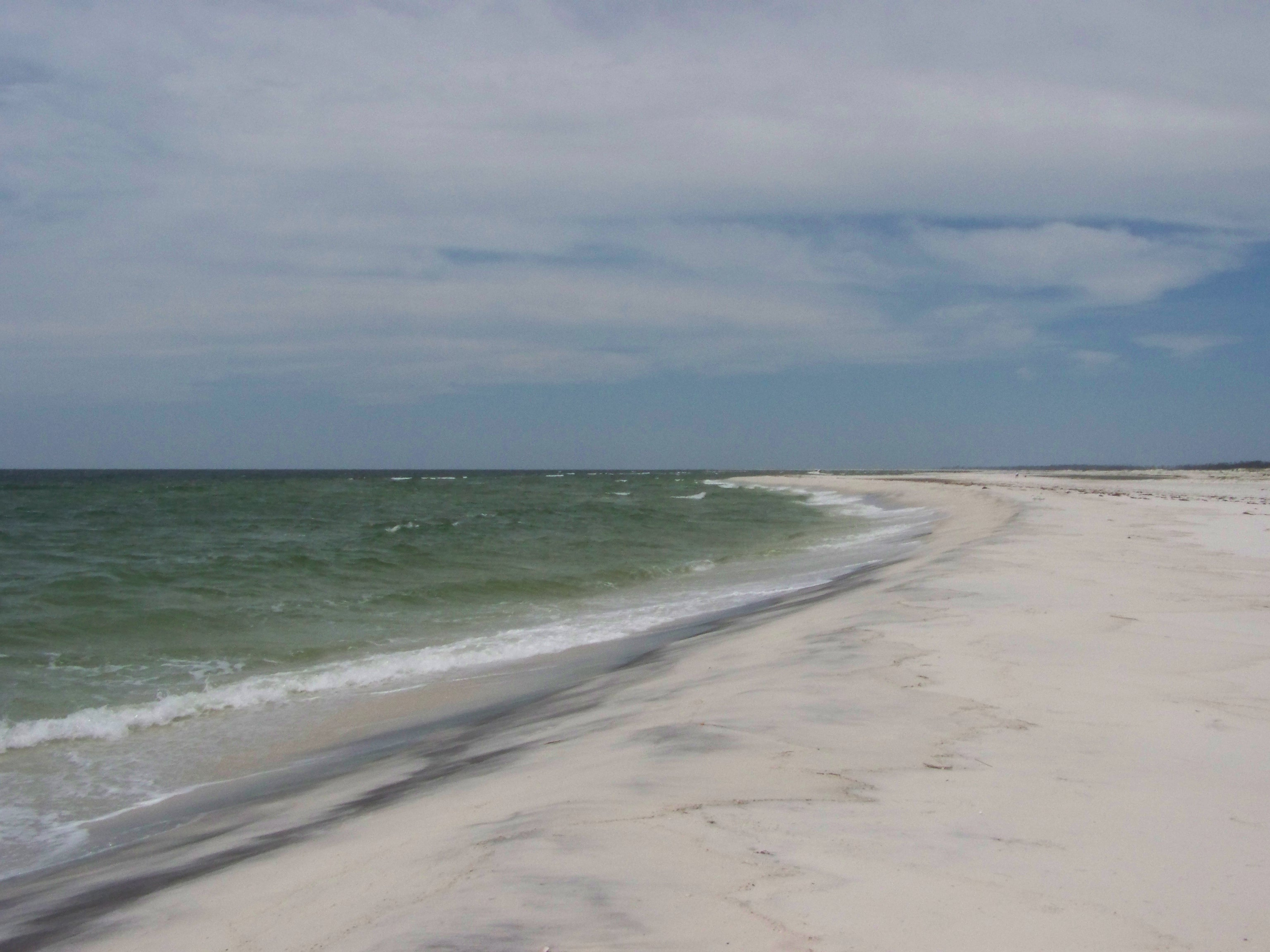
Horn Island beach

The island, in part, shelters and bounds the Mississippi Sound to its north, and has a long beach on the Gulf of Mexico on its south side. The island is undeveloped, except for a small ranger station mid-island. Part of the Gulf Islands National Seashore, it is a favorite boating destination for those living on the Mississippi Gulf Coast.

Horn Island has long stretches of sugar-white sand, dunes punctuated with sea oats, tall pines on small groves, saw palmettos on small groves, and a few inland lagoons. It is home to varied wildlife including alligators, ospreys, pelicans, anhingas, ibises, manatees, ducks, rabbits, raccoons, tern, herons, and other migratory birds. The Sound and the Gulf host innumerable species of sea life.

== History ==
In 1718 Antoine-Simon Le Page du Pratz arrived at Louisiana, and in his book The History of Louisiana he describes the possible etymology of the island's name, and its use as grazing land for livestock.

Horn-island is very flat and tolerably wooded, about six leagues in length, narrowed to a point to the west side. I know not whether it was for this reason, or on account of the number of horned cattle upon it, that it received this name; but it is certain, that the first Canadians, who settled on Isle Dauphine, had put most of their cattle, in great numbers, there; whereby they came to grow rich even when they slept. These cattle not requiring any attendance, or other care, in this island, came to multiply in such a manner, that the owners made great profits of them on our arrival in the colony.

From 1943 to 1945, Horn Island was closed to all public access and activity for use as a biological weapons testing site by the U.S. Army.

From 1946–1965, Walter Inglis Anderson, an artist from Ocean Springs, often visited the island to draw and paint the landscapes and life on the island. Many of his works are on display at the Walter Anderson Museum in Ocean Springs.

In 1989, the island was used as a propagation site for the endangered red wolf as part of the red wolf recovery program. This population was removed in 1998 because of a likelihood of encounters with humans.

On July 4, 2026, Nolan Wells, an 18-year-old college student from Ocean Springs, traveled with friends on a boat to Horn Island for an Independence Day party. Wells did not return to the mainland with his friends and was reported missing later that day. His dead body was discovered near the island two days later. Investigation into his death is ongoing, but authorities do not suspect foul play.

== Nearby islands ==
Horn is one of a chain of Mississippi–Alabama barrier islands. Other islands in the chain include Petit Bois Island and Dauphin Island to the east, and Ship Island and Cat Island to the west. Of the group, Horn Island is the largest.

== See also ==
- Gruinard Island
- Horn Island Testing Station
- Plum Island
