= Dog Key Island =

Island in the Gulf of Mexico

Nickname: Isle of Caprice
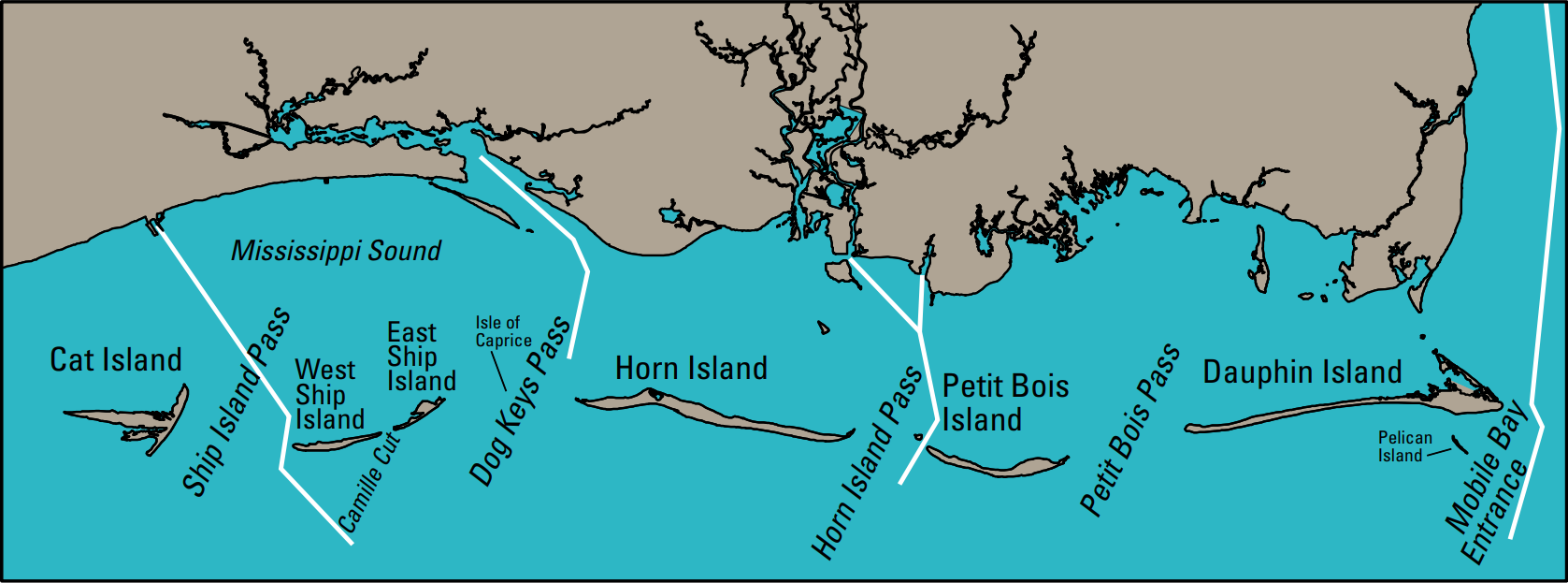
- The Mississippi–Alabama barrier islands and associated tidal inlets in 2007, with the sunken Isle of Caprice marked

- Location within Mississippi

Geography
- Location: Gulf of Mexico
- Coordinates: 30.2415°N 88.8529°W
- Archipelago: Mississippi–Alabama barrier islands

Administration
- United States
- State: Mississippi

Dog Key Island (also known as the Isle of Caprice) is a former barrier island on the Gulf Coast of the United States, between Ship Island and Horn Island among the Mississippi–Alabama barrier islands, and off Biloxi, Mississippi. It has been reported as an island occasionally — in the mid-19th century and the early 20th — while at other times it was submerged. As of 2011 it was a few feet underwater, and NOAA has marked two nautical passes, "Little Dog Keys" and "Dog Keys", next to it.

== History ==
The shoals between Ship Island and Horn Island have intermittently formed small islands known as the Dog Keys, which have been mapped at various dates between 1848 and 1940. Several smaller shoals grew together into one larger island around the beginning of the 20th century, appearing on a 1917 map from the United States Coast and Geodetic Survey. As it stood partly off the territorial waters border of the United States, it was at times used for businesses illegal in Mississippi. Bootleggers used the island and its fresh water during prohibition. More famously, in 1926 three partners opened the Isle of Caprice cabanas hotel, a casino resort where alcoholic drink could be sold openly.

The place was very popular, but after continued natural erosion and a hurricane that diminished the sandy island, in 1932 it was abandoned. It lends its name to the Isle of Capri Casinos chain, the first of which was set in Biloxi. Susan Hunt, a granddaughter of Isle of Caprice owner Walter Henry "Skeet" Hunt, says she keeps the taxes paid on the sunken island just in case luck turns their way again.
