= Isle of Caprice (disambiguation) =

Isle of Caprice may refer to:

- a hotel-casino on Dog Key Island, a barrier island off the coast of Mississippi
- an episode of The Ant and the Aardvark
- Isle of Capri Casinos, a US-based gaming company
