= Petit Bois Island =

Mississippi Gulf Coast barrier island

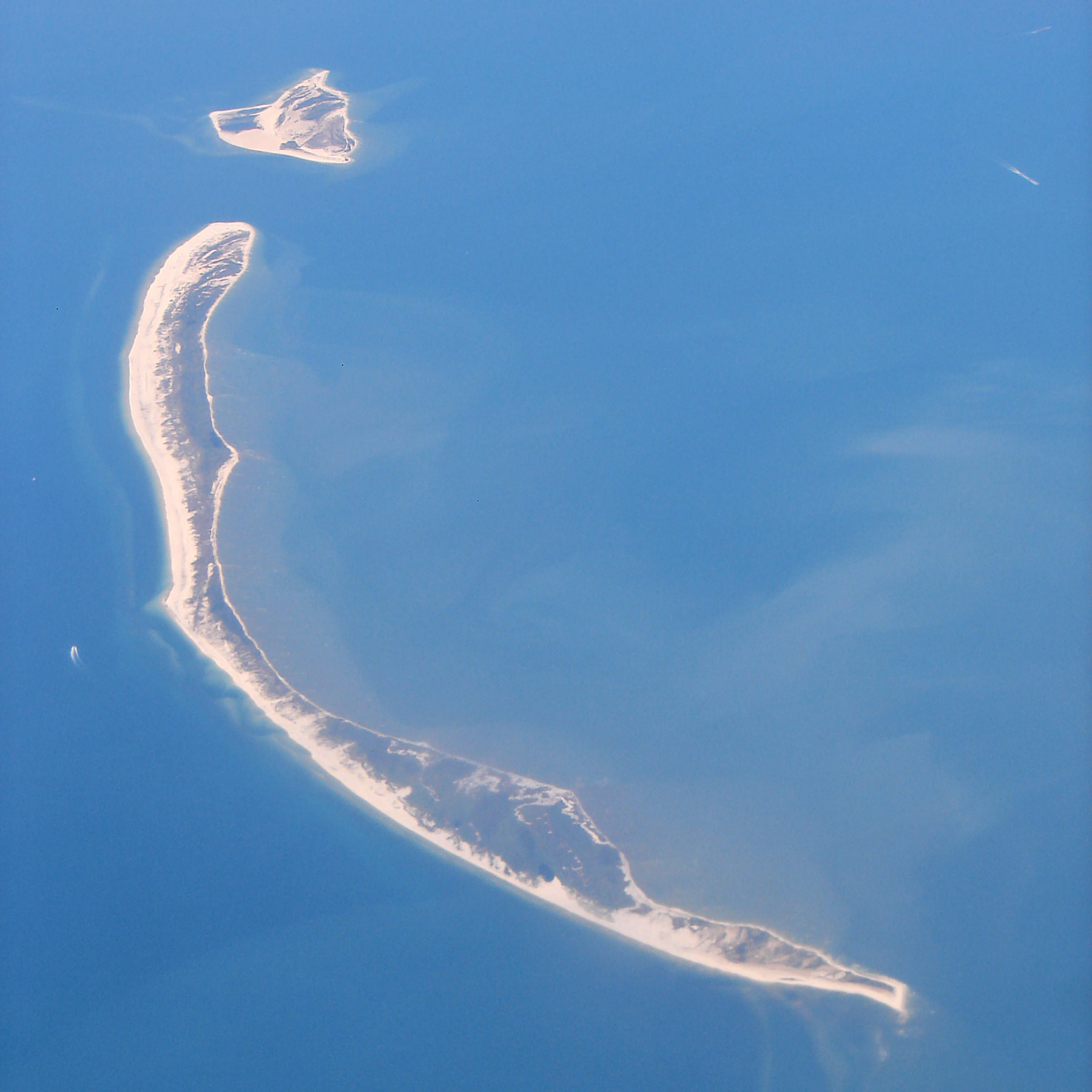
- Aerial view of Petit Bois Island (viewed towards the west; north is to the right)

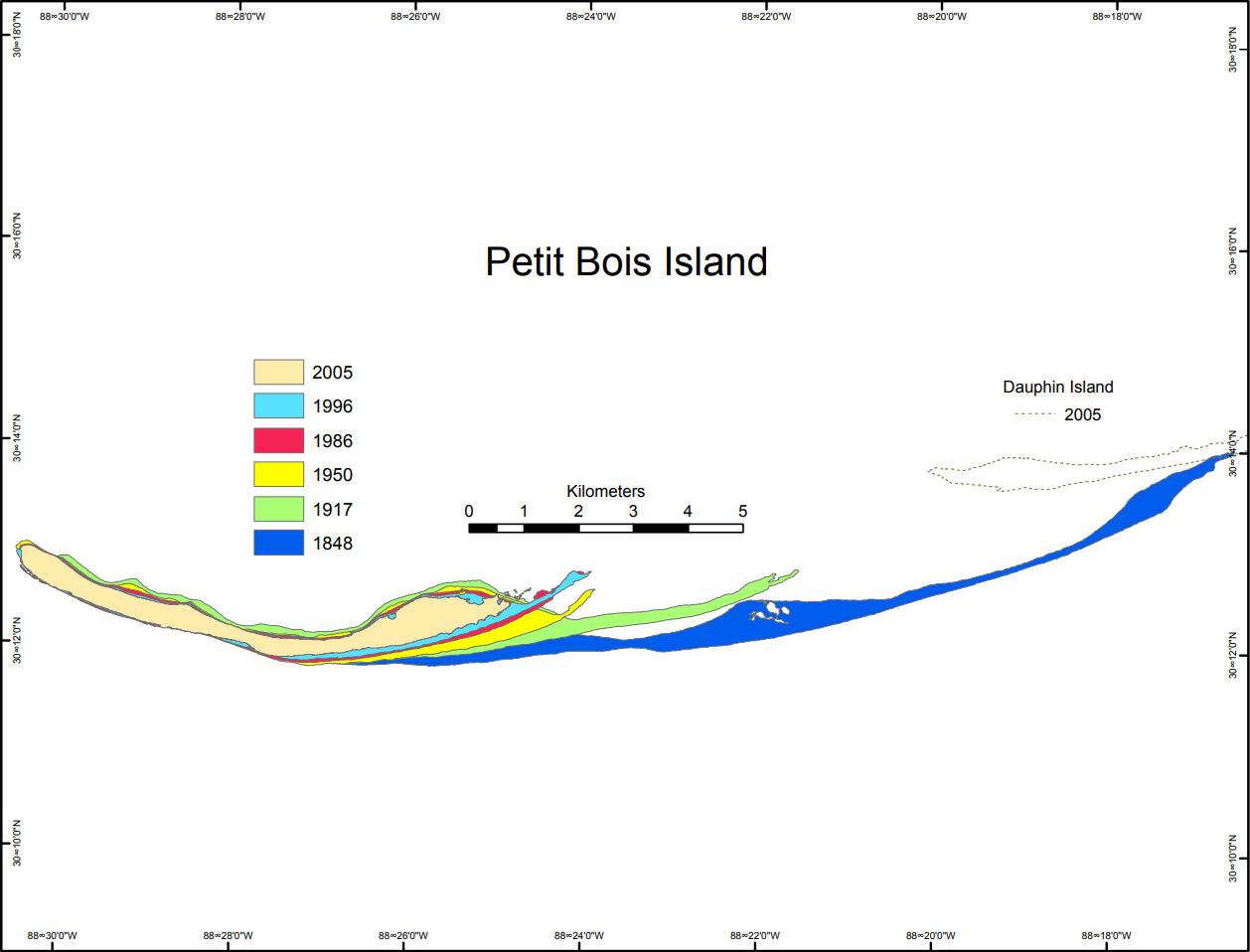
- Historical map of the changing geomorphology of Petit Bois Island

- Location within Mississippi
- Interactive map of Petit Bois Island

Geography
- Location: Gulf of Mexico
- Coordinates: 30°12′N 88°27′W
- Archipelago: Mississippi–Alabama barrier islands

Administration
- United States
- State: Mississippi
- County: Jackson County

Petit Bois Island is a barrier island off the Mississippi Gulf Coast, south of Pascagoula, and one of the Mississippi–Alabama barrier islands. It is part of Jackson County, Mississippi. Since 1971 it has been a part of Gulf Islands National Seashore, administered by the U.S. National Park Service.

According to the United States Geological Survey, variant names are l'Isle de Petit Bois (French, modern spelling would be l'île) and Petitbois Island. Petit bois in French means "little woods". The island was so named by the early French explorers due to a small wooded section located on the eastern end of this mostly sand and scrub-covered island. Following the island's inundation during Hurricane Katrina, most of the trees comprising the little woods section have died.

== Shape changes ==
A French exploration map of 1732 showed an elongated barrier spit between Petit Bois Island and Dauphin Island This connection was breached between 1740 and 1766, possibly as the result of the 1740 hurricane.

Petit Bois originally extended about 7 miles (11 km) east of the Alabama-Mississippi state line and was effectively located in both states. From 1933 to 1968, the eastern end of the island eroded (due to the effects of hurricanes and natural shoreline movement) until it was 1/2 mile (0.8 km) west of the Mississippi state line. The island is approximately 6 miles (9.7 km) long and serves as a habitat for gulls, terns, plovers, and other wildlife.

The United States Army Corps of Engineers dredges sand from the shipping channel, creating a new island named West Petit Bois Island. The National Park Service expects that as the island grows, plants and animals will find their way to the island.

== Massacre Island ==
Early maps suggest that the Petit Bois – rather than current Dauphin Island – may have been the location where a large pile of human skeletons was discovered in 1699, leading to the name Massacre Island.

Petit Bois Island viewed from Mississippi Sound

Dead trees in 'Little Woods' section of Petit Bois Island

== See also ==
- Mississippi Sound
