= Gulf Islands National Seashore =

American seashore along the Gulf of Mexico

- IUCN category V (protected landscape/seascape)
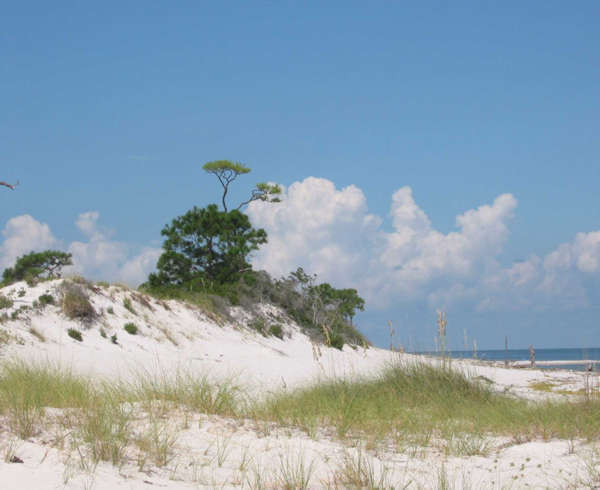
- Gulf Islands National Seashore, near Pensacola

- Location within Florida Location within the United States
- Location: Escambia / Santa Rosa / Okaloosa counties, Florida; Baldwin County and Mobile County, Alabama; and Jackson / Harrison counties, Mississippi; USA
- Nearest city: Mobile, Alabama, Pensacola, FL (Fort Barrancas); Navarre, FL (Santa Rosa Island area); Gulf Breeze, FL (Naval Live Oaks area); Destin, FL (Okaloosa Island area); Pascagoula, MS (Mississippi area)
- Coordinates: 30°21′52″N 86°58′3″W
- Area: 135,457.89 acres (548.1786 km^{2}); 99,083.64 acres (40,097.73 ha) federal
- Established: January 8, 1971
- Visitors: 8,277,857 (in 2023)
- Governing body: U.S. National Park Service
- Website: Gulf Islands National Seashore

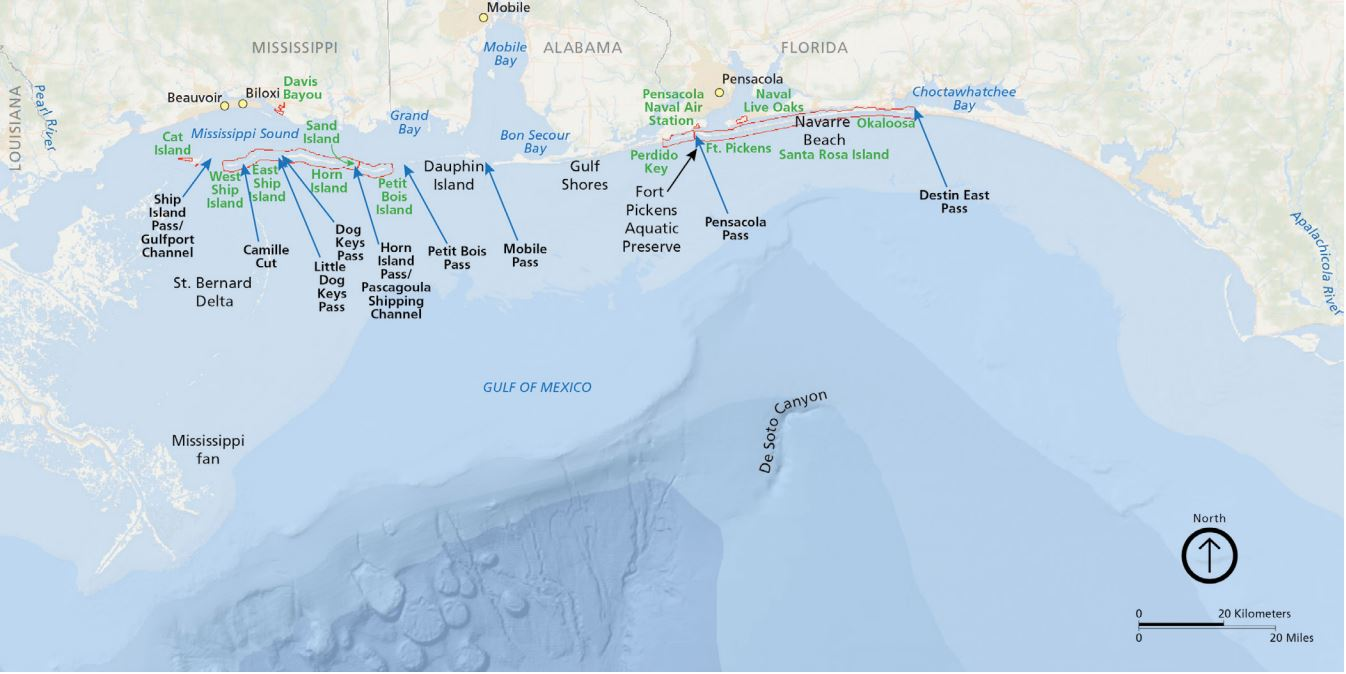
Gulf Islands National Seashore map

Gulf Islands National Seashore is an American national seashore that offers recreation opportunities and preserves natural and historic resources along the Gulf of Mexico barrier islands of Florida, Alabama, and Mississippi. In 2024, it was the sixth-most visited unit of the National Park Service.

The protected regions include mainland areas and parts of seven islands. Some islands along the Alabama coast were originally considered for inclusion, but none are part of the National Seashore.

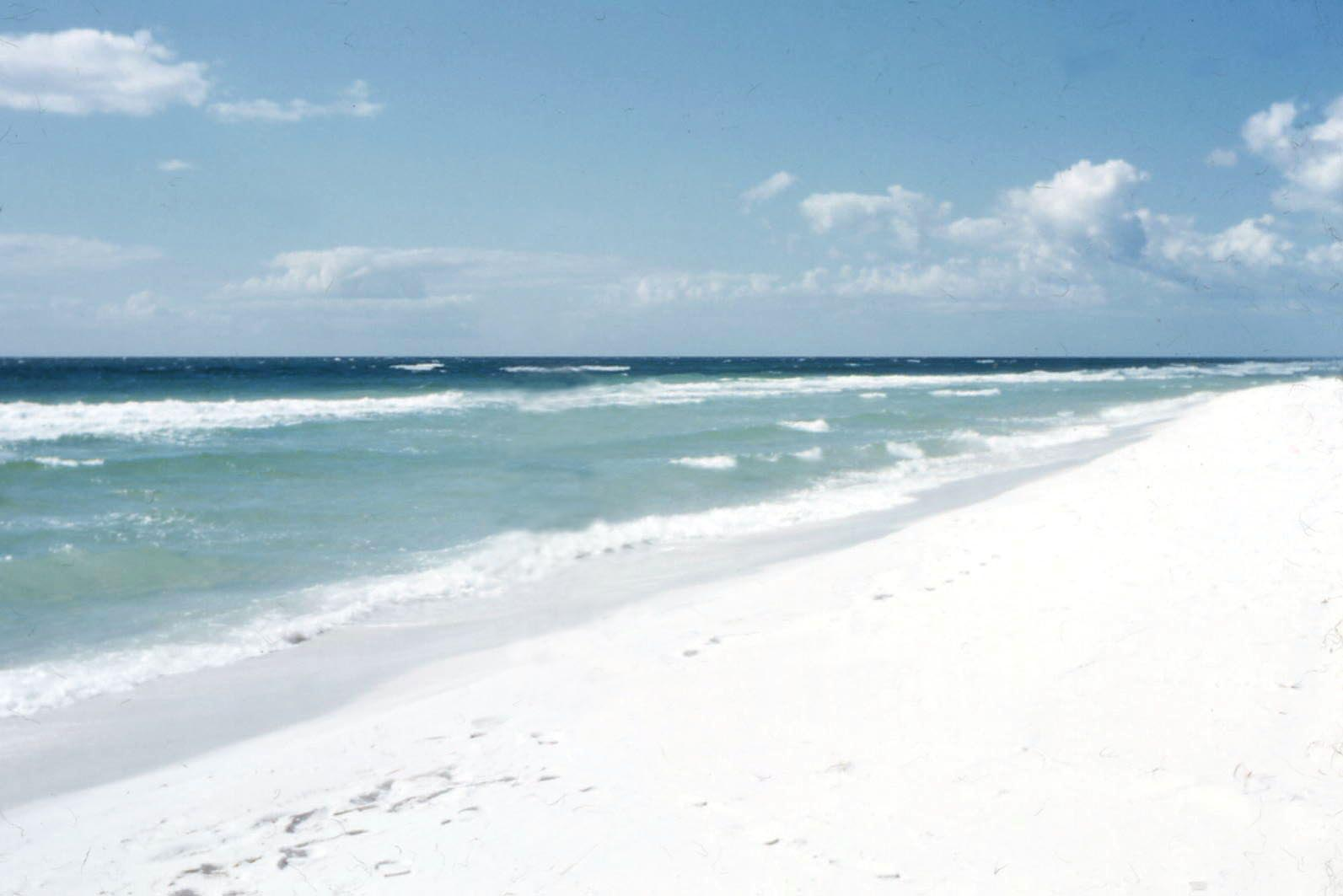
The color of the sand in the region is exceptionally white, as seen in this 1957 photo at Pensacola Beach, Florida, adjacent to the protected area designated in 1971.

The Florida District of the seashore features offshore barrier islands with sparkling white quartz sand beaches (along miles of undeveloped land), historic fortifications, and nature trails. The Perdido Key Historic District preserves shore batteries active in World War I and World War II. Mainland features near Pensacola, Florida, include the Naval Live Oaks Reservation, beaches, and military forts. All Florida areas are accessible by automobile.

The Mississippi District of the seashore features natural beaches, historic sites, wildlife sanctuaries, islands accessible only by boat, bayous, nature trails, picnic areas, and campgrounds. The Davis Bayou Area is the only portion of the National Seashore in Mississippi that is accessible by automobile. Petit Bois, Horn, East Ship, West Ship, and Cat islands are accessible only by boat. The 4,080 acres (16.5 km^{2}) Gulf Islands Wilderness offers special protection within the seashore to parts of Petit Bois Island and Horn Island, Mississippi.

Considerable damage to public infrastructure occurred as a result of storms during the 2004 and 2005 Atlantic hurricane seasons. In subsequent years, infrastructure was fully repaired. All roadways, parking areas, campgrounds, and visitor centers have been repaired and are fully operational. A few trails and associated boardwalks and dune crossovers were still under repair as of late 2010, especially near the Fort Pickens campground.

Hurricane Sally hit the area in September 2020 causing massive damage to the Gulf Islands Seashores. Perdido Key was hit with flooding waters that flattened out some of the dunes along Perdido Key. Johnson Beach National Seashore, part of the Gulf Islands National Seashore at the east end of the island, was hit particularly hard. Many of the dunes were flattened and the end of the island was gorged forming 3 small isolated islands off the tip. Restoration projects bring in sand and vegetation to restore storm damage, though it can be a long process with subsequent storms and strong winds.

Entrance fees are charged at the entrance to the Fort Pickens area at Pensacola Beach, as well as the Johnson Beach Area at Perdido Key in Florida. The typical automobile entrance fee is US$25, good for seven days. Annual passes can be purchased for US$45.

== Islands ==
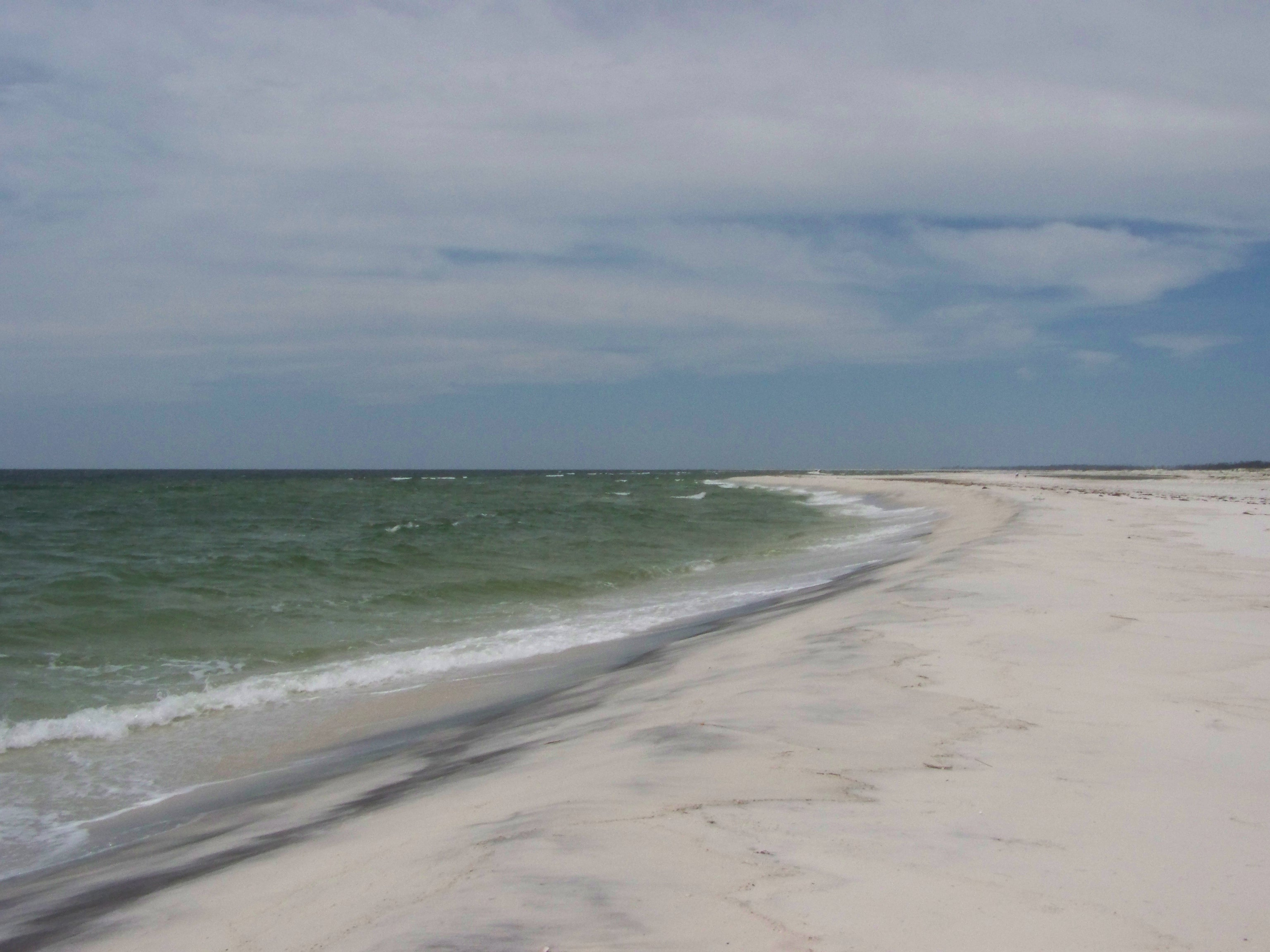
Horn Island (in Mississippi).

Principal islands in the seashore (from east to west):

- Santa Rosa Island - Florida
- Perdido Key - Florida
- Petit Bois Island - Mississippi
- West Petit Bois Island (formerly known as Sand Island) - Mississippi
- Horn Island - Mississippi
- East Ship Island - Mississippi
- West Ship Island - Mississippi
- Cat Island - Mississippi

== History ==
The national seashore was authorized on January 8, 1971, and is administered by the National Park Service. The wilderness area was designated on November 10, 1978. Santa Rosa Island had been previously protected as a national monument from 1939 to 1946.

The Deepwater Horizon oil spill, beginning on April 20, 2010, released masses of oil and tar which began washing ashore, in varying amounts, along the Gulf Islands National Seashore on June 1, 2010. On June 23, 2010, wave after wave of oil pools and globs began covering the beaches on Santa Rosa Island, resulting in a fishing and swimming ban. The oil-spill disaster affected every large island in the group.

== Day use areas ==
There are 6 distinct areas of the seashore in Florida for visitors:

- Johnson Beach area on Perdido Key
- Fort Barrancas area on the Naval Air Station in Pensacola
- Fort Pickens area on East Pensacola Beach
- Gulf Breeze area on Gulf Breeze
- Santa Rosa Island area on West Pensacola Beach
- Okaloosa Island area on Fort Walton Beach

== Visitor centers ==
Four visitor centers, staffed by National Park personnel, are located within Gulf Islands National Seashore. Two are located in Florida, and one is located in Mississippi.

Florida Visitor Centers

- Fort Barrancas Visitor Center (located aboard Naval Air Station Pensacola, Florida)
- Fort Pickens Discovery Center, Pensacola Beach, Florida

Mississippi Visitor Centers

- William M. Colmer Visitor Center (Davis Bayou Area), Ocean Springs, Mississippi
  - Near Fort Massachusetts

== Camping ==
Two developed campgrounds are located in the National Seashore. Primitive camping is also permitted in designated areas.

In Florida, the Pickens Campground is a developed one and provides water and electrical hookups for recreational vehicles and tents. Roads are paved throughout the campground, as well as each campsite. The environment is characterized by sand scrub oaks, small brackish ponds, and a remnant pine forest on a barrier island between Pensacola Bay and the Gulf of Mexico. Central restrooms and showers are available. A campground store reopened in late 2010 (after being closed following storm damage from Hurricanes Ivan and Dennis in 2004 and 2005, respectively). There are no sewer hookups at the campsites; however, a dump station is available. The campground is located approximately 1.5 miles (2.4 km) from Fort Pickens itself.

In Mississippi, the Davis Bayou Campground is developed, providing water and electrical hookups for recreational vehicles and tents. Roads are paved throughout the campground, as well as each campsite. The environment is characterized by an oak and pine forest adjacent to a brackish bayou connected to Mississippi Sound. Central restrooms and showers are available. There are no sewer hookups at the campsites; however, a dump station is available. The campground is located at the end of roadway leading through the Davis Bayou Area.

Primitive camping is permitted on several of the barrier islands. Boating or hiking in is required. Such camping is allowed on Perdido Key, Florida (east of Johnson Beach), and on government-owned properties on Petit Bois, Horn, East Ship, and Cat islands in Mississippi.

== Geology ==
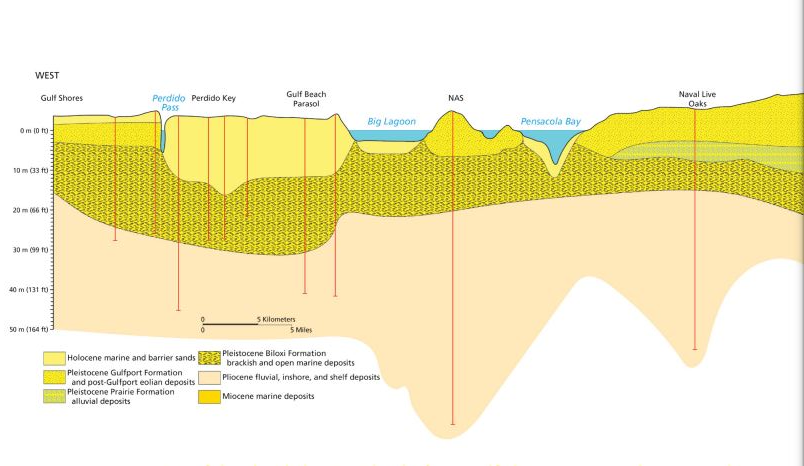
Gulf Islands National Seashore geologic cross section

The barrier islands started forming 4500–5400 years ago. On the north side of the islands, the beaches are broad, while on the south side, the beaches include 2 metres (6.6 ft) high dunes on average, but with some reaching 6 metres (20 ft). The white quartz sands originated from the Appalachian Mountains. The surface geology consists mainly of Holocene marine, beach and dune sands. On Santa Rosa Island, these lie unconformably on Pleistocene formations deposited during the Sangamonian Marine Isotope Stage 5, when the sea level was 3–6 meters (9.8–19.7 feet) above the present level. This includes the Gulfport Formation, a barrier complex with shallow nearshore, beach and dune sands, the Prairie Formation, deposited in nearshore marine and estuarine-lagoonal brackish environments, and the Biloxi Formation, consisting of floodplain alluvial deposits. Below these formations are the Pliocene Pensacola Clay, the Oligocene Tampa Member of the Arcadia Formation, and the Oligocene Chickasawhay Limestone. On Horn Island, the Holocene deposits overlay Miocene formations that includes the Pascagoula Formation, consisting of fluvial, estuarine, and nearshore marine (undifferentiated) deposits, the Hattiesburg Formation, consisting of fluvial, estuarine, and nearshore marine (undifferentiated) deposits, and the Catahoula Formation.

== Climate ==
Gulf Islands National Seashore

Climate chart (precipitation, max. and min. temperature)
J	F	M	A	M	J	J	A	S	O	N	D
3.2 55 52	9 55 48	5.2 66 59	9 73 68	4.7 81 72	7.4 81 75	12 81 77	7.8 82 75	6.9 81 75	2.8 73 66	3.3 66 63	5.4 63 57
- █ Average max. and min. temperatures in °F
- █ Precipitation totals in inches
Metric conversion
J	F	M	A	M	J	J	A	S	O	N	D
81 13 11	229 13 9	132 19 15	229 23 20	119 27 22	188 27 24	305 27 25	198 28 24	175 27 24	71 23 19	84 19 17	137 17 14
- █ Average max. and min. temperatures in °C
- █ Precipitation totals in mm

== See also ==
- List of U.S. Wilderness Areas
- Hispanic Heritage Sites (U.S. National Park Service)

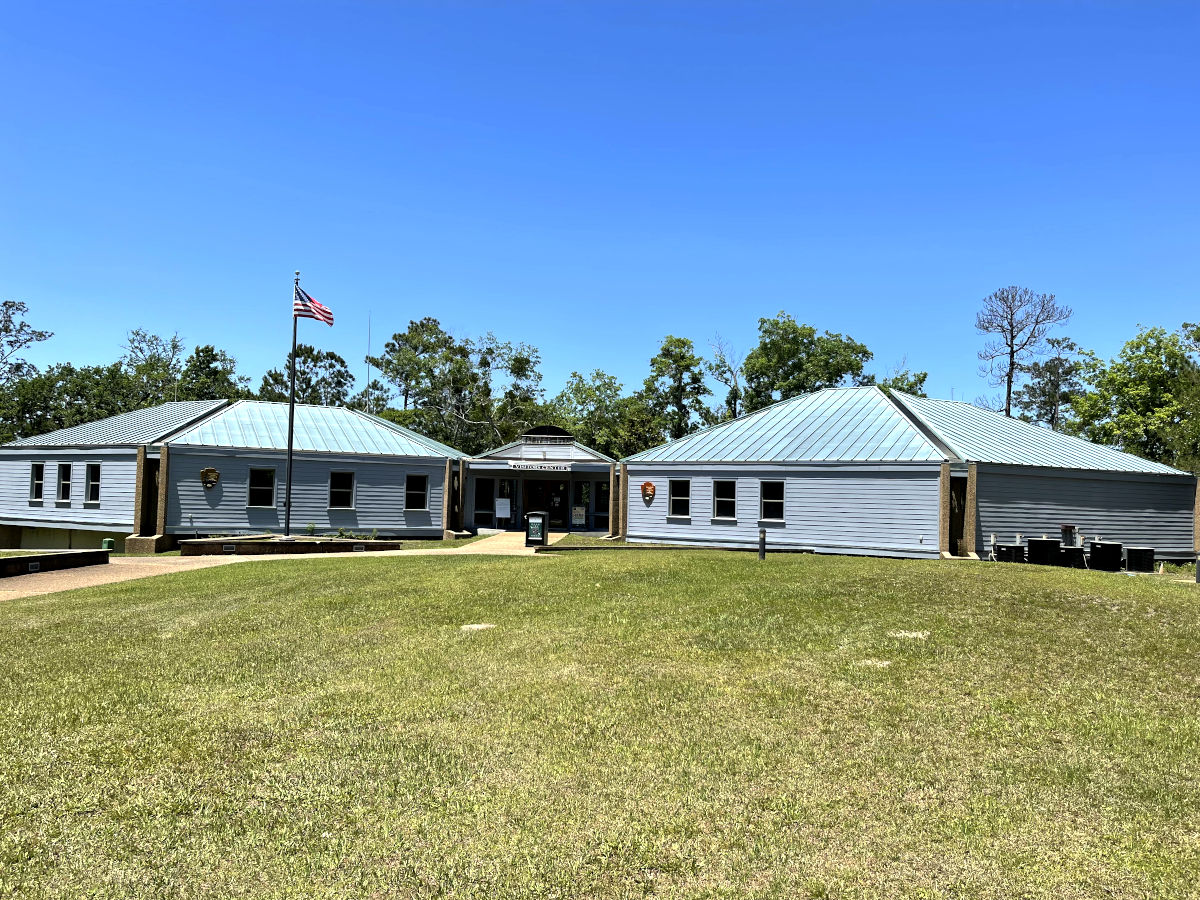
Davis Bayou Area Visitor Center
