= Cat Island (Mississippi) =

US Gulf Coast barrier island

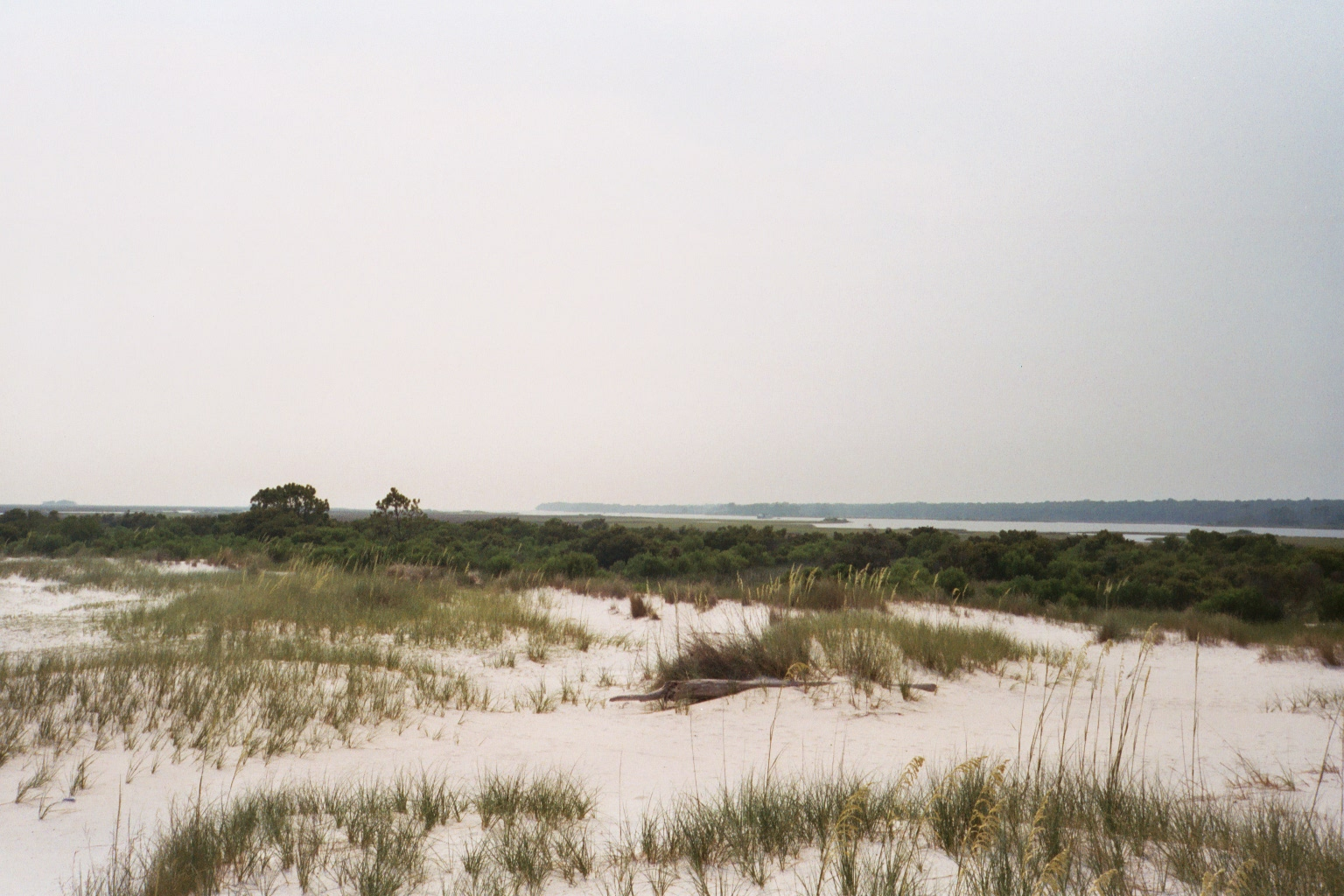
- Dunes on the south side of Cat Island

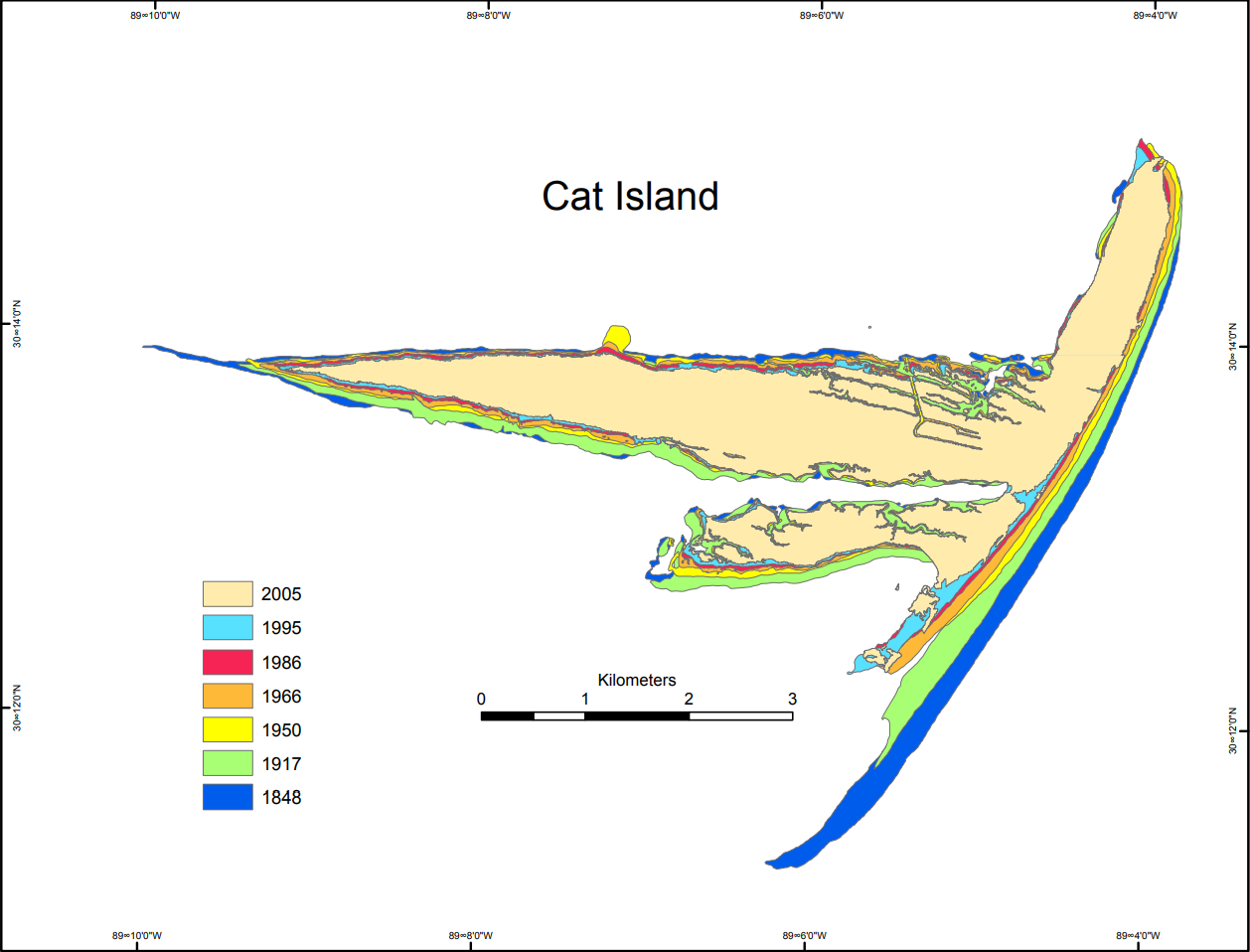
- Historical map of the changing geomorphology of Cat Island

- Location within Mississippi

Geography
- Location: Gulf of Mexico
- Coordinates: 30°13′N 89°06′W
- Archipelago: Mississippi–Alabama barrier islands

Administration
- United States
- State: Mississippi
- County: Harrison County

Cat Island is a barrier island off the Gulf Coast of the United States, located in the state of Mississippi, and is one of the Mississippi–Alabama barrier islands. The island's name comes from French explorers who mistook raccoons (which were not introduced to Europe until the 20th century) for cats. It is unknown who discovered Cat Island. It is within the jurisdiction of Harrison County, Mississippi. The western half and southern tip of the island is part of the Gulf Islands National Seashore.

== Formation and history ==
Cat Island is a unique "T-shaped" island created by colliding Gulf of Mexico currents. Unlike the other Mississippi islands, Cat Island's sand beaches are backed by dense forests of slash pines and live oaks. Due to the dredging of the Gulfport ship channel, however, Cat Island has lost its natural westward flow of sediment which provided material for the island to combat erosion. Bayous and marshes on Cat Island are home to alligators and refuge to migratory birds.

The island became a home to multiple settlers during the 18th century. The first settler to acquire a land grant was Nicolas Christian Ladner. The island was sold in 1837 by Ladner's son-in-law.

During World War II, the island was base for the Cat Island War Dog Reception and Training Center where Americans sent family dogs to be trained by the U.S. Army Signal Corps for military service. The dogs were trained to sniff out Japanese Americans because of the belief that those of Japanese ethnicity had a distinct odor. This particular experiment was totally unsuccessful though dogs proved effective as an aid to sentries and advance scouts. This period of the island's history was featured on a June 2009 episode of the PBS series History Detectives.

The western half and southern tip of the island became part of the Gulf Islands National Seashore in 2002. The remainder of the island, including most of the beach, is still privately owned. The eastern beach is owned by BP, who purchased it in April 2011 to use in assisting cleanup of the 2010 Deepwater Horizon oil spill. In December 2016 Mississippi acquired the 492 acres that BP had purchased from the Boddie family in 2011. This section of East Beach was added to the Cat Island Coastal Preserve.

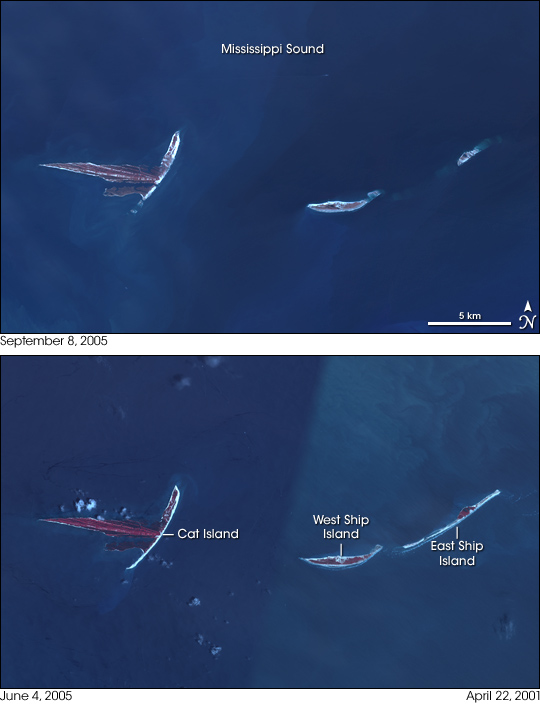
Cat Island (left) before (June 2004, bottom) and after (September 2005, top) Hurricane Katrina.

In 2005 Hurricane Katrina shrank the island by eliminating the southern tip. The hurricane destroyed every home located on the island. During the foul weather associated with Hurricane Patricia a commercial fisherman reported abundant redfish in the flooded bayous of the island.

== See also ==
- Mississippi Sound
