= Barrier island =

Coastal dune landform

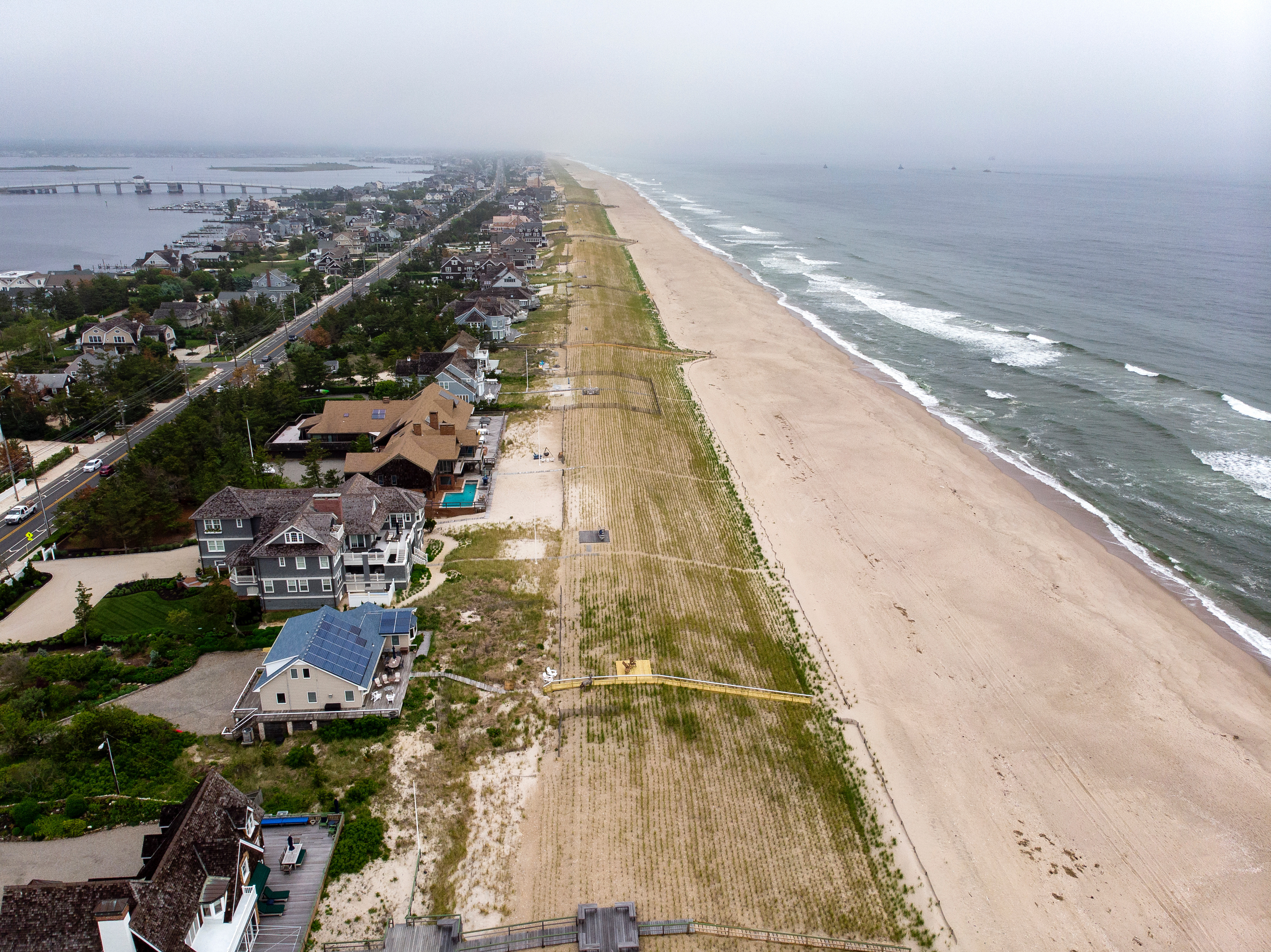
Mantoloking, New Jersey rests on the barrier island of Barnegat Bay. Note how the barrier island shields the inland Barnegat Bay (left) from the more powerful wave action of the open Atlantic Ocean (right).

Barrier island contrasted with other coastal landforms

Barrier islands are a coastal landform, a type of dune system and sand island, where an area of sand off the coast has been formed by wave and tidal action parallel to the mainland coast. Barrier islands are commonly formed in long, narrow systems parallel to shorelines and are shaped by waves, tides, sediment movement, and sea-level change, which cause them to shift, grow, or erode over time. They protect coastlines by absorbing energy, and create areas of protected waters where wetlands may flourish. A barrier chain may extend for hundreds of kilometers, with islands periodically separated by tidal inlets. The longest barrier island in the world is Padre Island of Texas, United States, at 113 miles (182 km) long. Sometimes an important inlet may close permanently, transforming an island into a barrier peninsula, often including a barrier beach. Barrier islands are related to other coastal landforms such as barrier beaches and spits, which share similar physical features but differ primarily in their degree of attachment to the mainland and the presence of water on their landward side. Though many are long and narrow, the length and width of barriers and overall morphology of barrier coasts are related to parameters including tidal range, wave energy, sediment supply, sea-level trends, and basement controls. The amount of vegetation on the barrier has a large impact on the height and evolution of the island.

Globally, there have been approximately 1,500 barrier islands identified, totaling over 15,000 kilometers in combined length. Barrier islands are most abundant in the northern hemisphere with North America accounting for over one-third of the barrier islands and Asia nearing one-quarter of the total.

There are chains of barrier islands along approximately 13 to 15% of the world's coastlines. They display different settings, suggesting that they can form and be maintained in a variety of environments. Numerous theories have been proposed to explain their formation.

A human-made offshore coastal engineering structure constructed parallel to the shore is called a breakwater. Its coastal morphodynamic effect is to dissipate and reduce the energy of the waves and currents striking the coast in the same way as a naturally occurring barrier island.

== Constituent parts ==
Barrier islands function as part of an interconnected coastal system where environments exchange both sediment and energy, where changes to one component can influence the entire barrier system.

Upper shoreface

The shoreface is the part of the barrier where the ocean reaches the shore of the island. The barrier island body itself separates the shoreface from the backshore and lagoon/tidal flat area. Characteristics common to the upper shoreface are fine sands with mud and possibly silt. Further out into the ocean the sediment becomes finer. The effect of waves at this point is weak because of the depth. Bioturbation is common and many fossils can be found in upper shoreface deposits in the geologic record.

Middle shoreface

The middle shoreface is located in the upper shoreface. The middle shoreface is strongly influenced by wave movement because of its depth. Closer to shore the sand is medium-grained, with shell pieces common. Since wave action is heavier, bioturbation is not likely.

Lower shoreface

The lower shoreface is constantly affected by wave action. This results in development of herringbone sedimentary structures because of the constant differing flow of waves. The sand is coarser.

Foreshore

The foreshore is the area on land between high and low tide. Like the upper shoreface, it is constantly affected by wave action. Cross-bedding and lamination are present and coarser sands are present because of the high energy present by the crashing of the waves. The sand is also very well sorted.

Backshore

The backshore is always above the highest water level point. The berm is also found here which marks the boundary between the foreshore and backshore. Wind is the important factor here, not water. During strong storms high waves and wind can deliver and erode sediment from the backshore.

Dunes

Coastal dunes, created by wind, are typical of a barrier island. They are located at the top of the backshore. The dunes will display characteristics of typical aeolian wind-blown dunes. The difference is that dunes on a barrier island typically contain coastal vegetation roots and marine bioturbation. They also help Barrier Islands grow.

Lagoon and tidal flats

The lagoon and tidal flat area is located behind the dune and backshore area. Here the water is still, which allows fine silts, sands, and mud to settle out. Lagoons can become host to an anaerobic environment. This will allow high amounts of organic-rich mud to form. Vegetation is also common.

== Processes ==
=== Migration and overwash ===
Water levels may be higher than the island during storm events. This situation can lead to overwash, which brings sand from the front of the island to the top and/or landward side of the island. During these washover events, the sand that is being transported may end up on the landward side, beyond the dune, forming a washover fan. The overwash can continuously alter the surface of the barrier, requiring the ecosystem to adapt to periodic disturbances. This process leads to the evolution and migration of the barrier island.

==== Types of migration ====
Barrier island systems are dynamic and they may shift positions over time through three main types of migration. Lateral migration happens when sand is pushed along the coast, causing erosion at one end and accumulations at the other. This results in sideways movement along the shoreline. Prograding/regressive migration is when sand builds up on the ocean-facing side of the barrier island, leading to growth on the seaward side. Transgression migration occurs when the barrier island is being built up toward the mainland. This is commonly caused by the sea levels rising or the land sinking.

=== Critical width concept ===
Barrier islands are often formed to have a certain width. The term "critical width concept" has been discussed with reference to barrier islands, overwash, and washover deposits since the 1970s. The concept basically states that overwash processes were effective in migration of the barrier only where the barrier width is less than a critical value. The island did not narrow below these values because overwash was effective at transporting sediment over the barrier island, thereby keeping pace with the rate of ocean shoreline recession. Sections of the island with greater widths experienced washover deposits that did not reach the bayshore, and the island narrowed by ocean shoreline recession until it reached the critical width. The only process that widened the barrier beyond the critical width was breaching, formation of a partially subaerial flood shoal, and subsequent inlet closure.

Critical barrier width can be defined as the smallest cross-shore dimension that minimizes net loss of sediment from the barrier island over the defined project lifetime. The magnitude of critical width is related to sources and sinks of sand in the system, such as the volume stored in the dunes and the net long-shore and cross-shore sand transport, as well as the island elevation. The concept of critical width is important for large-scale barrier island restoration, in which islands are reconstructed to optimum height, width, and length for providing protection for estuaries, bays, marshes and mainland beaches.

== Location ==
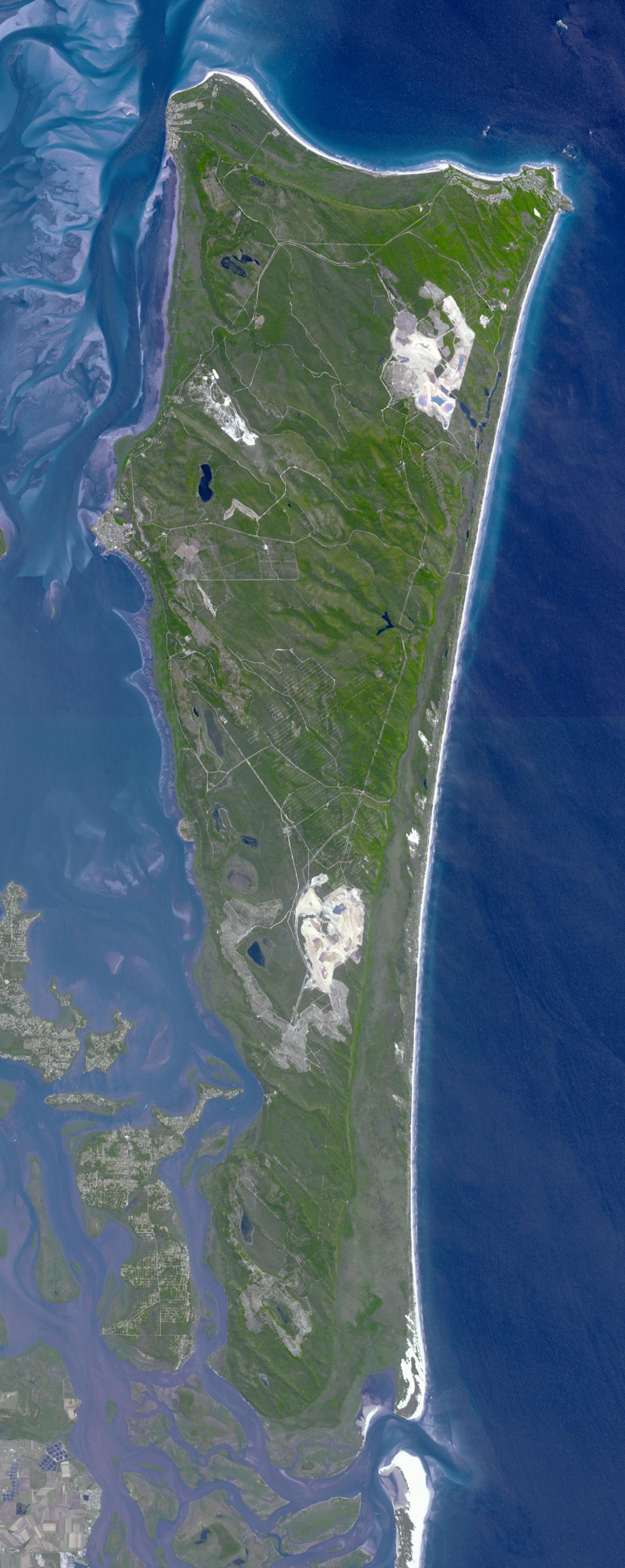
Satellite image of North Stradbroke Island, a barrier island in Queensland, Australia.

Barrier islands can be observed on every continent on Earth, except Antarctica. They occur primarily in areas that are tectonically stable, such as "trailing edge coasts" facing (moving away from) ocean ridges formed by divergent boundaries of tectonic plates, and around smaller marine basins such as the Mediterranean Sea and the Gulf of Mexico. Areas with relatively small tides and ample sand supply favor barrier island formation.

=== Australia ===
Moreton Bay, on the east coast of Australia and directly east of Brisbane, is sheltered from the Pacific Ocean by a chain of very large barrier islands. Running north to south they are Bribie Island, Moreton Island, North Stradbroke Island and South Stradbroke Island (the last two used to be a single island until a storm created a channel between them in 1896). North Stradbroke Island is the second largest sand island in the world and Moreton Island is the third largest.

K'gari (formerly known as Fraser Island), another barrier island lying 200 km north of Moreton Bay on the same coastline, is the largest sand island in the world.

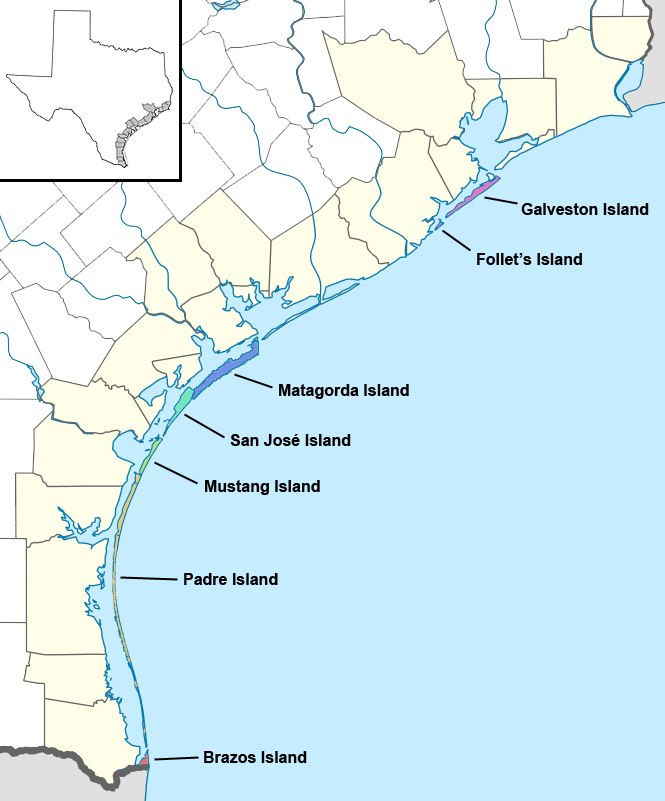
Map of barrier islands along the Texas Gulf Coast.

=== United States ===
Barrier islands are found most prominently on the United States' East and Gulf Coasts, where every state, from Maine to Florida (East Coast) and from Florida to Texas (Gulf coast), features at least part of a barrier island. Many have large numbers of barrier islands; Florida, for instance, had 29 (in 1997) in just 300 kilometres (190 mi) along the west (Gulf) coast of the Florida peninsula, plus about 20 others on the east coast and several barrier islands and spits along the panhandle coast. Padre Island, in Texas, is the world's longest barrier island; other well-known islands on the Gulf Coast include Galveston Island in Texas and Sanibel and Captiva Islands in Florida. Those on the East Coast include Miami Beach and Palm Beach in Florida; Hatteras Island in North Carolina; Assateague Island in Virginia and Maryland; Absecon Island in New Jersey, where Atlantic City is located; and Jones Beach Island and Fire Island, both off Long Island in New York. No barrier islands are found on the Pacific Coast of the United States due to the rocky shore and short continental shelf, but barrier peninsulas can be found. Barrier islands can also be seen on Alaska's Arctic coast.

=== Canada ===
Barrier Islands can also be found in Maritime Canada, and other places along the coast. A good example is found at Miramichi Bay, New Brunswick, where Portage Island as well as Fox Island and Hay Island protect the inner bay from storms in the Gulf of Saint Lawrence.

=== Mexico ===
Mexico's Gulf of Mexico coast has numerous barrier islands and barrier peninsulas.

=== New Zealand ===
Barrier islands are more prevalent in the north of both of New Zealand's main islands. Notable barrier islands in New Zealand include Matakana Island, which guards the entrance to Tauranga Harbour, and Rabbit Island, at the southern end of Tasman Bay. See also Nelson Harbour's Boulder Bank, below.

=== India ===
The Vypin Island in the Southwest coast of India in Kerala is 27 km long. It is also one of the most densely populated islands in the world.

=== Indonesia ===
The Indonesian Barrier Islands lie off the western coast of Sumatra. From north to south along this coast they include Simeulue, the Banyak Islands (chiefly Tuangku and Bangkaru), Nias, the Batu Islands (notably Pini, Tanahmasa and Tanahbala), the Mentawai Islands (mainly Siberut, Sipura, North Pagai and South Pagai Islands) and Enggano Island.

=== Europe ===
Barrier islands can be observed in the Baltic Sea from Poland to Lithuania as well as distinctly in the Wadden Islands, which stretch from the Netherlands to Denmark. Lido di Venezia and Pellestrina are notable barrier islands of the Lagoon of Venice which have for centuries protected the city of Venice in Italy. Chesil Beach on the south coast of England developed as a barrier beach. Barrier beaches are also found in the north of the Azov and Black seas.

== Formation theories ==
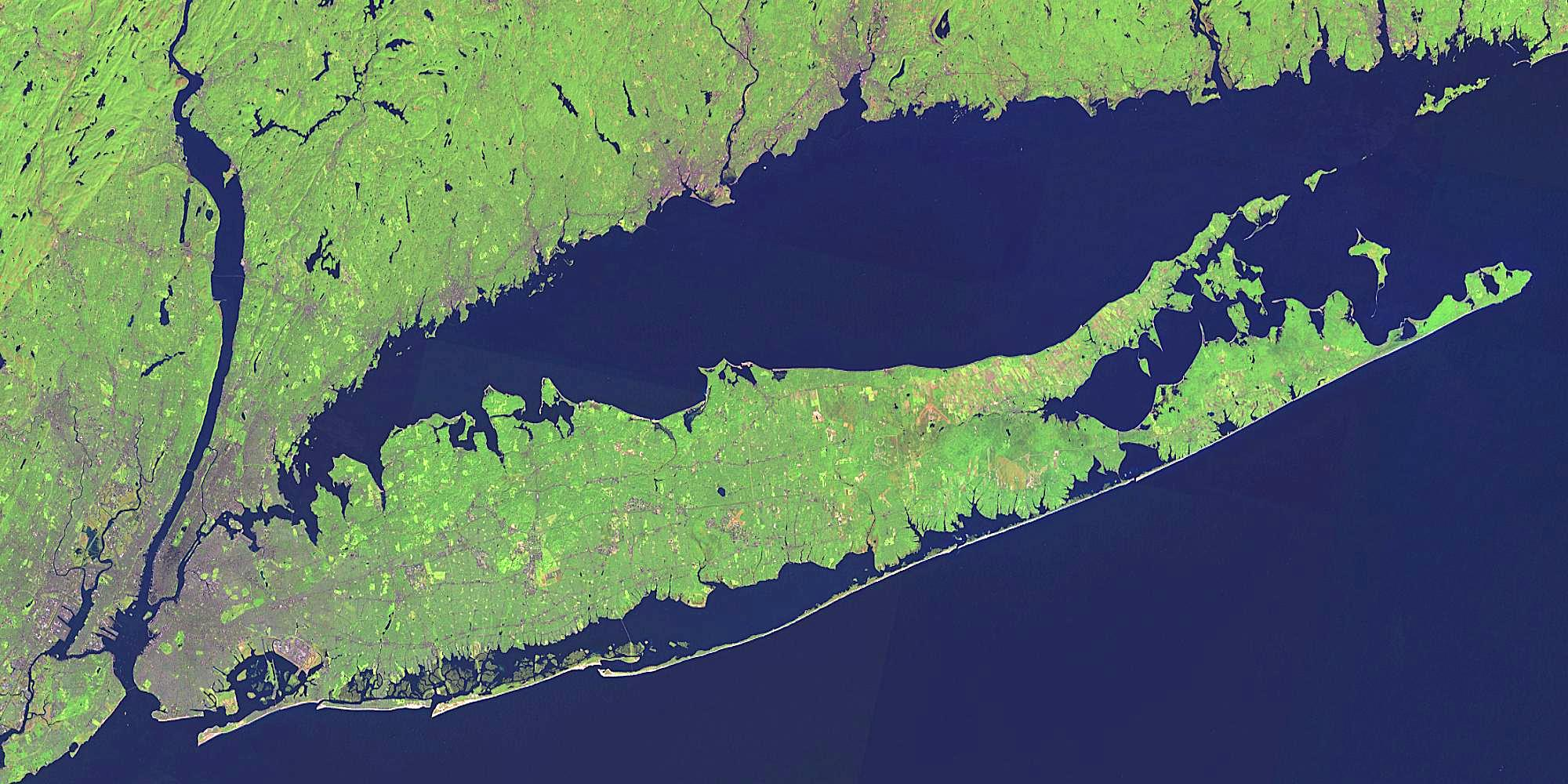
Outer barrier in Long Island

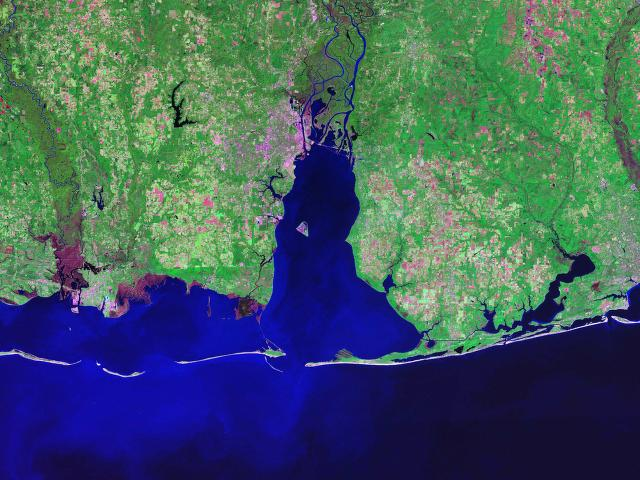
The Mississippi–Alabama barrier islands guarding Mobile Bay and the Mississippi Sound

Scientists have proposed numerous explanations for the formation of barrier islands for more than 150 years. There are three major theories: offshore bar, spit accretion, and submergence. No single theory can explain the development of all barriers, which are distributed extensively along the world's coastlines. Scientists accept the idea that barrier islands, including other barrier types, can form by a number of different mechanisms.

There appears to be some general requirements for formation. Barrier island systems develop most easily on wave-dominated coasts with a small to moderate tidal range. Coasts are classified into three groups based on tidal range: microtidal, 0–2 meter tidal range; mesotidal, 2–4 meter tidal range; and macrotidal, >4 meter tidal range. Barrier islands tend to form primarily along microtidal coasts, where they tend to be well developed and nearly continuous. They are less frequently formed in mesotidal coasts, where they are typically short with tidal inlets common. Barrier islands are very rare along macrotidal coasts. Along with a small tidal range and a wave-dominated coast, there must be a relatively low gradient shelf. Otherwise, sand accumulation into a sandbar would not occur and instead would be dispersed throughout the shore. An ample sediment supply is also a requirement for barrier island formation. This often includes fluvial deposits and glacial deposits. The last major requirement for barrier island formation is a stable sea level. It is especially important for sea level to remain relatively unchanged during barrier island formation and growth. If sea level changes are too drastic, time will be insufficient for wave action to accumulate sand into a dune, which will eventually become a barrier island through aggradation. The formation of barrier islands requires a constant sea level so that waves can concentrate the sand into one location and build up to form the island.

=== Offshore bar theory ===
In 1845 the Frenchman Elie de Beaumont published an account of barrier formation. He believed that waves moving into shallow water churned up sand, which was deposited in the form of a submarine bar when the waves broke and lost much of their energy. As the bars developed vertically, they gradually rose above sea level, forming barrier islands.

Several barrier islands have been observed forming by this process along the Gulf coast of the Florida peninsula, including: the North and South Anclote Bars associated with Anclote Key, Three Rooker Island, Shell Key, and South Bunces Key.

=== Spit accretion theory ===
American geologist Grove Karl Gilbert first argued in 1885 that the barrier sediments came from longshore sources. He proposed that sediment moving in the breaker zone through agitation by waves in longshore drift would construct spits extending from headlands parallel to the coast. The subsequent breaching of spits by storm waves would form barrier islands.

=== Submergence theory ===
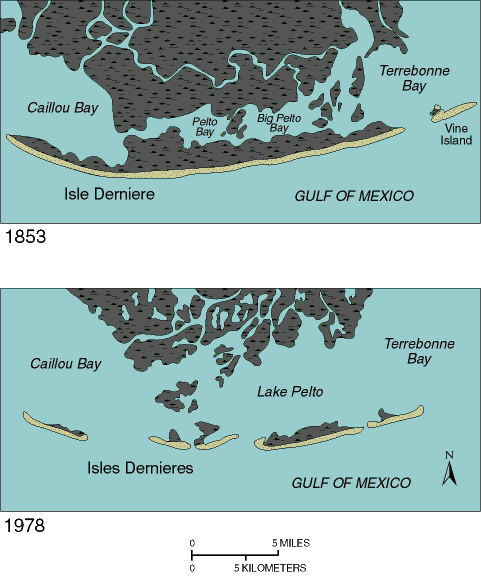
Isles Dernieres in 1853 and 1978. Wave action detaches Isles Dernieres from the mainland.

William John McGee reasoned in 1890 that the East and Gulf coasts of the United States were undergoing submergence, as evidenced by the many drowned river valleys that occur along these coasts, including Raritan, Delaware and Chesapeake bays. He believed that during submergence, coastal ridges were separated from the mainland, and lagoons formed behind the ridges. He used the Mississippi–Alabama barrier islands (consists of Cat, Ship, Horn, Petit Bois and Dauphin Islands) as an example where coastal submergence formed barrier islands. His interpretation was later shown to be incorrect when the ages of the coastal stratigraphy and sediment were more accurately determined.

Along the coast of Louisiana, former lobes of the Mississippi River delta have been reworked by wave action, forming beach ridge complexes. Prolonged sinking of the marshes behind the barriers has converted these former vegetated wetlands to open-water areas. In a period of 125 years, from 1853 to 1978, two small semi-protected bays behind the barrier developed as the large water body of Lake Pelto, leading to Isles Dernieres's detachment from the mainland.

=== Boulder Bank ===
An unusual natural structure in New Zealand may give clues to the formation processes of barrier islands. The Boulder Bank, at the entrance to Nelson Haven at the northern end of the South Island, is a unique 13 km-long stretch of rocky substrate a few metres in width. It is not strictly a barrier island, as it is linked to the mainland at one end. The Boulder Bank is composed of granodiorite from Mackay Bluff, which lies close to the point where the bank joins the mainland. It is still debated what process or processes have resulted in this odd structure, though longshore drift is the most accepted hypothesis. Studies have been conducted since 1892 to determine the speed of boulder movement. Rates of the top-course gravel movement have been estimated at 7.5 metres a year.

== Types ==
Barrier islands can be classified by their dominant coastal processes that influence their formation and change over time.

=== Wave-dominated ===
Wave-dominated barrier islands are long, low, and narrow, and usually are bounded by unstable inlets at either end. The presence of longshore currents caused by waves approaching the island at an angle will carry sediment long, extending the island. Longshore currents, and the resultant extension, are usually in one direction, but in some circumstances the currents and extensions can occur towards both ends of the island (as occurs on Anclote Key, Three Rooker Bar, and Sand Key, on the Gulf Coast of Florida). Washover fans on the lagoon side of barriers, where storm surges have over-topped the island, are common, especially on younger barrier islands. Wave-dominated barriers are also susceptible to being breached by storms, creating new inlets. Such inlets may close as sediment is carried in them by longshore currents, but may become permanent if the tidal prism (volumn and force of tidal flow) is large enough. Older barrier islands that have accumulated dunes are less subject to washovers and opening of inlets. Wave-dominated islands require an abundant supply of sediment to grow and develop dunes. If a barrier island does not receive enough sediment to grow, repeated washovers from storms will migrate the island towards the mainland.

=== Mixed-energy ===
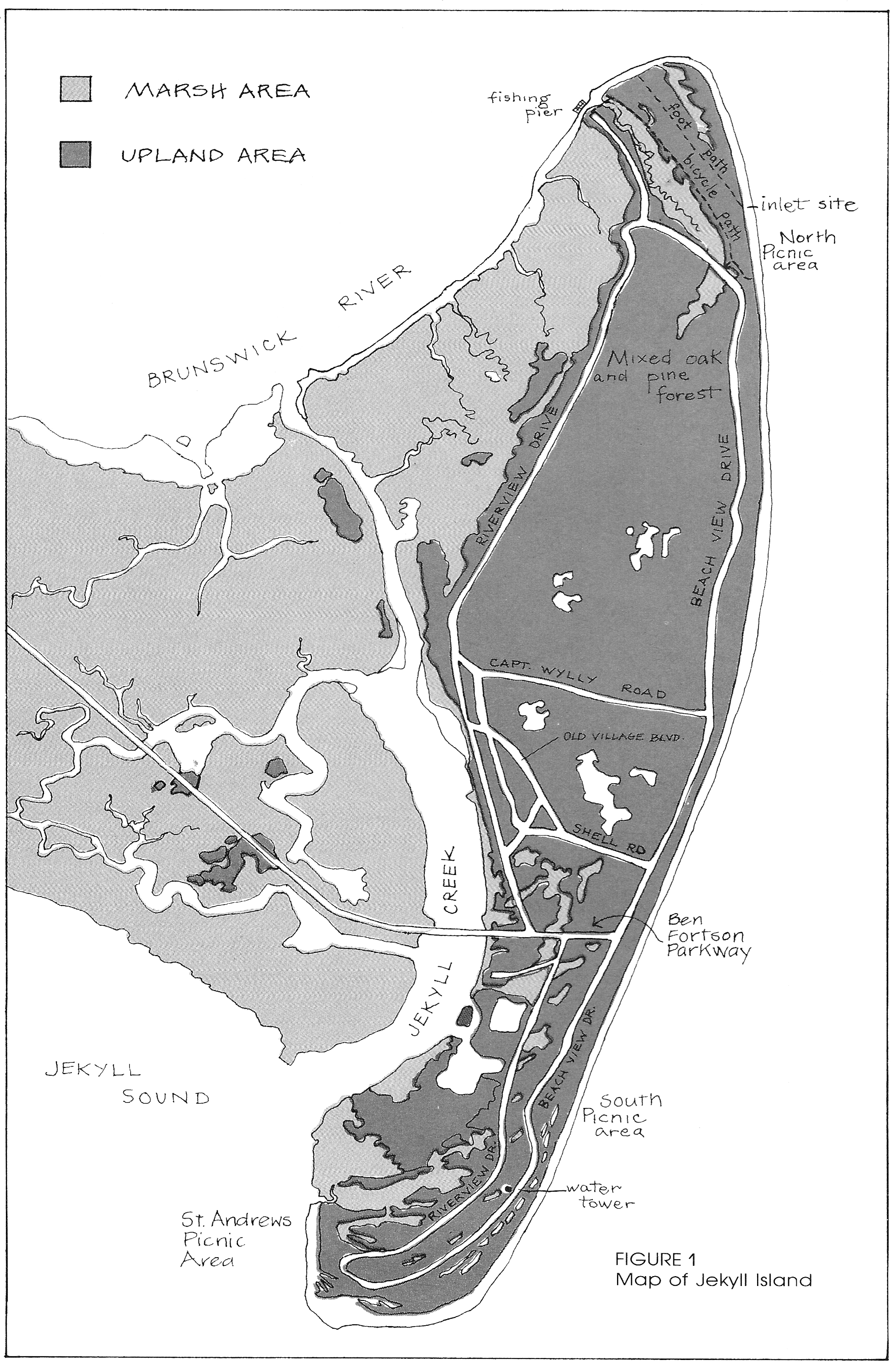
Jekyll Island, in the U.S. state of Georgia

Wave-dominated barrier islands may eventually develop into mixed-energy barrier islands. Mixed-energy barrier islands are molded by both wave energy and tidal flux. The flow of a tidal prism moves sand. Sand accumulates at both the inshore and off shore sides of an inlet, forming a flood delta or shoal on the bay or lagoon side of the inlet (from sand carried in on a flood tide), and an ebb delta or shoal on the open water side (from sand carried out by an ebb tide). Large tidal prisms tend to produce large ebb shoals, which may rise enough to be exposed at low tide. Ebb shoals refract waves approaching the inlet, locally reversing the longshore current moving sand along the coast. This can modify the ebb shoal into swash bars, which migrate into the end of the island up current from the inlet, adding to the barrier's width near the inlet (creating a "drumstick" barrier island). This process captures sand that is carried by the longshore current, preventing it from reaching the downcurrent side of the inlet, starving that island.

Many of the Sea Islands in the U.S. state of Georgia are relatively wide compared to their shore-parallel length. Siesta Key, Florida has a characteristic drumstick shape, with a wide portion at the northern end near the mouth of Phillipi Creek.

=== Fetch-Limited Barrier Islands ===
Fetch-Limited barrier islands are defined by the difference in waves they are exposed to. These barrier islands are shaped by small, local waves that are on a smaller and lower-energy scale than barrier islands formed by open-ocean waves. These barrier islands are still formed in the same way as ocean-facing islands, but with much lower-energy. Fetch-limited barrier islands can be found all over the world, with over 63% coming from the Northern Hemisphere. North America makes up the largest percentage, with just over 30% of all fetch-limited barrier islands.

During fair-weather conditions, fetch-limited islands experience locally generated waves under one meter high. Because wave energy is low under these conditions, most significant geomorphic change occurs during storms. As a result, fetch-limited barrier islands are generally shorter and narrower than ocean-facing barriers.

== Ecological importance ==
Barrier islands are critically important in mitigating ocean swells and other storm events for the water systems on the mainland side of the barrier island, as well as protecting the coastline. This effectively creates a unique environment of relatively low energy, brackish water. Multiple wetland systems such as lagoons, estuaries, and/or marshes can result from such conditions depending on the surroundings. They are typically rich habitats for a variety of flora and fauna. Without barrier islands, these wetlands could not exist; they would be destroyed by daily ocean waves and tides as well as ocean storm events. One of the most prominent examples is the Louisiana barrier islands.

== See also ==
- North Frisian Barrier Island
- Outer Banks
- Virginia Barrier Islands
- New York Barrier Islands
- Texas barrier islands
- Sea Islands
- Long Beach Island
- Bald Head Island
- Dauphin Island
- Plum Island (Massachusetts)

== Sources ==
- Davis, Richard A. Jr.; FitzGerald, Duncan M. (2004), Beaches and Coasts, United Kingdom: Blackwell Publishing, ISBN 978-0-632-04308-8
- Davis, Richard A. Jr. (2016). Barrier Islands of the Florida Gulf Coast Peninsula. Sarasota, Florida: Pineapple Press. ISBN 978-1-56164-8085.
- Morton, Robert A. (2007), "Historical Changes in the Mississippi-Alabama Barrier Islands and the Roles of Extreme Storms, Sea level, and human activities" (PDF), USGS Report, Open-File Report, U. S. Geological Survey: 43, Bibcode:2007usgs.rept...43M, doi:10.3133/ofr20071161
