= Overwash =

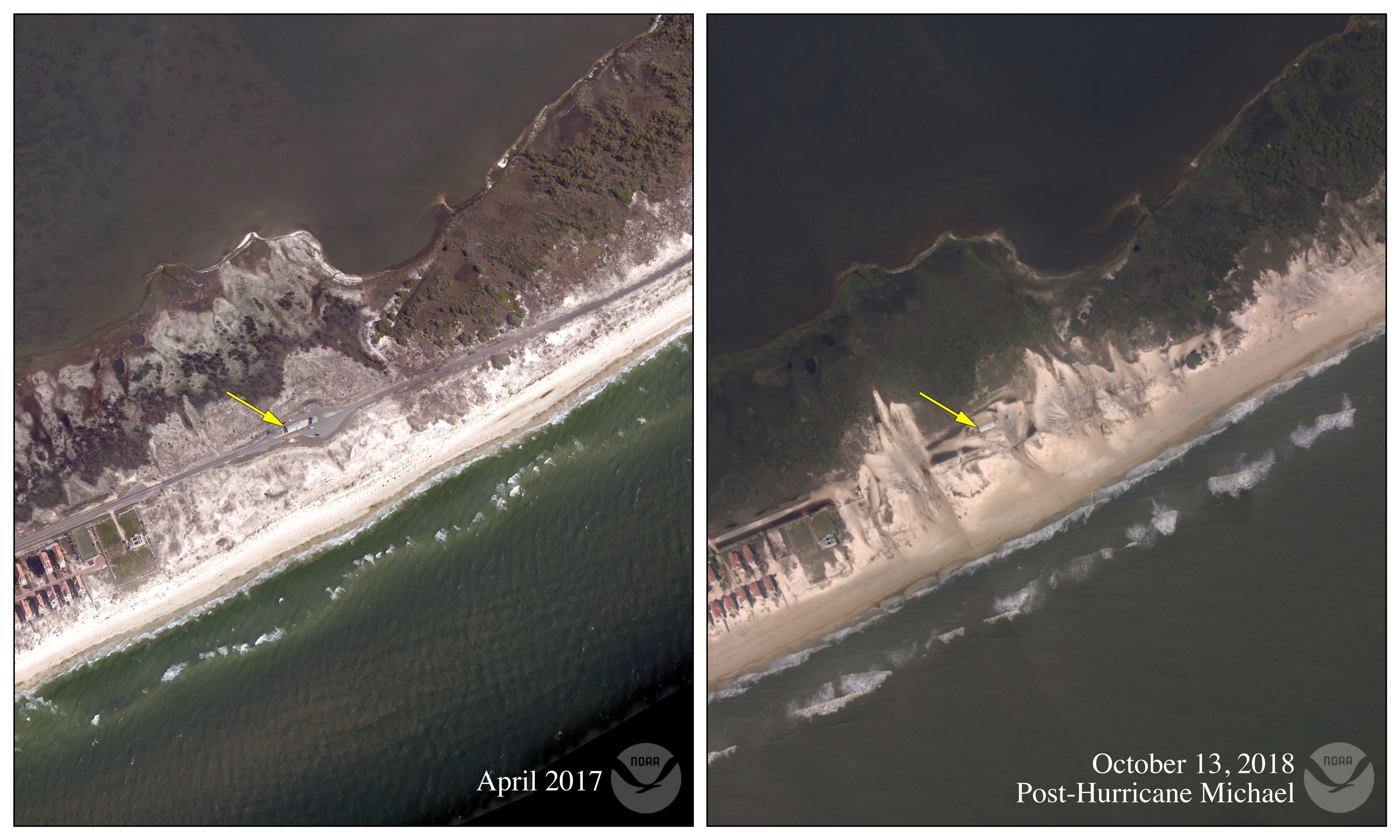
Washover on St. George Island from Hurricane Michael, 2018.

Overwash is the flow of water and sediment over a coastal dune or beach crest during storm events (or other situations with high water). 'Overwash' may refer only to the landward flux of water due to overtopping of a dune system while 'washover' may refer to the sediment deposited by overwash. A common process on barrier islands, Overwash redistributes sediment and facilitates the migration of barrier islands in response to sea level rise. Overwash can occur as a result of runup (the maximum height of the swash), or inundation.

Deposition from overwash (washover) can be deposited onto the beach berm, the dune, or as far as the back barrier bay, marsh, estuary, or lagoon. Sediment deposits created during overwash exhibit consistent scaling — for example, the distance inland that an overwash deposit extends is proportional to the area that the overwash deposit covers. The distance inland that an overwash deposit extends is also correlated with the volume of sand deposited. The amount of overwash and washover sedimentation also depends on the characteristics of the storm and the setting — coastal development tends to reduce the amount of sand deposited on a barrier island during overwash, with consequences for barrier island evolution.

The stratigraphic layers of sediment in an overwash deposit can be used to estimate the duration of the storm that caused the deposition. In paleotempestology, overwash deposits are frequently used to reconstruct prehistoric tropical cyclones. Sediment deposited via overwash can also impact the rate of growth of salt marsh plants — a small amount of sand deposited can increase salt marsh plant growth, but too much deposited sand will kill vegetation.

During large storms, overwash deposits can self-organize into a periodic, rhythmic pattern, where overwash deposits occur at a regular spacing along the shoreline.
