= Battle of Mobile Bay order of battle =

The order of battle for the Union and Confederate forces at the Battle of Mobile Bay on August 5, 1864.

== Union ==
=== Navy ===
Commander : Rear Admiral David Farragut

14 wooden ships:

- USS Brooklyn (screw sloop) — Captain James Alden
- USS Galena (950-ton ironclad gunboat/screw steamer) — Lieutenant Commander Clark H. Wells
- USS Hartford (2900-ton screw sloop; Farragut's flagship) — Flag Captain Percival Drayton
- USS Itasca (gunboat) — Lieutenant Commander George Brown
- USS Kennebec (gunboat) — Lieutenant Commander William P. McCann
- USS Lackawanna (1240-ton steam screw sloop-of-war) — Captain John B. Marchand
- USS Metacomet (1173-ton Sassacus-class "double-ender" steam gunboat) — Lieutenant Commander James Edward Jouett
- USS Monongahela (screw sloop) — Commander James H. Strong
- USS Octorara (981-ton "double-ender" side-wheel gunboat) — Lieutenant Commander Charles H. Green
- USS Oneida (screw sloop) — Commander J. R. Madison Mullaney
- USS Ossipee (1240-ton steam screw sloop) — Commander William E. Le Roy
- USS Port Royal (sidewheel steamer gunboat "double-ender") — Lieutenant Commander Bancroft Gherardi
- USS Richmond (screw sloop) — Captain Thornton A. Jenkins
- USS Seminole (screw sloop) — Commander Edward Donaldson

4 ironclad monitors:

- USS Chickasaw (1300-ton Milwaukee-class ironclad river monitor, twin-turrets) — Lieutenant Commander George H. Perkins
- USS Manhattan (2100-ton Canonicus-class monitor) — Commander James W. Nicholson
- USS Tecumseh (2100-ton Canonicus-class monitor) — Commander Tunis Craven (sunk by torpedo)
- USS Winnebago (1300-ton Milwaukee-class ironclad river monitor, twin-turrets) — Commander Thomas H. Stevens, Jr.

=== Army (August 3-8) ===
Division	Brigade	Regiments and Others
Mobile Bay Land Forces; MG Gordon Granger	Dauphin Island BG George F. McGinnis	77th Illinois: Colonel David P. Grier; 34th Iowa: Colonel George W. Clark; 96th Ohio: Colonel Albert H. Brown; 3rd Maryland Cavalry: Col Charles C. Tevis; 96th USCT: Col John C. Cobb

=== Army (August 9-23) ===
Division	Brigade	Regiments and Others
Mobile Bay Land Forces; Major General Gordon Granger	Clark's Brigade (3rd Bde, 3rd Div, XIX Corps) Colonel George W. Clark	77th Illinois: Colonel David P. Grier; 67th Indiana: Ltc Francis A. Sears; 34th Iowa: Colonel George W. Clark; 96th Ohio Infantry: Colonel Albert H. Brown
Mobile Bay Land Forces; Major General Gordon Granger	Bertram's Brigade (2nd Bde, Mobile Bay Land Forces) Colonel Henry Bertram	94th Illinois: Col John McNulta; 20th Iowa: Col William M. Dye, Cpt Edward Coulter; 38th Iowa: Ltc Joseph O. Hudnutt; 20th Wisconsin: Ltc Henry A. Starr
Mobile Bay Land Forces; Major General Gordon Granger	Guppey's Brigade (3rd Bde, 2nd Div, XIX Corps) Colonel Joshua James Guppey	161st New York: Col William B. Kinsey; 23rd Wisconsin: Ltc Edmund Jüssen
Mobile Bay Land Forces; Major General Gordon Granger	Engineer Brigade (XIX Corps) Brevet Brigadier General Joseph Bailey	96th U.S.C.T — Colonel John C. Cobb; 97th U.S.C.T. — Ltc George A. Harmount; 1st Pontoniers — Captain J.J. Smith
Mobile Bay Land Forces; Major General Gordon Granger	Artillery (XIX Corps) Brigadier General Richard Arnold	1st Indiana Heavy Artillery: Major William Roy; 6th Michigan Heavy Artillery; 2nd Connecticut Heavy Artillery: Lt Walter S. Hotchkiss; 17th Ohio Battery: Capt C. S. Rice; Battery "A", 2nd Regiment Illinois Volunteer Light Artillery: Capt H. Borris, Lt Frank B. Fenton
Mobile Bay Land Forces; Major General Gordon Granger	Cavalry	3rd Maryland Cavalry; Company A, 2nd Maine Volunteer Cavalry Regiment; Company M, 14th New York Cavalry

== Confederate ==
=== Navy ===
Commander: Admiral Franklin Buchanan (captured)

1 ironclad:

- CSS Tennessee (1273-ton ironclad ram; Buchanan's flagship) — Captain James D. Johnston (captured)

3 gunboats:

- CSS Gaines (863-ton side-wheel gunboat) — Lieutenant Commander J. W. Bennett (grounded and abandoned)
- CSS Morgan (863-ton side-wheel gunboat) — Commander George W. Harrison
- CSS Selma (320-ton side-wheel gunboat) — Lieutenant Peter U. Murphey (captured)

=== Army ===
District	Post	Regiments and Others
District of the Gulf; Major-General Dabney H. Maury	Fort Morgan (garrison about 600) Brigadier General Richard L. Page	1st Alabama Artillery Battalion; 21st Alabama Infantry (1 Company); 1st Tennessee Artillery Regiment
District of the Gulf; Major-General Dabney H. Maury	Fort Gaines (garrison about 600) Col Charles D. Anderson	21st Alabama Infantry (6 Companies); 1st Alabama Artillery Battalion (2 Companies); Pelham Cadets; Reserves & Marines
District of the Gulf; Major-General Dabney H. Maury	Fort Powell (garrison about 140) Lt Col James M. Williams	21st Alabama Infantry (2 Companies); Culpeper's South Carolina Battery
