= List of shipwrecks in February 1863 =

The list of shipwrecks in February 1863 includes ships sunk, foundered, grounded, or otherwise lost during February 1863.

== 1 February ==
List of shipwrecks: 1 February 1863
Ship	State	Description
Agneea	United Kingdom	The sloop was lost in the North Sea. Her crew were rescued by Maonia (Netherlands).
Andville	United States	The ship ran aground on the Pratas Shoal, in the South China Sea and was wrecked. All on board, more than 150 people, survived. She was on a voyage from Hong Kong to San Francisco, California.
Cordelia	United States	The ship was driven ashore and wrecked at Veracruz, Mexico. She was on a voyage from New York to Veracruz.
Eliza	United Kingdom	The schooner was driven ashore in the Belfast Lough. She was on a voyage from the Clyde to a French port. She was refloated.
Industry	United Kingdom	American Civil War, Union blockade: The 200-ton schooner, a blockade runner carrying a cargo of salt, was forced aground 5 miles (8.0 km) north of New Topsail Inlet, North Carolina, Confederate States of America by the armed screw steamer USS Mount Vernon (United States Navy) and burned by her crew. Union forces then scuttled her.
Radiant	United Kingdom	The brig ran aground on the Brake Sand, off the coast of Kent. She was on a voyage from Blyth, Northumberland to Porto, Portugal. She was refloated with the assistance of a tug.

== 2 February ==
List of shipwrecks: 2 February 1863
Ship	State	Description
Falke, and Logan	Hamburg; United Kingdom	The brigs were in collision off Cape de Gatt, Spain and were both severely damaged. Falke was on a voyage from Trieste to Rio de Janeiro, Brazil. Logan was on a voyage from Newcastle upon Tyne, Northumberland to Cartagena, Spain.

== 3 February ==
List of shipwrecks: 3 February 1863
Ship	State	Description
Adamantine	United Kingdom	The ship was wrecked on the English Bank, in the River Plate with the loss of all but three of her crew. She was on a voyage from Liverpool, Lancashire to Buenos Aires, Argentina and/or Montevideo, Uruguay.
Alarm	United Kingdom	The ship was lost on the Leman Sand, in the North Sea with the loss of three of her six crew. She was on a voyage from Seaham, County Durham to London.
A. W. Baker	Confederate States of America	American Civil War: The 112-ton sidewheel paddle steamer was run aground by her crew and then captured and burned in the Mississippi River 15 miles (24 km) below the mouth of the Red River of the South by the sidewheel paddle steamer USS Queen of the West (United States Navy).
Berwick Bay	Confederate States of America	American Civil War: The 64-ton sidewheel paddle steamer, carrying a cargo of cotton, flour, molasses, and sugar, was captured and burned in the Mississippi River about 15 miles (24 km) below the mouth of the Red River of the South by the sidewheel paddle steamer USS Queen of the West (United States Navy).
Doune Castle	United Kingdom	The ship ran aground on the Scroby Sands, Norfolk. She was on a voyage from Hartlepool, County Durham to London. She was refloated and taken in to Great Yarmouth, Norfolk in a severely leaky condition.
Marie Banks	United States	Bound for the shipyard at Fort Monroe, Virginia, Confederate States of America with a cargo of rigging, the schooner was wrecked 3 miles (4.8 km) southeast of Cape Henry, Virginia.
Mary Blyth	United Kingdom	The ship foundered off Great Yarmouth, Norfolk.
Moro	Confederate States of America	American Civil War: The 132-ton sidewheel paddle steamer, carrying a cargo of hogs, pork, and salt, was captured and burned in the Mississippi River 15 miles (24 km) below the mouth of the Red River of the South by the sidewheel paddle steamer USS Queen of the West (United States Navy).
Palmetto	United States	American Civil War, CSS Alabama's Gulf of Mexico Expeditionary Raid: The 172-ton schooner, bound from New York City to San Juan, Puerto Rico, was captured and burned in the Atlantic Ocean (27°18′27″N 66°10′00″W) by the screw sloop-of-war CSS Alabama (Confederate States Navy).
William H. Starke	Confederate States of America	Carrying corn and other cargo, the steamer sank in 30 feet (9.1 meters) of water in the Savannah River20 miles (32 km) below Augusta, Georgia.

== 4 February ==
List of shipwrecks: 4 February 1863
Ship	State	Description
Aurelie	France	The ship was abandoned in the North Sea 105 nautical miles (194 km) west north west of Texel, North Holland, Netherlands. Her crew were rescued by a fishing smack. She was on a voyage from Sunderland, County Durham, United Kingdom to Gijón, Spain.
Brutus	United Kingdom	The ship was abandoned in the North Sea. She was on a voyage from Aberdeen to Sunderland, County Durham.
Fanny Huntley	United Kingdom	The brig was abandoned in the Atlantic Ocean. Her crew were rescued by Louisa (United Kingdom).
Harp	United Kingdom	The ship was driven ashore at Campbeltown, Argyllshire. She was on a voyage from Westport, County Mayo to Liverpool, Lancashire. She was refloated and taken in to Campbelltown in a severely leaky condition.
Napoleon III	United Kingdom	The brig was abandoned in the Atlantic Ocean. Her crew were rescued. She was on a voyage from Matanzas, Cuba to Saint John's, Newfoundland, British North America.
Unidentified barge or boat	United States	American Civil War: The barge or boat was burned by Confederate States Army forces on the Cumberland River near Dover, Tennessee, Confederate States of America.

== 5 February ==
List of shipwrecks: 5 February 1863
Ship	State	Description
Ann	United Kingdom	The brig was wrecked on the Kettleness Rock, off the coast of Yorkshire. Her crew were rescued by Hopewell (United Kingdom). Ann was on a voyage from South Shields, County Durham to London.
Ellen	United Kingdom	The schooner was driven ashore at Redcar, Yorkshire. She was on a voyage from Sunderland, County Durham to Rochester, Kent. She was refloated the next day and taken in to Hartlepool, County Durham in a leaky condition.
Friends	United Kingdom	The schooner ran aground on the Sizewell Bank, in the North Sea off the coast of Suffolk. She was on a voyage from Sunderland to Ventnor, Isle of Wight. She was refloated with assistance from the smack Ranger (United Kingdom) and assisted in to Lowestoft, Suffolk in a leaky condition.
Gamma	United Kingdom	The schooner ran aground on the Kettleness Rock. She was on a voyage from Whitby, Yorkshire to the River Tyne. She was refloated and put back to Whitby.
Norval	United Kingdom	The ship was wrecked in the Jardinellos. Her crew were rescued. She was on a voyage from Cienfuegos, Cuba to Greenock, Renfrewshire.
CSS Selma	Confederate States Navy	American Civil War: The sidewheel gunboat struck an underwater obstruction while trying to cross the Dog River Bar in Mobile Bay, Alabama, and sank in 8 feet (2.4 meters) of water. The Confederates refloated her on 13 February, repaired her, and returned her to service.
Unnamed	France	The ship was wrecked on the Isle of Wight, United Kingdom.
Unnamed	United Kingdom	The brig was driven ashore at Ringkøbing, Denmark.

== 6 February ==
List of shipwrecks: 6 February 1863
Ship	State	Description
Advance	United States	The 39-ton sternwheel towboat struck a snag and sank in the Wabash River at Hutsonville, Illinois.
Favourite	United Kingdom	The sloop struck rocks at Eyemouth, Berwickshire and was damaged. She was on a voyage from Eyemouth to Sunderland, County Durham.
George and Ann	United Kingdom	The smack was driven ashore at Redcar, Yorkshire. She was on a voyage from Seaham, County Durham to Portsmouth, Hampshire. She was refloated and taken in to Hartlepool, County Durham in a leaky condition.
Georgina	United States	The ship was abandoned in the Atlantic Ocean. She was on a voyage from New York to Jacmel, Haiti.
Geyser	Russia	The brig ran aground on the Goodwin Sands, Kent, United Kingdom. She was on a voyage from South Shields, County Durham to Barcelona, Spain. She was refloated and subsequently towed in to Ramsgate, Kent in a severely leaky condition by the tug Ruby (United Kingdom).
Perseverance	United Kingdom	The ship was driven ashore west of Blakeney, Norfolk She was on a voyage from Hartlepool to Dover, Kent. She was refloated with the assistance of a tug and taken in to Blakeney in a leaky condition.
Robert Trent	United Kingdom	The ship was abandoned in the Atlantic Ocean. Her crew were rescued by Arkwright (United Kingdom). Robert Trent was on a voyage from New York, United States to Liverpool, Lancashire.
Sir Colin Campbell	United Kingdom	The brig was driven ashore in Sandown Bay. She was on a voyage from London to Africa. She was refloated and towed to Portsmouth, Hampshire, where she sank.
Solide	Greifswald	The ship ran aground on the Sizewell Bank, in the North Sea off the coast of Suffolk, United Kingdom and sank. Her crew were rescued.

== 7 February ==
List of shipwrecks: 7 February 1863
Ship	State	Description
Ada	(United Kingdom of Great Britain and Ireland) British North America	The barque ran aground at Saint John, New Brunswick. She was on a voyage from Saint John to Liverpool, Lancashire. She was refloated with the assistance of two tugs and put back to Saint John.
Agia Sofia	Ottoman Empire	The steamship ran aground at Castle Point. She was refloated the next day.
USS Glide	United States Navy	The tinclad sternwheel gunboat caught fire while under repair on the Mississippi River one mile (1.6 km) below Cairo, Illinois. She was cast adrift and floated 1 to 2 nautical miles (1.9 to 3.7 km) downstream before grounding on the Kentucky side of the river near Fort Holt and burning to the waterline, with some shells on board exploding. Two people were killed.
Harp	United Kingdom	The ship ran aground at Campbeltown, Argyllshire. She was on a voyage from Waterford to Liverpool, Lancashire. She was refloated.
Jenny Lind	United Kingdom	The sloop was wrecked in the Farne Islands, Northumberland. Her crew were rescued. She was on a voyage from Newcastle upon Tyne, Northumberland to Fraserburg, Aberdeenshire.
HMS Orpheus	Royal Navy	Painting The Wreck of HMS Orpheus, by Richard Brydges Beechey (1808–1895). The Jason-class corvette ran onto a sandbar and was destroyed by waves at Whatipu, Manukau Harbour, New Zealand. There were 189 dead and 70 survivors. It remains New Zealand's most deadly shipwreck.
Peri	United Kingdom	The ship was driven ashore at Berck, Pas-de-Calais, France. She was on a voyage from Dartmouth, Devon to Newcastle upon Tyne. She was consequently condemned.
Queen of England	United Kingdom	The ship ran aground on the Goodwin Sands, Kent. She was on a voyage from London to Madras, India. She was refloated and towed in to Ramsgate, Kent.

== 8 February ==
List of shipwrecks: 8 February 1863
Ship	State	Description
Adam Clark	United Kingdom	The schooner was driven ashore at Great Yarmouth, Norfolk. She was on a voyage from Sunderland, County Durham to London. She was refloated.
Agnes	Stettin	The schooner was wrecked near Polangen, Russia. Her crew were rescued. She was on a voyage from Memel, Prussia to Hull, Yorkshire, United Kingdom.
Diamond	United Kingdom	The schooner was wrecked near Polangen. Her crew were rescued. She was on a voyage from Memel to Hull.
Friends	United Kingdom	The brig ran aground at Aberdovey, Merionethshire. Her crew were rescued by the Aberdovey Lifeboat.
Ranger	United Kingdom	The ship departed from Brăila, Ottoman Empire for a British port. No further trace, presumed foundered with the loss of all hands.
St. Germains	United Kingdom	The ship was driven ashore east of Folkestone, Kent. She was on a voyage from Newcastle upon Tyne, Northumberland to Huelva, Spain. She was refloated and taken in to Dover, Kent in a leaky condition.
Traveller	United Kingdom	The schooner ran aground on the Gunfleet Sand, in the North Sea off the coast of Suffolk. She was on a voyage from Caen, Calvados, France to London. She was refloated and assisted in to Harwich, Essex in a leaky condition.

== 9 February ==
List of shipwrecks: 9 February 1863
Ship	State	Description
Isabel	United States	The 1,115-ton sidewheel paddle steamer, carrying 20 passengers – one of them transporting US$8,000 in gold – and a cargo of dry goods, provisions, leather, and hay, a large amount of express matter, and a safe containing US$5,000, sank in the Atlantic Ocean off Barnegat, New Jersey with the loss of four lives almost immediately after colliding with North Star (Flag unknown).
John George	United Kingdom	The brig collided with a barque and foundered in the Bristol Channel. Her crew were rescued.
Mary Richards	United Kingdom	The barque was driven ashore and severely damaged at Little Brook, Nova Scotia, British North America. She was on a voyage from Dublin to Saint John, New Brunswick, British North America.
Plimevene	France	The schooner was run down and sunk off the Longships Lighthouse, Cornwall, United Kingdom by the full-rigged ship Wandering Jew (United States) with the loss of a crew member. Survivors were rescued by Wandering Jew. Plimevene was on a voyage from Swansea, Glamorgan, United Kingdom to a French port.

== 10 February ==
List of shipwrecks: 10 February 1863
Ship	State	Description
America	United Kingdom	The schooner was driven ashore in Tarpaulin Cove, Massachusetts, United States. She was on a voyage from Cornwallis, Nova Scotia, British North America to New York, United States.
Cecilia	United Kingdom	The schooner was wrecked on Anholt, Denmark. Her crew were rescued. She was on a voyage from Middlesbrough, Yorkshire to Copenhagen, Denmark.
Duke of Malakoff	United Kingdom	The full-rigged ship ran aground and was wrecked at Mauritius. She was on a voyage from Pondicherry, India to Mauritius.
Jane	United Kingdom	The schooner was driven ashore in the New Inlet, New Jersey, United States. She was on a voyage from Port-au-Prince, Haiti to New York.
Salisbury	United Kingdom	The ship was driven ashore and wrecked at Kilmore, County Wexford. She was on a voyage from London to Derry.]

== 11 February ==
List of shipwrecks: 11 February 1863
Ship	State	Description
Eliza	United Kingdom	The schooner was wrecked on the Ravy Rocks, off the south coast of Devon. She was on a voyage from Fareham, Hampshire to Padstow, Cornwall.
Franansderne	United States	The ship was driven ashore. She was on a voyage from New York to Liverpool, Lancashire, United Kingdom. She was refloated and put back to New York.
Good Hope	United Kingdom	The ship was wrecked at Kettleness, Yorkshire. She was on a voyage from Scarborough, Yorkshire to Hartlepool, County Durham.
Mary and Elizabeth	United Kingdom	The smack was driven ashore and damaged in Blackwater Bay. She was on a voyage from Londonderry to Tarbert, Argyllshire.
Triumph	United States	The ship was wrecked on the Gingerbread Grounds. She was on a voyage from New York to Matanzas, Cuba.

== 12 February ==
List of shipwrecks: 12 February 1863
Ship	State	Description
Emilie Friederiche	Stettin	The brig ran aground on the Lysegrund. She was on a voyage from Sunderland, County Durham, United Kingdom to Copenhagen, Denmark. She was refloated and taken in to Copenhagen in a leaky condition.
Flora	Stettin	The schooner was wrecked at "Iversted" or "Twersted", on the west coast of Denmark. She was on a voyage from Hartlepool, County Durham to Stettin.
Mary Ann Pritchard	United Kingdom	The ship departed from Portland, Maine, United States for Liverpool, Lancashire. No further trace, presumed foundered with the loss of all hands.
Mary E. Pindar	Confederate States of America	American Civil War, Union blockade: After being captured by the barque USS Gemsbok (United States Navy) on 22 September 1862, the schooner was lost in the Atlantic Ocean off Federal Point, North Carolina, Confederate States of America.
Rusko Castle	United Kingdom	The ship ran aground on Scroby Sands, Norfolk. She was on a voyage from London to Hartlepool. She was refloated.

== 13 February ==
List of shipwrecks: 13 February 1863
Ship	State	Description
George	United Kingdom	The ship was driven ashore at Blakeney, Norfolk. She was on a voyage from "Readly" to London.
Jacob Bell	United States	CSS Florida burns Jacob Bell in a Harper's Weekly illustration from 1863. American Civil War: The clipper, carrying 41 people and a cargo of camphor, chow chow, firecrackers, matting, and tea, was burned in the Atlantic Ocean southwest of Bermuda (25°03′N 67°00′W) by the screw sloop-of-war CSS Florida (Confederate States Navy).
Laurie	France	Second French intervention in Mexico, Battle of Tampico: The steamship ran aground at Tampico and was burnt to prevent her capture by the Mexicans.
Memento	United Kingdom	The brig ran aground on Inchkeith, Fife. She was on a voyage from Grimsby, Lincolnshire to Leith, Lothian.
Sceptre	United Kingdom	The collier, a brig, was run down and sunk in the River Thames by the steamship Scotia (United Kingdom) with the loss of three of her crew. Sceptre was on a voyage from Middlesbrough, Yorkshire to London.
Wallace	United Kingdom	The ship was wrecked at Thisted, Denmark with the loss of two of her crew. She was on a voyage from Hull, Yorkshire to Stockholm, Sweden.
War Hawk	United Kingdom	The ship was run into by the full-rigged ship Uncowak (United States) and was abandoned in the Atlantic Ocean. She was on a voyage from Messina, Sicily, Italy to Liverpool, Lancashire.

== 14 February ==
List of shipwrecks: 14 February 1863
Ship	State	Description
CSS American Diver	Confederate States Navy	Also known as CSS Pioneer II, the prototype submarine sank in Mobile Bay, Alabama, while under tow in stormy weather. There were no deaths.
Dan	United States	The 112-ton sidewheel paddle steamer sank in the Mississippi River.
De Soto	United States	American Civil War: The 1,200-ton sidewheel paddle steamer ran aground on the Red River of the South below Fort Taylor, Louisiana, Confederate States of America and lost her rudder. Unable to steer, she drifted 15 nautical miles (28 km) downriver, then was burned to prevent her capture by Confederate forces. A coal barge she was towing also was burned.
Joseph Fish	United Kingdom	The barque sank off Gun Key, off the coast of Florida, Confederate States of America. Her crew survived. She was on a voyage from Cárdenas, Cuba to a British port.
Mary Ann	United Kingdom	The schooner was driven ashore near Drogheda, County Louth. Her crew were rescued by the Drogheda Lifeboat.
Confederate forces.	United States Navy	American Civil War: The sidewheel paddle steamer ran aground on the Red River of the South at Fort Taylor, Louisiana, and was captured by
Rose	United Kingdom	The sloop ran aground in the River Trent. She was on a voyage from Susworth, Lincolnshire to Great Yarmouth, Norfolk. She was later refloated and resumed her voyage in a leaky condition.
Williams	United Kingdom	The ship collided with Mystery (United Kingdom) and sank off the coast of Cornwall. Her crew were rescued. She was on a voyage from Newport, Monmouthshire to Plymouth, Devon.
Unidentified vessel	Flag unknown	American Civil War: Aground with cargo aboard on a shoal in Bulls Bay off the coast of South Carolina, Confederate States of America, the vessel was burned by the barque USS Restless (United States Navy).

== 15 February ==
List of shipwrecks: 15 February 1863
Ship	State	Description
Angeline	France	The lugger foundered 40 nautical miles (74 km) north north east of The Lizard, Cornwall, United Kingdom. Her crew were rescued by the barque Marshmallow (United Kingdom). Angeline was on a voyage from Camaret-sur-Mer, Finistère to Cardiff, Glamorgan, United Kingdom.
Warhawk	United Kingdom	The ship was discovered derelict in the Atlantic Ocean (46°52′N 10°35′W) by Anglo-Saxon ( (United Kingdom of Great Britain and Ireland) British North America) and Ratcliffe (United Kingdom), having been in collision with another vessel and abandoned by her crew. Both vessels put crew on board, and she was taken in to Gibraltar, where she arrived on 3 March.

== 16 February ==
List of shipwrecks: 16 February 1863
Ship	State	Description
Adeburto	Mexico	The schooner was wrecked at Veracruz.
Dove	United Kingdom	The ship foundered in Whitesand Bay.
Esperanzo	Mexico	The schooner was wrecked at Veracruz.
John Payson	United States	The barque was wrecked at Veracruz.
Mantura	United Kingdom	The brig was wrecked on Skyros, Greece.
Norval	United Kingdom	The barque was wrecked either at Sisal, Mexico, or on the Jardinellos. Her crew survived. She was on a voyage from Cienfuegos, Cuba to Greenock, Renfrewshire.
Ocean Chief	(United Kingdom of Great Britain and Ireland) New South Wales	The ship was driven ashore in Keppel Bay. She was refloated and taken in to Rockhampton, Queensland for repairs.
Sherwood	United States	The barque was wrecked at Veracruz.
T. B. Bertram	United States	The barque was wrecked at Veracruz.

== 17 February ==
List of shipwrecks: 17 February 1863
Ship	State	Description
Balmoral	United Kingdom	The ship ran aground at Galway. She was on a voyage from Odesa to Galway.
Beeswing	United States	Schooner "Beeswing" Captain Young. Capsized on sandbar San Francisco Harbor, California. All aboard [11 Crew and passengers] were lost. Among those who were lost was Monterey County Deputy Sheriff Thomas W Day and two prisoners named Martin Rubio and Christopher Barbee, en rout to San Quentin.
Hercules	United States	American Civil War: Towing seven coal barges in fog on the Mississippi River off Hopefield, Arkansas, opposite Memphis, Tennessee, Confederate States of America, the 151-ton sternwheel tug was captured by troops of the Arkansas Cavalry Company (Confederate States Army) with the loss of one of her crew. Union gunboats then sank her and one of the barges with gunfire, after which the Confederates set her on fire and she burned to the water's edge.
Hotspur	United States	The mediium clipper ran aground on a reef in the Paracel Islands and was wrecked. All 35 people on board took to three boats with the ultimate loss of one life. She was on a voyage from Foo Chow, China to New York.
Lady Duffus	United Kingdom	The schooner ran aground on Little Pentland Skerry, Orkney Islands and was wrecked. Her crew were rescued. She was on a voyage from Runcorn, Cheshire to Dundee, Forfarshire. She capsized and sank on 20 February.
Nemesis	United Kingdom	The steamship struck the Bellows Rock, off Galle, Ceylon and was damaged. After putting in to Galle, she sailed for Bombay, India for repairs.
Sunnyside	United Kingdom	The barque was driven ashore on Monarch Island, Outer Hebrides.
Violet	United Kingdom	The schooner was driven ashore west of Blakeney, Norfolk. She was on a voyage from Newcastle upon Tyne, Northumberland to Milan, Italy.

== 18 February ==
List of shipwrecks: 18 February 1863
Ship	State	Description
Comet	United Kingdom	The ship was run down and sunk at Madeira by the steamship Gerente (Portugal). All on board were rescued. She was on a voyage from London to Madeira.
Denis Carty	United Kingdom	The ship was driven ashore at Wexford.
Elma	United States	During a voyage from New York City to $1, Maryland, with an assorted cargo, the schooner burned on Virginia′s East River.
George	United Kingdom	The ship was driven ashore at Warham, Norfolk. She was on a voyage from Keadby, Lincolnshire to Dartford, Kent.
Harmony	United Kingdom	The ship was driven ashore at Turnberry Point, Ayrshire. She was on a voyage from Portrush, County Antrim to Troon, Ayrshire. Shew as refloated on 20 February and taken in to Ayr in a leaky condition.
Johanna Antoinette	Spain	The ship was driven ashore on the Isle of Arran, United Kingdom. She was on a voyage from Glasgow, Renfrewshire, United Kingdom to Alfaques. She was refloated and put back to Greenock, Renfrewshire.
Maggie	United Kingdom	The schooner was run into by the steamship Falcon (United Kingdom) in the River Foyle and was beached in a severely damaged condition. She was on a voyage from Glasgow to Londonderry.
Rondinella	United Kingdom	The ship ran aground on the Folstrup Sand, off the coast of Denmark. She was on a voyage from Sunderland, County Durham to Copenhagen, Denmark. She had become a wreck by 21 March.
Victoria	(United Kingdom of Great Britain and Ireland) Victoria	The ship was wrecked at Port Albert. She was on a voyage from Port Albert to Otago, New Zealand.

== 19 February ==
List of shipwrecks: 19 February 1863
Ship	State	Description
Frankfort	United Kingdom	The ship was wrecked on the Lambuena Reef, in the South China Sea with the loss of 32 of her 33 crew. She was on her maiden voyage, from Cardiff, Glamorgan to Shanghai, China.
Laconic	United Kingdom	The barque was wrecked on the Helwick Shoal in the Bristol Channel. Her crew survived. She was on a voyage from Swansea, Glamorgan, to Tenerife, Canary Islands.
Swan	United States	The 487-bulk-ton sidewheel paddle steamer foundered in the Gulf of Mexico during a voyage from Key West, Florida, to New Orleans, Louisiana, Confederate States of America.

== 20 February ==
List of shipwrecks: 20 February 1863
Ship	State	Description
Brunsbüttel	United Kingdom	The galeas ran aground on the Kratsand, in the North Sea.
Custos	Hamburg	The ship ran aground on Tinkers Ledge, in the English Channel. She was on a voyage from Callao, Peru to Hamburg. She was refloated and towed into Southampton, Hampshire, United Kingdom for repairs.
Laconic	United Kingdom	The ship ran aground on the Helwick Swatch, in the Bristol Channel off the coast of Glamorgan and was wrecked. She was on a voyage from Swansea, Glamorgan to Tenerife, Canary Islands.

== 21 February ==
List of shipwrecks: 21 February 1863
Ship	State	Description
Belford	United Kingdom	The schooner ran aground on the Elbow End Bank, off the mouth of the River Tay. She was on a voyage from Sunderland, County Durham to Dundee, Forfarshire. She was refloated and taken in to Dundee in a severely leaky condition.
Golden Eagle	United States	American Civil War, CSS Alabama's South Atlantic Expeditionary Raid: The 1,121-ton clipper, carrying a cargo of guano from Howland Island to Cork, United Kingdom, was captured and burned in the North Atlantic Ocean (29°28′N 44°58′W) by the screw sloop-of-war CSS Alabama (Confederate States Navy).
Helen and Mary	United Kingdom	The schooner ran aground at Kinnaird Head, Aberdeenshire. She was on a voyage from Easdale, Argyllshire to Glenbughty Bay. She was refloated and resumed her voyage.
Olive Jane	United States	American Civil War, CSS Alabama's South Atlantic Expeditionary Raid: The 360-ton barque, bound from Bordeaux, Gironde, France to New York with a cargo of wine, brandy, and delicacies, was captured and burned by the screw sloop-of-war CSS Alabama (Confederate States Navy).
Perthsshire	United Kingdom	The barque ran aground on the Goodwin Sands, Kent. She was on a voyage from Sunderland, County Durham to Trinidad. She was refloated with assistance and taken in to Ramsgate, Kent, where she arrived on 27 February.
Rowallan	United Kingdom	The ship was driven ashore in the Douro. She was on a voyage from Newcastle upon Tyne, Northumberland to Porto, Portugal.
Sebastian Cabot	Hamburg	The ship was driven ashore in Jutland Bay. She was on a voyage from Callao, Peru to Hamburg.

== 22 February ==
List of shipwrecks: 21 February 1863
Ship	State	Description
Margareth	Prussia	The galiot was driven ashore and wrecked on Bornholm, Denmark. She was on a voyage from London, United Kingdom to Memel.
Merrimac	United States	The 100-ton tug capsized with the loss of 13 lives while trying to cross the Humboldt Bar at Humboldt Bay on the coast of California, Confederate States of America; there were five survivors. She then grounded twice more while floating upside down. She later was salvaged.
Peri	United Kingdom	The ship was wrecked on the Morte Stone, off the coast of Devon. Her crew were rescued. She was on a voyage from Salcombe, Devon to Newport, Monmouthshire.
Rosalie	France	The ship was lost in Bay Blanchard. Her crew were rescued. She was on a voyage from Granville, Manche to Cherbourg, Seine-Inférieure.
Samuel J. Christian	United States	The brigantine was run ashore and wrecked near Ilfracombe, Devon. Her crew were rescued. She was on a voyage from Bordeaux, Gironde, France to Cardiff, Glamorgan and/or Newport, Monmouthshire.
Rover	United Kingdom	The ship was wrecked at Cape Town, Cape Colony.
Theron	United Kingdom	The barque was driven ashore at Beyrout, Ottoman Syria. She broke up in a gale on 26 February. Her crew survived.

== 23 February ==
List of shipwrecks: 23 February 1863
Ship	State	Description
Amalia	Bremen	The barque was wrecked in the Patchosan Group. She was on a voyage from Hong Kong to Shanghai, China.
Arabella	United Kingdom	The ship capsized in Simons Bay. She was consequently condemned
Florence Nightingale	Confederate States of America	American Civil War:The Schooner was destroyed by USS Sagamore off New Smyrna, Florida.
USS Kinsman	United States Navy	American Civil War: The ironclad river gunboat struck a snag and sank in Berwick Bay near Brashear City, Louisiana, Confederate States of America, while transporting a detachment of troops. Six men were reported missing.
Pioneer	United Kingdom	The ship was driven ashore near "Nighann", Sweden. She was on a voyage from Fraserburgh, Aberdeenshire to a Baltic port.

== 24 February ==
List of shipwrecks: 24 February 1863
Ship	State	Description
Anne Dobson	United Kingdom	The brig ran aground on the Goodwin Sands, Kent. She was on a voyage from Sulina, Ottoman Empire to Ipswich, Suffolk. She was refloated the next day with the assistance of a tug and towed in to Ramsgate, Kent.
Ben Bolt	Confederate States of America	American Civil War: The barge was captured and destroyed in Back Creek on the York River in Virginia by two cutters from the armed sidewheel paddle steamer USS Mahaska (United States Navy).
Era No. 7	United States	American Civil War: The sternwheel paddle steamer struck a snag and sank in the Mississippi River 20 miles (32,000 m) below Warrenton, Mississippi, Confederate States of America.
USS Indianola	United States Navy	American Civil War: The sidewheel paddle steamer was run aground in a sinking condition on the Mississippi River above the Red River of the South after being rammed by the rams CSS Webb and CSS Queen of the West (both Confederate States Navy). She was then captured by Confederate forces.
Jane and Ann	United Kingdom	The ship ran aground on the Scroby Sands, Norfolk. She was on a voyage from Hartlepool, County Durham to London.
Mary Jane	Confederate States of America	American Civil War: The 30-ton sloop was captured and destroyed in Back Creek by two cutters from the armed sidewheel paddle steamer USS Mahaska (United States Navy).
Queen of the Wave	United Kingdom	American Civil War, Union blockade: The 775-bulk-ton screw steamer, a blockade runner with a cargo of tin sheets, quinine, morphine, opium, calico, and printing paper, was forced to run aground near the mouth of the North Santee River on the coast of South Carolina, Confederate States of America by the armed sidewheel paddle steamer USS Conemaugh (United States Navy). Her crew set her on fire and abandoned ship. Conemaugh blew her up, breaking her in half, on 7 March.
Resolution	United Kingdom	The ship ran aground at Poole, Dorset. She was on a voyage from Odesa to Poole. She was refloated.

== 25 February ==
List of shipwrecks: 25 February 1863
Ship	State	Description
USS Indianola	United States Navy	USS Indianola explodes in a sketch by Theodore R. Davis, published in Harper's Weekly in 1863. American Civil War: Confederate salvage crews working to refloat the sidewheel paddle steamer – aground in a sinking condition on the Mississippi River above the Red River of the South since 24 February – panicked when they received word that a large Union gunboat was approaching. They set fire to Indianola, which burned to the waterline and blew up when flames reached her magazines. The "gunboat" turned out to be an unarmed barge disguised to look like a warship and sent downstream to trick the Confederates into abandoning or destroying Indianola.
Wearmouth	United Kingdom	The steamship ran aground off Flamborough Head, Yorkshire. She was on a voyage from Sunderland, County Durham to London. She was refloated and resumed her voyage.

== 26 February ==
List of shipwrecks: 26 February 1863
Ship	State	Description
Caldera	United Kingdom	The ship was driven ashore at Liverpool, Lancashire. She was on a voyage from Sunderland, County Durham to Liverpool.
Mary E. Hiltz	United States	The schooner was lost off Marblehead, Massachusetts, on her homeward passage from Newfoundland, during a violent snow storm. 1 Crewman died.

== 27 February ==
List of shipwrecks: 27 February 1863
Ship	State	Description
Energie	United Kingdom	The ship was wrecked on the Anegada Reef. She was on a voyage from Iquique, Chile to a British port.
Jeune Euphemie	France	The ship was driven ashore at North Somercotes, Lincolnshire, United Kingdom. She was on a voyage from Saint-Malo, Ille-et-Vilaine to Hull, Yorkshire, United Kingdom. She was refloated.

== 28 February ==
List of shipwrecks: 28 February 1863
Ship	State	Description
Era No. 5	United States	American Civil War: After Union forces had dismantled the 115-ton sidewheel paddle steamer, her parts were scattered and sunk in the Mississippi River below Vicksburg, Mississippi, Confederate States of America.
Horsilla	United Kingdom	The brig was driven ashore in the Yangtze Kiang.
Rattlesnake	Confederate States of America	American Civil War, Union blockade: After the Confederate privateer ran aground in the Ogeechee River in Georgia, the monitor USS Montauk (United States Navy) destroyed her with gunfire.

== Unknown date ==
List of shipwrecks: Unknown date in February 1863
Ship	State	Description
Actress	United Kingdom	The ship was wrecked near Land's End, Cornwall.
Amalia	United Kingdom	The ship was wrecked near Morant Point, Jamaica before 14 February. She was on a voyage from Kingston, Jamaica to St. Jago de Cuba, Cuba.
Artershoff	Denmark	The ship was wrecked on Skagen. She was on a voyage from Sunderland, County Durham, United Kingdom to Copenhagen.
Beeswing	United States	The schooner was wrecked near the Golden Gate, California with the loss of eight lives.
Betsy Hall	United Kingdom	The ship ran aground off "Port Berkely", Antigua. She was on a voyage from Baltimore, Maryland, United States to Queenstown, County Cork. She was refloated.
B. L. Provie	United Kingdom	The ship was wrecked. She was on a voyage from Calcutta, India to Mauritius.
Camillas	United States	The ship was driven ashore at Barnegat, New Jersey. She was on a voyage from Martinique to New York. She was refloated and taken in to New York, where she arrived on 15 February.
Caroline Saints	United Kingdom	The ship was driven ashore at "Varoe" before 10 February.
Carrier Dove	United States	The full-rigged ship was driven ashore at Portmagee, County Kerry, United Kingdom. She had been refloated by 20 February. Subsequently towed to Liverpool, Lancashire by the tug Brother Jonathan (United Kingdom).
Charlotte	United Kingdom	The smack was driven ashore and wrecked at Larne, County Antrim before 5 February.
Edith	United Kingdom	The ship foundered before 21 February. Her crew were rescued.
Empuhendedora	Brazil	The ship foundered off Pernambuco. She was on a voyage from. Bahia to Lisbon, Portugal.
Immanuel	Kingdom of Hanover	The schooner foundered in the Irish Sea. Her crew were rescued by the fishing smack Star of the East (United Kingdom).
J. R. Whiting, or J. R. Whitney)	Flag Unknown	The schooner was lost on the Noyo River, California on 13 or 16 February. She was refloated, repaired, and returned to service.
Kate Hooper	United Kingdom	The ship was destroyed by fire at Melbourne, Victoria.
Maria Louisa	Netherlands	The ship was driven ashore at Buenos Aires, Argentina before 21 February. She was consequently condemned.
Montagu	France	The ship was driven ashore at Guadeloupe.
Parana	United Kingdom	The ship was lost off Cape Race, Newfoundland, British North America before 14 February.
Pearl	United Kingdom	The ship was driven ashore at Larne before 5 February. She was refloated and taken in to Larne.
Poelina	Brazil	The ship foundered off Pernambuco. She was on a voyage from Bahia to London.
Reaper	United States	The full-rigged ship was driven ashore in the River Tyne. She was on a voyage from the River Tyne to Naples, Italy. She was refloated and resumed her voyage.
Relief, or Pilot Boat No. 2)	United States	The pilot boat capsized in the breakers at the San Francisco Bar with the loss of four crewmen.
Rothesay	United Kingdom	The ship was wrecked at Harbour Grace, Newfoundland. Her crew were rescued. She was on a voyage from New York to Harbour Grace. The wreck was plundered by the local inhabitants.
Samuel Watts	United States	The full-rigged ship foundered in the Atlantic Ocean. Her crew were rescued by Adriatic (United Kingdom). She was on a voyage from New York to Liverpool.
CSS Slidell	Confederate States of America	American Civil War: The gunboat was destroyed on the Tennessee River sometime before 6 February.
Vedra	United Kingdom	The brig ran aground near the Nakkehead Lighthouse, Denmark. She was refloated and taken in to Helsingør, Denmark, where she arrived on 27 February.
