= Black Terror (ship) =

Fake warship used in American Civil War

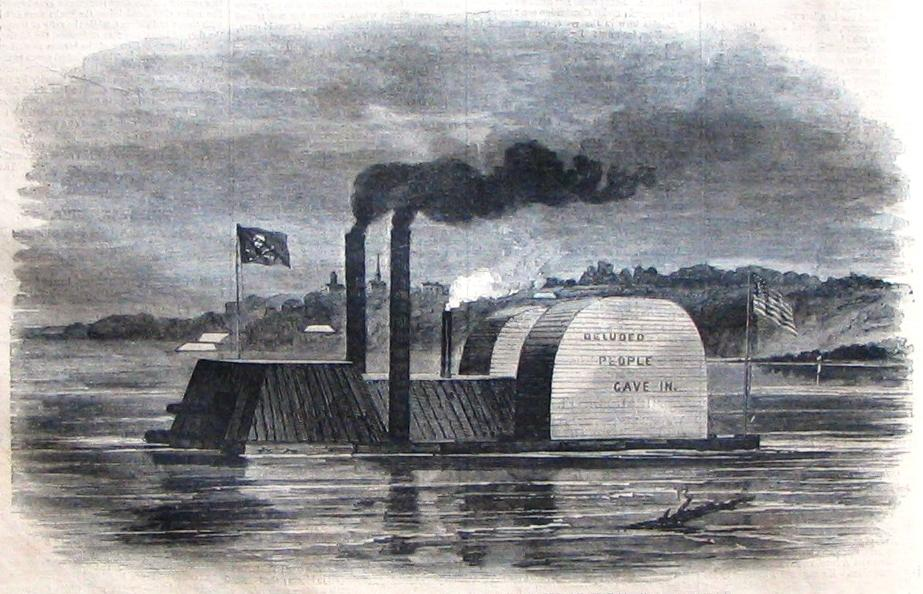
An 1863 depiction of Black Terror

Black Terror was a fake warship used in the American Civil War to bluff Confederate forces into destroying the partially-salvaged remains of the ironclad USS Indianola. Union forces were advancing to control the Mississippi River and had made two attempts to capture Vicksburg, Mississippi, in 1862. Early the next year, the ram USS Queen of the West moved downriver to interfere with Confederate shipping on the Red River; Indianola was sent down a few days later. However, Queen of the West was disabled and captured after an encounter with Confederate field fortifications, and Indianola was severely damaged on February 24 after an attack by the repaired Queen of the West and CSS William H. Webb.

Not wanting Indianola to be repaired and enter Confederate service like Queen of the West, Union Navy officer David Dixon Porter had a fake ironclad constructed to bluff Confederate salvage workers into destroying the wreck of Indianola. A flatboat or barge was expanded with logs, and outfitted with fake cannons, lifeboats, and smokestacks. The fake vessel cost less than $9 (equivalent to $189 in 2020) and was named Black Terror. At 23:00 on February 25, the fake ship was released downstream, and successfully convinced the Confederates that it represented a real threat. Believing they faced an actual warship, the Confederate salvage crew of Indianola blew up the ship's remains, although some cannons were later recovered. The naval historian Myron J. Smith has since suggested that Black Terror was actually a later fake designed to reveal the location of Confederate artillery batteries, and that the story has been conflated with a possible earlier ruse aimed at forcing the destruction of Indianola.

== Background ==
In 1861, during the opening stages of the American Civil War, Winfield Scott, the Commanding General of the United States Army, proposed the Anaconda Plan as a method of forcing the surrender of the Confederate States of America. An important part of this plan was controlling the Mississippi River, which would sever the Confederacy in two and provide an outlet for northern goods to be shipped to foreign markets. While the Anaconda Plan was not adopted as official policy, control of the Mississippi was adopted as a major Union objective. By early 1862, Union victories including the Battle of Fort Donelson, the First Battle of Memphis, and the Capture of New Orleans had led to Union control of much of the Mississippi Valley. After the fall of New Orleans, Flag Officer David G. Farragut took a Union Navy force up the Mississippi towards Vicksburg, Mississippi, which was still controlled by the Confederates. However, Farragut's ships could not force the city into submission on their own, and with the river level falling, coal running short, and Farragut ill, the Union vessels fell back to New Orleans.

Farragut made another attempt in June, this time accompanied by an infantry force led by Brigadier General Thomas Williams and a group of ships armed with mortars led by Commodore David Dixon Porter. The naval elements were joined by a flotilla of ironclads led by Flag Officer Charles Henry Davis that had come downstream from Memphis, Tennessee. Farragut and Davis reached the conclusion that Vicksburg could not be taken by the navy forces without a larger infantry presence, which was unlikely to be released for the Vicksburg expedition at that time. Williams's men attempted to dig a canal that would bypass Vicksburg, but the attempt failed. In July Farragut and Williams withdrew downstream, and Davis's ships moved north to Helena, Arkansas. In August, Confederate forces created a second stronghold on the river by fortifying Port Hudson, Louisiana. Union infantry came downriver from Memphis and Helena in December 1862, but were repulsed at the Battle of Chickasaw Bayou.

=== Operations on the Red ===
Led by Major General Ulysses S. Grant, the Union Army of the Tennessee returned to the Vicksburg area in January 1863. While the Union soldiers failed in indirect attempts against Vicksburg, Confederate commerce continued along the Red River and the stretch of the Mississippi between Port Hudson and Vicksburg. Porter decided to send a naval force to interfere with the commerce. As many of his ironclads had engines that were too weak to easily travel back up the river, Porter sent the lightly armed ram USS Queen of the West past Vicksburg on February 2 to operate against the shipping. Queen of the West destroyed three Confederate ships and returned to Vicksburg. Later that month, she was sent downstream on a second mission; the ironclad USS Indianola was sent in support of Queen of the West several days later. However, Queen of the West was disabled and captured in a fight against Confederate land defenses along the Red on February 14. Queen of the West's survivors escaped on the steamer Era No. 5, and Indianola blockaded the mouth of the Red from February 17 to 21. Indianola retreated upriver, but was pursued by the captured and repaired Queen of the West, as well as the CSS William H. Webb, and two steamers. Queen of the West and William H. Webb caught up to Indianola on February 24 and severely damaged the Union ship by ramming it. Sinking, Indianola was abandoned by intentional grounding and abandoned by her crew, most of whom were captured. Three sailors escaped to tell Porter.

== Cruise of Black Terror ==
With the remains of Indianola in Confederate possession, salvage crews and impressed plantation slaves began working on the ship to get it repaired and refloated. United States Secretary of the Navy Gideon Welles believed that Indianola represented a significant threat in potential Confederate hands and ordered that a squadron of ships be sent to take the wreck back. Having recently lost two other rams to Confederate fire, Porter did not believe he had a sufficient number of ships for Welles's proposed squadron, and the ships he did have would have been at risk of being outmaneuvered by the faster William H. Webb and Queen of the West. Instead, Porter decided to create a fake ironclad to bluff the Confederates into abandoning the salvage of Indianola.

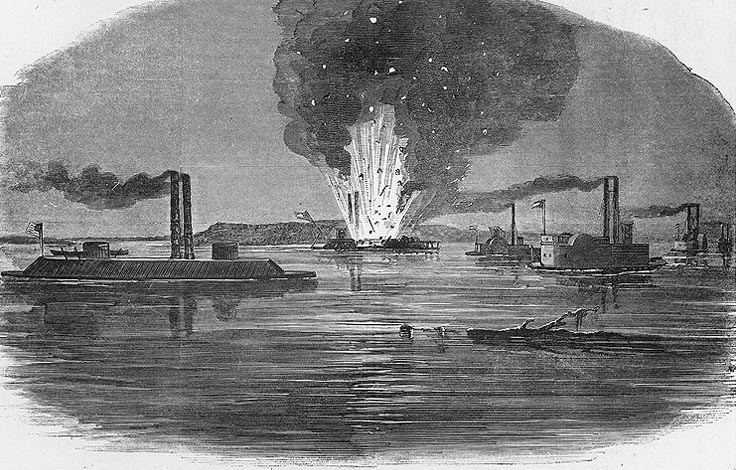
Destruction of Indianola, with Black Terror on the left

Porter, who described the loss of Indianola as "the most humiliating affair that has occurred during this rebellion", took a flatboat or coal barge and had logs added to it to create a structure resembling a ship's hull. The resulting vessel was 300 feet (91 m) long. (Note: One Union newspaperman stated that the vessel was instead 150 feet (46 m) long with a beam of 40 feet (12 m).) The housings for paddle wheels and a casemate were simulated with planks and canvas. The pilothouse was an outhouse. Two old boats were attached to davits. Logs served as cannons, and fake smokestacks were made from barrels. In order to give the contraption a black appearance, it was coated in mud and tar. Another illusion was made by mixing tar and oakum in pots, lighting the mixtures on fire, and placing them at the bottom of the "smokestacks" to produce smoke. Porter's creation was given the name Black Terror; it had cost either $8.23 (equivalent to $173 in 2020) or $8.63 (equivalent to $181 in 2020) and taken 12 hours to build. The words "Deluded people cave in" were written on the side of the ship, and it flew both the American flag and a skull and crossbones flag. (Note: One primary account states that the writing was instead "Confederate Mail Packet No. 1" on one side and "Secesh Sold" on the other.) The intention was for the vessel to be mistaken for the ironclad ram USS Lafayette.

Black Terror was set free into the Mississippi at 23:00 on February 25, from De Soto Point. After successfully navigating the stretch of the river near Vicksburg with minimal damage from the Confederate artillery there, she either became stuck in an eddy near the site of Grant's Canal or ran aground near Warrenton, Mississippi. Either way, she was pushed back into the river by Union soldiers. Queen of the West sighted the oncoming vessel on February 26 and informed the possibly drunk salvage crew, who decided to destroy Indianola to prevent her from returning to Union hands. At the time, the remains of the vessel were almost completely refloated, but could not be moved. Indianola's cannons were spiked, thrown into the Mississippi or blown up, and set the ship on fire, as orders for the ship's destruction had been sent from Carter Stevenson, the Confederate commander of Vicksburg. When the ship burned, it blew up in an explosion that was audible at the location of Porter's fleet. Confederate cavalry officer William Wirt Adams stated that only the vessel's alcohol supplies were preserved. He also believed that Queen of the West, William H. Webb, and the guns on Indianola would have been able to successfully defeat what he thought was a gunboat. After continuing on for 2 miles (3.2 km) further, Black Terror grounded on a mudbank about 1 mile (1.6 km) from the former location of Indianola. Confederate soldiers eventually investigated the ship's lack of activity and determined that it was a fake. Queen of the West, in turn, had collided with and damaged the transport Grand Era during her own retreat from the Union vessel.

The Richmond Examiner, a Confederate newspaper, lambasted the destruction of Indianola, stating "laugh and hold your sides lest you die of a surfeit of derision". The Vicksburg Whig also added criticism. Another Confederate attempt to raise the remains of Indianola took place in early March, but was unsuccessful except for the recovery of three cannons. Queen of the West and William H. Webb, which were still damaged from their fight with Indianola, withdrew up the Red and were no longer threats to the Union on the Mississippi. Later that year, both Vicksburg and Port Hudson were taken by Union forces. Vicksburg fell on July 4 after joint army-navy operations and the lengthy Siege of Vicksburg and Port Hudson surrendered on July 9, after hearing of the fall of Vicksburg. The Mississippi River was now under Union control.

=== Two ships hypothesis ===
Myron J. Smith wrote in his work Joseph Brown and his Civil War Ironclads that Porter had sent an earlier, less elaborate fake ironclad downriver towards the site of Indianola, which was the one that convinced the Confederates to destroy Indianola. Smith also refers to a letter from Porter which was published on March 25 that stated that he had not known for certain that Indianola was in Confederate hands when he sent the fake ironclad. As the second fake vessel, Black Terror would have been sent downriver in early March in order to provide evidence on where the Confederate batteries were located.

== Sources ==
- Barnhart, Donald L. (September 2003). "Admiral Porter's Ironclad Hoax". America's Civil War. 16 (4): 30–37. ISSN 1046-2899.
- Chatelain, Neil P. (2020). Defending the Arteries of Rebellion: Confederate Naval Operations in the Mississippi River Valley, 1861–1865. El Dorado Hills, California: Savas Beatie. ISBN 978-1-61121-510-6.
- Groom, Winston (2010) [2009]. Vicksburg 1863. New York: Vintage Books. ISBN 978-0-307-27677-3.
- Hearn, Chester G. (2000). Ellet's Brigade: The Strangest Outfit of All. Baton Rouge, Louisiana: Louisiana State University Press. ISBN 0-8071-2559-8.
- Kennedy, Frances H., ed. (1998). The Civil War Battlefield Guide (2nd ed.). Boston/New York: Houghton Mifflin. ISBN 978-0-395-74012-5.
- Legan, Marshall Scott (Summer 2000). "The Confederate Career of a Union Ram". The Journal of the Louisiana Historical Society. 41 (3): 277–300. JSTOR 4233674.
- Miller, Donald L. (2019). Vicksburg: Grant's Campaign that Broke the Confederacy. New York, New York: Simon and Schuster. ISBN 978-1-4516-4139-4.
- Shea, William L.; Winschel, Terrence J. (2003). Vicksburg Is the Key: The Struggle for the Mississippi River. Lincoln, Nebraska: University of Nebraska Press. ISBN 978-0-8032-9344-1.
- Smith, Myron J. (2017). Joseph Brown and His Civil War Ironclads: The USS Chillicothe, Indianola, and Tuscumbia. Jefferson, North Carolina: McFarland & Company. ISBN 978-0-7864-9576-4.
