= USS Indianola =

American casemate ironclad

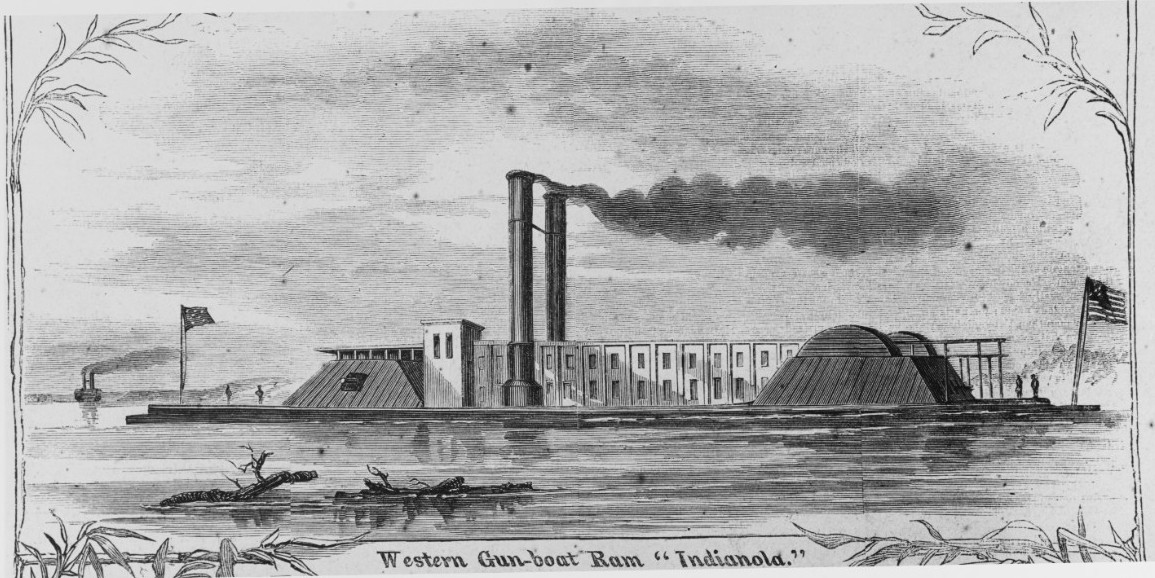
- USS Indianola in 1863

History

United States
- Name: Indianola
- Namesake: Indianola, Iowa
- Ordered: April 30, 1862
- Launched: September 4, 1862
- Commissioned: September 27, 1862
- Out of service: Sunk February 24, 1863 and sold on January 17, 1865
- Fate: Raised and sold after sinking

General characteristics
- Displacement: 511 tons
- Length: 174 ft (53 m) or 175 ft (53 m)
- Beam: 50 ft (15 m) or 52 ft (16 m)
- Draft: 5 ft (1.5 m)
- Propulsion: Sidewheel, Steam-driven screw
- Speed: 6 knots (11 km/h; 6.9 mph) or 9 knots (17 km/h; 10 mph)
- Complement: about 100
- Armament: 2 - 11-inch Dahlgren smoothbore; 2 - 9-inch Dahlgren smoothbore
- Armor: 3 inches (7.6 cm) of iron plate

USS Indianola was a casemate ironclad that served as a river gunboat for the Union Navy during the American Civil War. A side-wheel steamer also equipped with two screw propellers, Indianola was built in Cincinnati, Ohio in 1862 by Joseph Brown before being taken by Union authorities while still incomplete, in response to a perceived Confederate threat to Cincinnati. After completion, the vessel briefly served on the Mississippi River and the Yazoo River before being sent downstream of Vicksburg, Mississippi in February 1863, to support the naval ram USS Queen of the West, which was operating against Confederate shipping.

After Queen of the West was disabled and captured by Confederate forces, Indianola briefly blockaded the Red River before retreating upriver after learning that the Confederates intended to attack her. On February 24, Indianola was attacked by the repaired Queen of the West and the ram CSS William H. Webb. After being rammed several times and badly damaged, Indianola ran aground and was captured. After learning that the Confederates were attempting to salvage the wreck, Union forces constructed and sent a dummy ironclad downriver, which bluffed the Confederates into destroying the wreck. The remains of Indianola were raised in January 1865 and sold later that month.

== Construction and characteristics ==
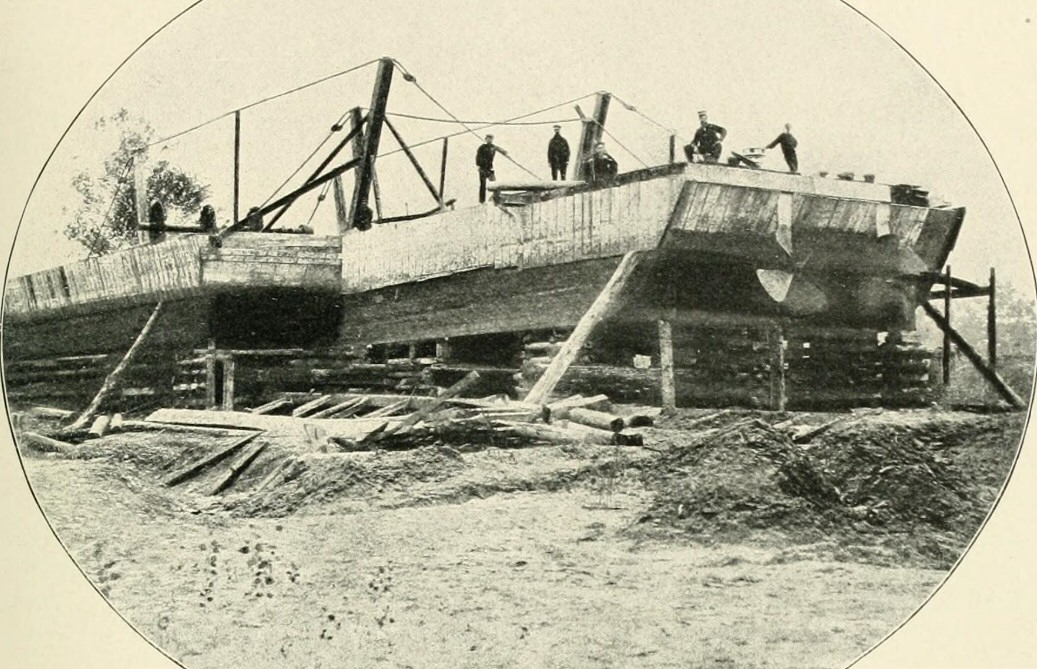
Building Indianola

On April 30, 1862, shipbuilder Joseph Brown of Cincinnati, Ohio, signed a contract with the United States government to build Indianola for $128,000. The vessel was named for the city of Indianola, Iowa. On September 1, Brown reported that Indianola was nearing completion.

She was still under construction when several brigades under the command of Confederate Brigadier General Henry Heth came within six miles of Cincinnati on September 6 during the Confederate Army's Kentucky Campaign. At the time, Major General Edmund Kirby Smith's corps of the Army of Tennessee was encamped at Lexington, Kentucky. Heth was under orders not to attack the city, but to instead make a "demonstration".

In response to the threat to Cincinnati, Union Major General Lew Wallace, who was in command of the defenses, appropriated the incomplete vessel to expedite its construction from Brown on September 2 and launched it on September 4. Heth withdrew to Lexington on September 12.

Fourteen days later after Wallace seized the Indianola, Acting Master Edward Shaw was appointed to command the ship, which had been placed into commission by September 27. Although fully armed and prepared to defend Cincinnati by October 23, Indianola was still incomplete. She was returned to Brown once the threat posed by Heth passed. By December, the ship was ready for general service, but the level on the Ohio River was too low at that time for Indianola to make it across the Falls of the Ohio. On January 23, 1863, the ship joined the Mississippi Squadron, having arrived at Cairo, Illinois. It had cost a total of $182,662.56 to complete the ship.

Indianola was a casemate ironclad serving as a river gunboat. She was a side-wheel steamer propelled by two wheels and two screw propellers. The propellers required machinery that took up space that would have otherwise been used for crew quarters. Her length was 174 feet (53 m) or 175 feet (53 m) with a beam of 50 feet (15 m) or 52 feet (16 m) and a draft of 5 feet (1.5 m); she displaced 511 tons. Indianola had a speed of either 6 knots (11 km/h; 6.9 mph) or 9 knots (17 km/h; 10 mph). The vessel was armed with four smoothbore Dahlgren guns: two 11-inch (28 cm) pieces and two 9-inch (23 cm). These guns were poorly positioned to only fire effectively to the fore and aft and had a slow rate of fire. The 11-inch guns were forward on the vessel and were mounted on pivots, while the 9-inch guns fired through ports. She was protected by 3 inches (7.6 cm) of iron plating serving as armor. Her complement was about 100 crew. Overall, the ship was similar to another Brown ship, USS Chillicothe, except for its propulsion system.

== Service history ==
Indianola originally served on the Mississippi River and the Yazoo River. During the Vicksburg campaign, Union Navy Rear admiral David Dixon Porter ordered the naval ram USS Queen of the West down the Mississippi to intercept Confederate shipping on the stretch of the river between Vicksburg, Mississippi, and Port Hudson, Louisiana. Queen of the West travelled downriver past the Vicksburg guns on February 2, 1863, and operated there until February 5. The ram later made a second trip, and entered the Red River on February 14. Indianola was now under the command of Lieutenant Commander George Brown. The day before, Indianola left her moorings at the Yazoo at 22:15 with two barges loaded with coal strapped to her sides and steamed south under fire from the Vicksburg defenses. She was to join Queen of the West in her operations downstream. After passing the Confederate positions, Indianola anchored below Warrenton, Mississippi for the night and resumed the movement south. She had been chosen for the operation because her engines would allow her to make a speed of 2 knots (3.7 km/h; 2.3 mph) upstream against the current, which was much faster than Porter's other ironclads, meaning that Indianola would better be able to escape upriver in case of an emergency.

However, Queen of the West was disabled in a fight with Confederate shore defenses along the Red, and had to be abandoned, with her escaping crew occupying the captured packet steamer Era No. 5. They were pursued by the Confederate ram CSS William H. Webb, but managed to reach the safety of Indianola on February 16. While Era No. 5 headed backed towards Union positions near Vicksburg, Indianola moved against William H. Webb and sighted her that afternoon near Ellis Cliffs, Mississippi. Indianola fired, but was out of range, while the Confederate vessel escaped around a bend of the river in fog. Indianola then held a blockade of the junction of the Red and the Mississippi, but withdrew on February 21 after learning that William H. Webb, the captured and repaired Queen of the West, and two steamers filled with Confederate soldiers were moving to attack her.

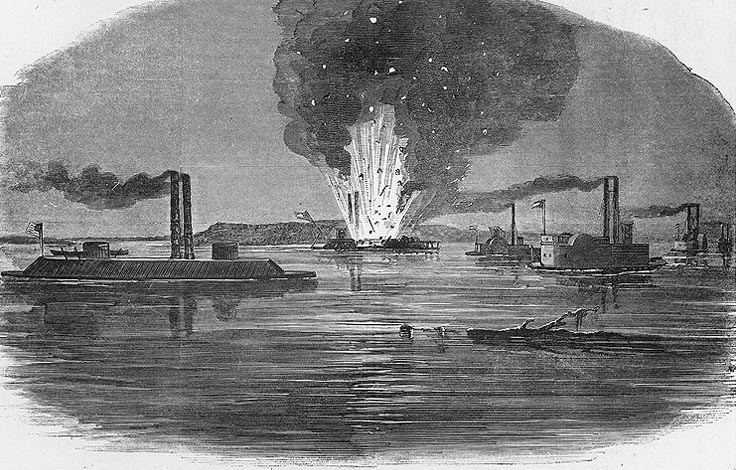
USS Indianola explodes in a sketch by Theodore R. Davis, published in Harper's Weekly in 1863.

Slowed by the two coal barges which she was still bringing with her in the belief that Porter might send down another vessel and the coal would be needed, Indianola was caught on the night of February 24 by William H. Webb and Queen of the West. The two Confederate vessels, under the command of Joseph Lancaster Brent, a major in the Confederate Army, could have reached Indianola earlier, but waited until nightfall for combat, in order to make it harder for the Union vessel to aim and to give the Confederate shore batteries at Grand Gulf, Mississippi a chance to fire on the ship. Near Davis Bend, Mississippi, Brown turned the prow of his ship towards the Confederate vessels and prepared for combat by positioning the ship so that one of the coal barges was between Indianola and the Confederates. After shots from the Union 11-inch guns missed, Queen of the West rammed Indianola on her port side and smashed one of the coal barges almost in half. The Union sailors cut away the stricken barge, and then suffered the shock of a head-on ramming from William H. Webb; the Confederate ship was damaged in the collision but made another charge and crushed the other coal barge. Queen of the West moved upstream to build momentum and then rammed the starboard side of Indianola, destroying the starboard rudder and wheelhouse. William H. Webb performed a similar maneuver, and damaged the stern of the Union vessel. Brown had ordered his ship to fire, but was only able to score either a single hit on the Queen of the West, which inflicted casualties but caused little structural damage or two hits on the Queen of the West that disabled cannons and a hit on William H. Webb. With the ship sinking and barely steerable, Brown had Indianola run aground onto the western bank and hauled down his flag, but the Confederates were able to pull the stricken ship over to the eastern bank, which they held. Indianola sunk in 10 feet (3.0 m) of water. During the fight, Indianola had been rammed seven times. While all but one Union sailor survived the battle, only three escaped the ship's capture to bring word to Porter; Brown and most of the others had been taken prisoner.

The Confederates detached a salvage crew to attempt to raise Indianola. The Union authorities knew that if the vessel was repaired and added to the Confederate fleet like Queen of the West, the result could be disastrous for the Union fleet on the Mississippi as the two captured vessels could potentially defeat and capture other Union ships. Porter did not have ships available to send on the risky mission to destroy the wreck of Indianola, so he ordered the construction of a hoax ironclad in order to bluff the Confederate salvage crew into abandoning the wreck. This was accomplished by lengthening an old coal barge with logs and adding a casemate, Quaker guns, and two smokestacks made out of pork barrels. The contraption, which was known by the name Black Terror, was sent downstream on February 26. It passed the Vicksburg defenses without taking major damage, and frightened Queen of the West into leaving the area of the wreck. The abandoned Confederate salvage crew, who may have been intoxicated, threw the 9-inch guns into the Mississippi, pointed the 11-inch guns at each other muzzle-to-muzzle and then fired them, before burning what remained to the waterline. On the morning of February 27, the Confederates realized that Black Terror had only been a hoax. Vicksburg fell to Union forces on July 4. The remains of Indianola's wreck were raised on January 5, 1865, and towed to Mound City, Illinois, where they were sold on January 17.

== Sources ==
- Barnhart, Donald L. (September 2003). "Admiral Porter's Ironclad Hoax". America's Civil War. 16 (4): 30–37. ISSN 1046-2899.
- Blair, Jayne E. (2014). The Essential Civil War: A Handbook to the Battles, Navies, Armies, and Commanders. Lanham, Maryland: McFarland. p. 258. ISBN 9781476606767.
- Budd, Nicholas F. (2014). Adaption of the Vessels of the Western Gunboat Flotilla to the Circumstances of Riverine Warfare During the American Civil War. Golden Springs Publishing. p. 55. ISBN 9781782895947.
- Foote, Shelby (1995) [1963]. The Beleaguered City: The Vicksburg Campaign (Modern Library ed.). New York: The Modern Library. ISBN 0-679-60170-8.
- Kennedy, Frances H., ed. (1998). The Civil War Battlefield Guide (2nd ed.). Boston/New York: Houghton Mifflin. ISBN 978-0-395-74012-5.
- Konstam, Angus (2012). Union River Ironclad 1861–65. Osprey. p. 45. ISBN 9781782009054.
- Miller, Donald L. (2019). Vicksburg: Grant's Campaign that Broke the Confederacy. New York, New York: Simon and Schuster. ISBN 978-1-4516-4139-4.
- Milligan, John Drane (1961). The Federal Freshwater Navy and the Opening of the Mississippi River: Its Organization, Construction, and Operations Through the Fall of Vicksburg (PhD thesis). Ann Arbor, Michigan: University of Michigan. ProQuest 302104357.
- Shea, William L.; Winschel, Terrence J. (2003). Vicksburg Is the Key: The Struggle for the Mississippi River. Lincoln, Nebraska: University of Nebraska Press. ISBN 978-0-8032-9344-1.
