= George Brown (admiral) =

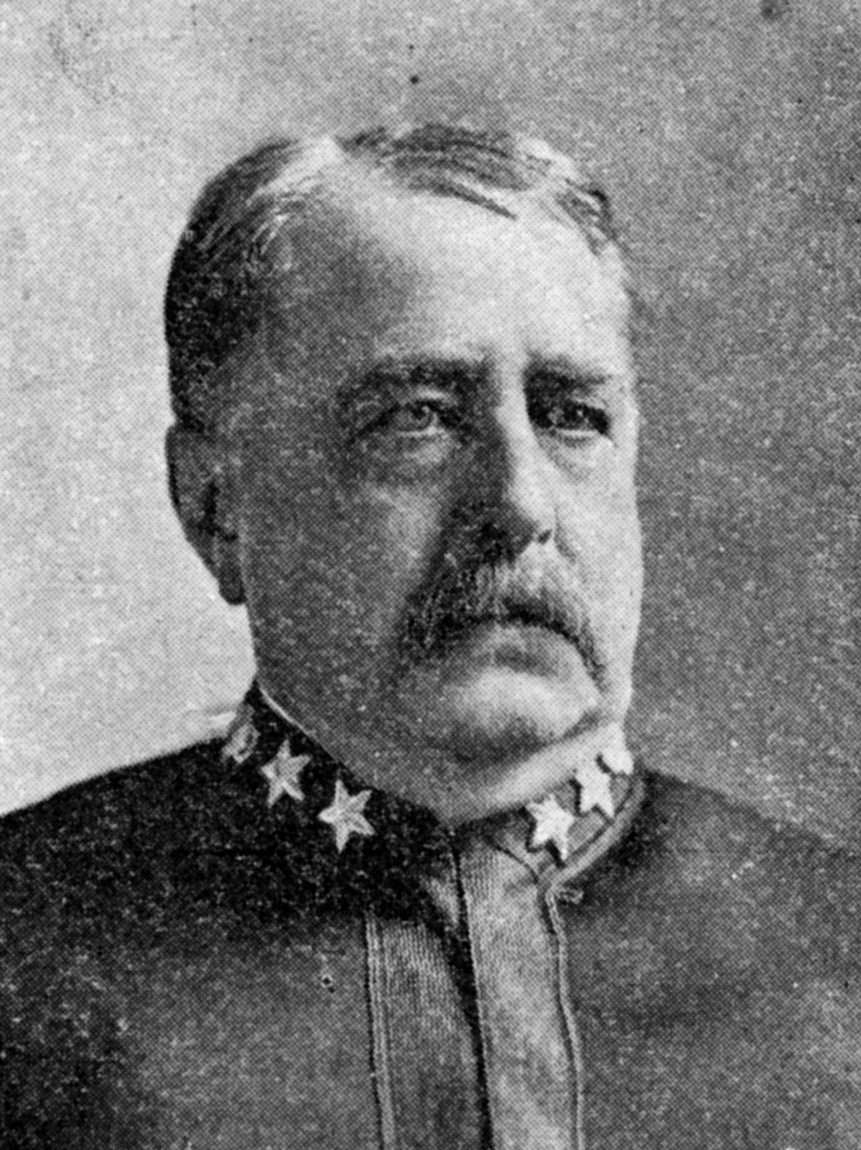
- Born: June 19, 1835; Rushville, Indiana, U.S.
- Died: June 29, 1913 (aged 78); Indianapolis, Indiana, U.S.
- Burial place: Crown Hill Cemetery and Arboretum, Indianapolis, Indiana U.S. Section 6, Lot 1
- Military career
- Allegiance: United States
- Branch: United States Navy
- Service years: 1849–1897
- Rank: Rear admiral
- Commands: USS Octorara; USS Indianola; USS Itasca; USS Michigan; Department of Alaska; Norfolk Navy Yard; Pacific Squadron
- Conflicts: American Civil War

Rear Admiral George Brown (June 19, 1835 – June 29, 1913) was an officer of the United States Navy who served during the American Civil War.

== Biography ==
Brown was born in Rushville, Indiana, and entered the navy as a midshipman on February 5, 1849. He subsequently served aboard the Cumberland in the Mediterranean Squadron (1849–1851) and St. Lawrence in the Pacific Squadron (1851–1854). He graduated from the United States Naval Academy in 1855.

He served throughout the Civil War, first as inspector of ordnance for the Powhatan (rank lieutenant), then as commander of the Octorara with the North Atlantic Blockading Squadron, during which time he was promoted to lieutenant commander. He especially distinguished himself on the night of February 24, 1863, when, in command of the river gunboat Indianola at Palmyra Island, he defended himself for an hour and a half against four Confederate gunboats. He was wounded and taken prisoner, and his vessel was destroyed. He was held at Libby Prison in Richmond, Virginia until exchanged in May 1863. He commandeered and armed the civilian vessel Union at Marion, Indiana for defense against Morgan's Raiders in July 1863. Later he commanded the Itasca at the Battle of Mobile Bay in 1864.

After the war, Brown was promoted to commander in July 1866. He conveyed the former CSS Stonewall to Japan, to which it had been sold. From 1870 to 1872, Brown served as the commanding officer of the sidewheel steamer Michigan. He also was elected a First Class Companion of the Indiana Commandery of the Military Order of the Loyal Legion of the United States.

Brown became a captain in April 1877, after being appointed to command the Department of Alaska, and was promoted to commodore in September 1887 and rear admiral in September 1893. He commanded the Pacific Squadron from January 1890 to January 1893.

In June and July 1891 he was in Chilean waters involved in the Itata Incident which was a diplomatic affair and military incident involving the United States and Chile during the 1891 Chilean Civil War. The incident concerned an attempted arms shipment by the rebel ship Itata from the U.S. to Chile. He was accused by opponents of the administration of having gone beyond his public orders to become involved in intrigues with the combatants. Theodore Roosevelt defends Brown from these charges in his book, Campaigns and Controversies.

Brown was commandant of the Norfolk Navy Yard in 1886–90, and again in 1893–97, when he retired to Indianapolis. There, he served as president of the Indianapolis Street Railway Company. Brown died from heart disease at his home in the Woodruff Place neighborhood. He was interred at the Crown Hill Cemetery.

== Personal life ==
Brown's wife was Kate Morris. Two of his sons, George Jr. and Hugh, became officers in the U.S. Navy.

== Dates of rank ==
- Midshipman – 5 February 1849
- Passed midshipman – 12 June 1855
- Master – 16 September 1855
- Lieutenant – 2 June 1856
- Lieutenant commander – 16 July 1862
- Commander – 25 July 1866
- Captain – 25 April 1877
- Commodore – 4 September 1887
- Rear admiral – 27 September 1893
- Retired list – 19 June 1897
