= CSS St. Patrick =

Submersible torpedo boat

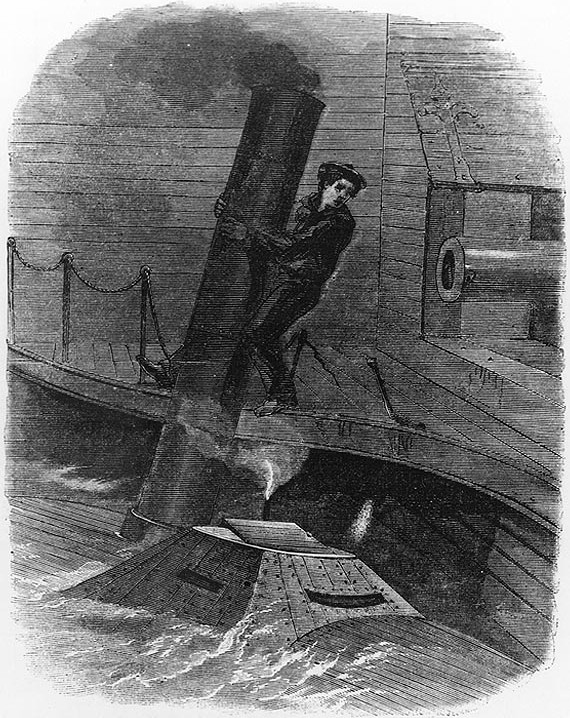
- St. Patrick attacks USS Octorara

History

Confederate States
- Name: St. Patrick
- Namesake: Saint Patrick
- Operator: Confederate States Navy
- Fate: Unknown

General characteristics
- Type: Steam submarine torpedo boat
- Length: 30 ft (9.1 m)
- Beam: unknown
- Draft: unknown
- Installed power: Steam engine on surface, hand-crank when submerged.
- Speed: unknown
- Complement: 6 men.
- Armament: One spar torpedo.

CSS St. Patrick, a submersible torpedo boat which could "be sunk and raised as desired," was built privately at Selma, Alabama, by John P. Halligan in 1864. She was transferred to the Confederate States Army on 24 January 1865, but placed under the command of Lt. J. T. Walker, CSN. An hour after midnight on 28 January this little vessel struck the Federal ship USS Octorara abaft her wheelhouse with a torpedo which misfired and did no damage. When the Federals returned artillery and musket fire St. Patrick escaped to the protection of the Confederate batteries at Mobile.
