= USS Octorara (1861) =

Gunboat of the United States Navy

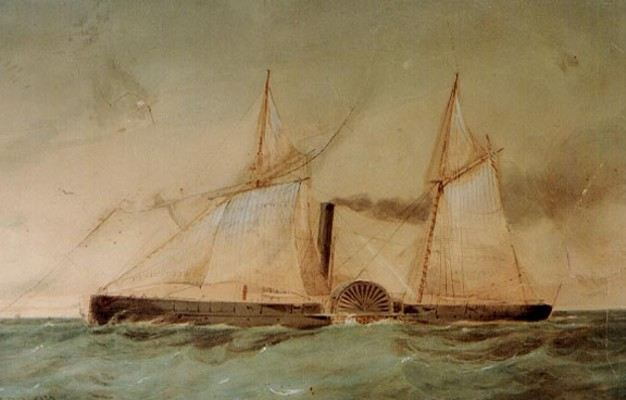
- Watercolor of USS Octorara by Alex Stuart.

History

United States
- Name: Octorara
- Namesake: A creek in Pennsylvania named for an Indian word meaning running water.
- Builder: Brooklyn Navy Yard
- Laid down: date unknown
- Launched: 7 December 1861
- Commissioned: 28 February 1862
- Decommissioned: 5 August 1865 at New York City
- Stricken: 1866 (est.)
- Fate: Sold, 9 November 1866

General characteristics
- Displacement: 829 tons
- Length: 193 ft 2 in (58.88 m)
- Beam: 34 ft 6 in (10.52 m)
- Draught: 4 ft 9.5 in (1.461 m)
- Propulsion: steam engine; side-wheel propelled
- Speed: 11 knots
- Complement: 102 officers and enlisted
- Armament: one 80-pounder Parrott rifle; one 9-inch Dahlgren smoothbore gun; four 24-pounder guns
- Notes: Ship was double ended.

USS Octorara was a steamer acquired by the Union Navy during the American Civil War. She was used by the Navy to patrol navigable waterways of the Confederacy to prevent the Confederates from trading with other countries.

== Built at the Brooklyn Navy Yard ==
Octorara was launched by the Brooklyn Navy Yard 7 December 1861, sponsored by Miss Emma Hartt, daughter of Naval Constructor E. Hartt; and commissioned 28 February 1862, Lt. George Brown in command.

== Civil War service ==
=== Assigned to the North Atlantic Blockade ===
The new double-ended, side-wheel steamer departed New York City 17 March 1862 and served briefly on blockade duty with the North Atlantic Blockading Squadron before reporting to Commander David D. Porter at Ship Island, Mississippi.

=== Reassigned to the Mississippi River action at Vicksburg ===
She acted as flagship for David Dixon Porter's Mortar Flotilla during Flag Officer David Farragut's expedition up the Mississippi River to attack Vicksburg, Mississippi. Before dawn 28 June, Porter's ships opened fire on the Confederate fortress and shelled the southern batteries while Farragut dashed by the river stronghold.

At the height of the fight, Octorara became unmanageable when her wheel ropes jammed. She drifted down stream into USS Brooklyn's line of fire. She was damaged when shells from the steam sloop of war burst off her port beam.

=== Repaired at Baltimore and returned to the East Coast blockade ===
On 24 July, en route to Baltimore, Maryland, for repairs, she captured Tubal Cain east of Savannah, Georgia, as the British blockade running steamer tried to slip into Charleston, South Carolina, with munitions.

Back in top fighting trim early in September, Octorara, commanded by Comdr. Napoleon Collins, was assigned to a "flying squadron" formed under Commodore Charles Wilkes to hunt Confederate commerce raiders CSS Alabama and CSS Florida. During the ensuing year she captured nine Confederate and British blockade runners.

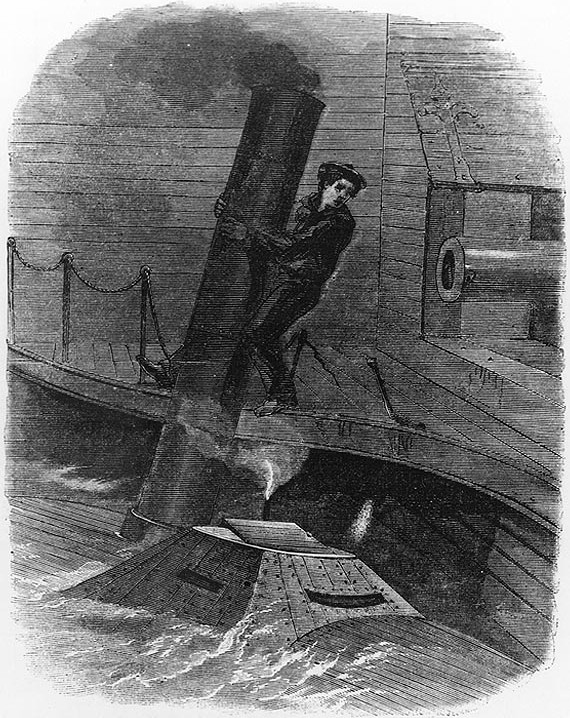
Unsuccessful attack on USS Octorara by the Confederate torpedo boat St. Patrick, 28 January 1865, in Mobile Bay, Alabama.

=== West Gulf Blockading Squadron operations ===
On 11 September 1863 Lt. Comdr. W. W. Low relieved Comdr. Collins of command of Octorara. Arriving New Orleans, Louisiana, 19 October 1863, the steamer joined the West Gulf Blockading Squadron. From November to March 1864, she assisted in the blockade of Mobile, Alabama, bombarding Fort Powell at the entrance to Mississippi Sound 16–29 February.

On 5 August Octorara participated in the Battle of Mobile Bay, passing Fort Morgan lashed to Brooklyn. Farragut's squadron drove past the forts into the bay, engaged and captured the Confederate ram CSS Tennessee and the gunboat CSS Selma. Octorara received 17 hits during the engagement. Her casualties numbered 1 killed and 10 wounded. She continued to operate in the vicinity of Mobile until July 1865, firing on fortifications and taking part in the capture of the city 12 April 1865.

== Post-war decommissioning and sale ==
Octorara sailed 20 July arriving New York City the 29th, decommissioned 5 August 1865 and was sold 9 November 1866.
