= 77th Illinois Infantry Regiment =

77th Regiment Illinois Volunteer Infantry
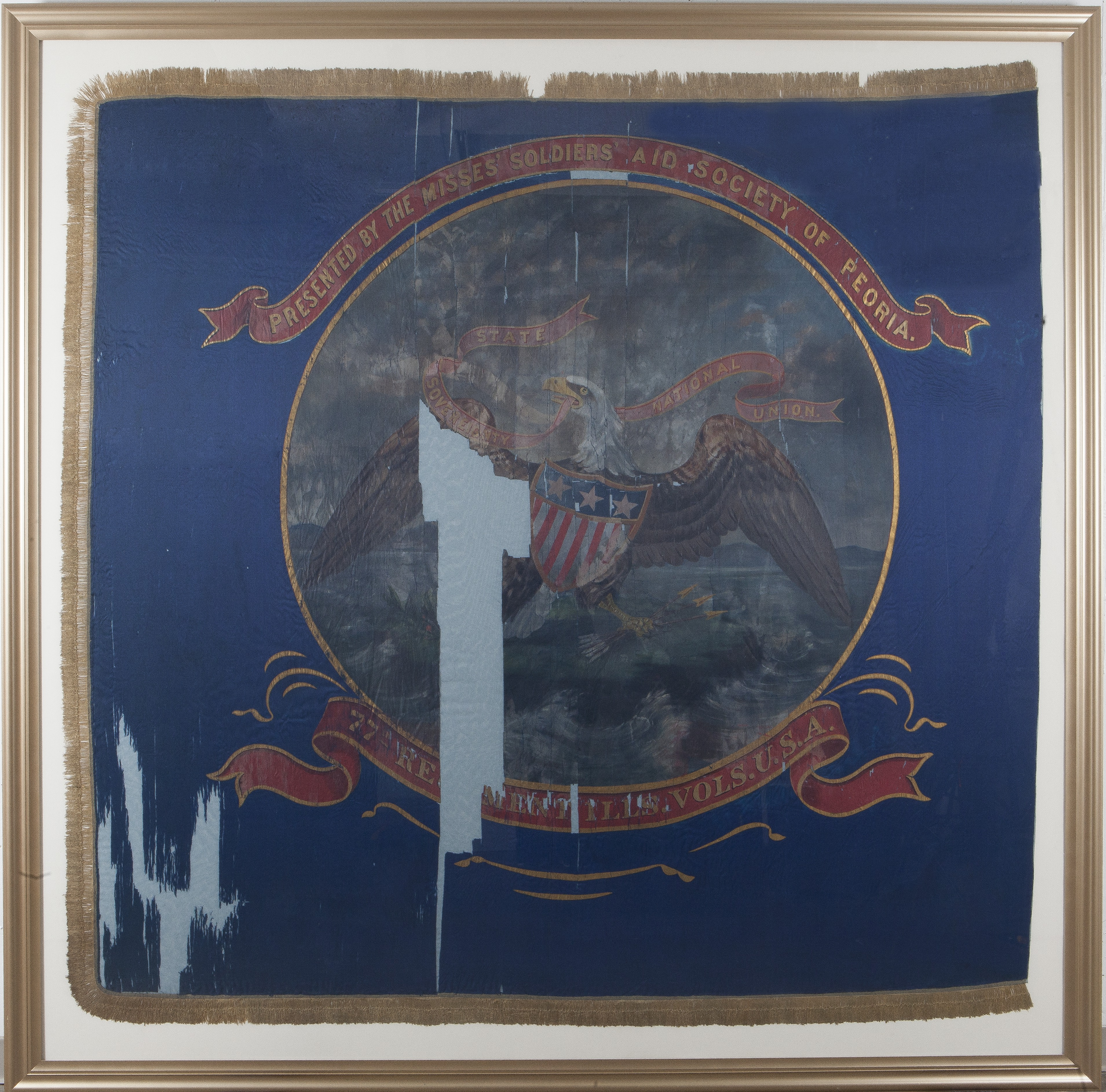
- Regimental Flag of the 77th Illinois Infantry
- Active: September 3, 1862, to July 10, 1865
- Country: United States
- Allegiance: Union
- Branch: Infantry
- Engagements: Battle of Port Gibson; Siege of Vicksburg; Battle of Champion Hill; Red River Campaign

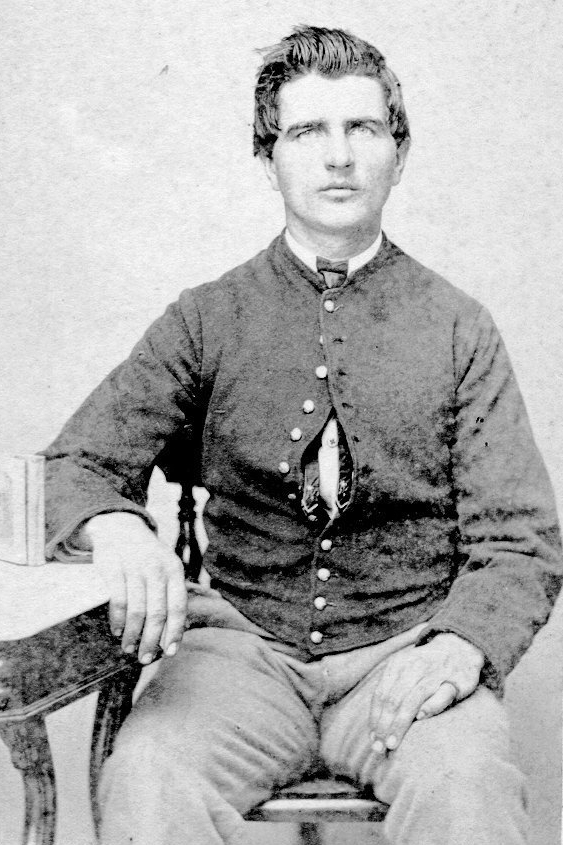
Collins P. Waterman (1838-1910), Co. H of the 77th Illinois Volunteer Infantry Regiment; enlisted 11 August 1862; mustered out 10 July 1865

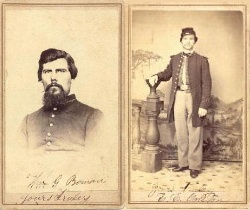
Two soldiers of the 77th Illinois

The 77th Regiment Illinois Volunteer Infantry was an infantry regiment that served in the Union Army during the American Civil War.

== Service ==
77th Regiment Illinois was organized at Peoria, Illinois and mustered into Federal service on September 3, 1862.

Serving under Maj. Gen. Gordon Granger, the 77th Illinois Volunteers participated in the bloody initial phase of the Vicksburg Campaign, during which several days of futile Union attacks were launched before a protracted siege was made and won. After participating in the first Vicksburg battles, the 77th was part of the group of Union troops marched to the east, where on May 14, 1863, they took part in the Battle of Jackson, Mississippi, leading to the fall of that city.

This success was followed the next spring by a catastrophe, however. In April 1864, having marched into Louisiana towards Alexandria, the unit was isolated and crushed in a cavalry support operation at the Battle of Sabine Cross-roads. Some 176 officers and men of the 77th Illinois were killed, wounded, or captured, leaving only 125 members of the regiment fit for duty.

The regiment was discharged from service on July 10, 1865, having participated in 16 battles.

== Total strength and casualties ==
The regiment suffered 2 officers and 66 enlisted men who were killed in action or mortally wounded and 1 officer and 137 enlisted men who died of disease, for a total of 206 fatalities.

== Commanders ==
- Colonel Charles Ballance - Declined commission.
- Colonel David Perkins Grier - Mustered out with the regiment.

== See also ==
- List of Illinois Civil War Units
- Illinois in the American Civil War
