= CSS Webb =

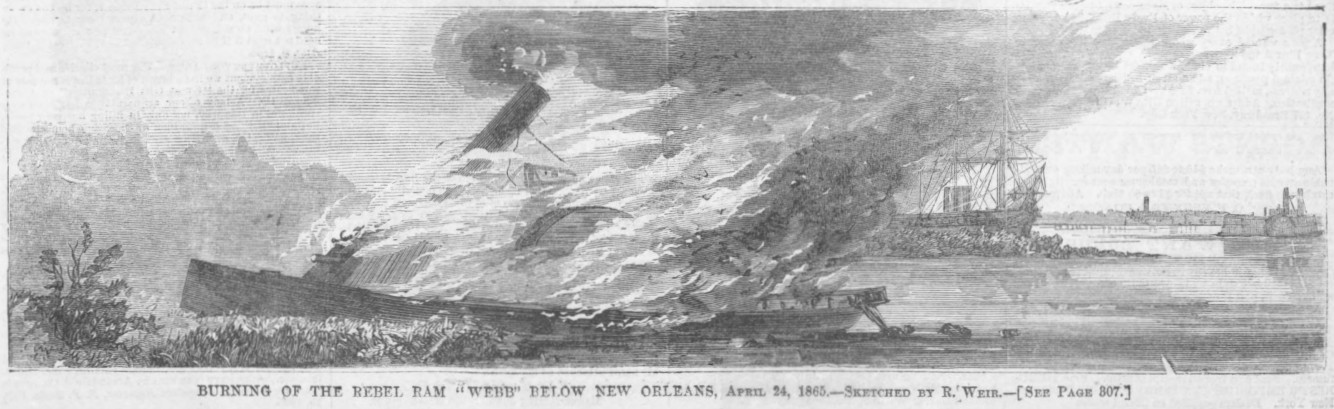
- An engraving of the burning of the CSS Webb is one of the few known images of the vessel

History

Confederate States
- Name: Webb
- Namesake: William Henry Webb
- Operator: Confederate States Army; Confederate States Navy
- Builder: William Henry Webb, New York City
- Launched: 1856
- Acquired: May 1861
- Commissioned: 1865
- Fate: Burned to avoid capture, April 1865

General characteristics
- Type: Side-wheel River Steamer
- Displacement: 655 tons

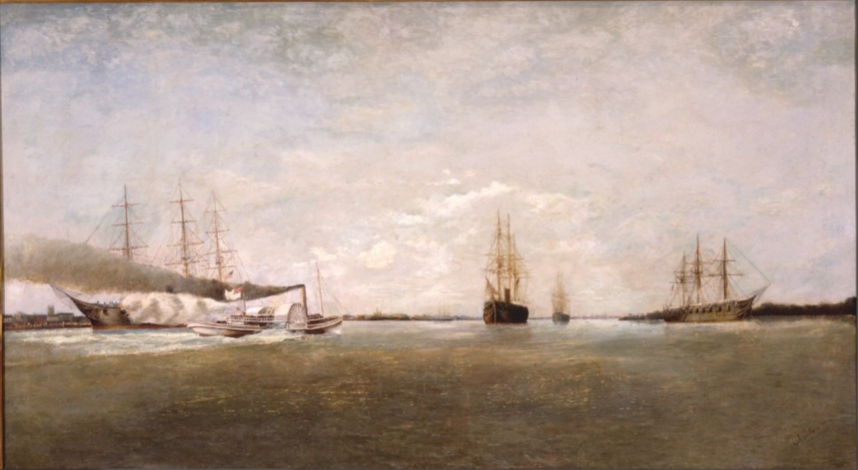
The Webb Running the Blockade, by William Lindsey Challoner

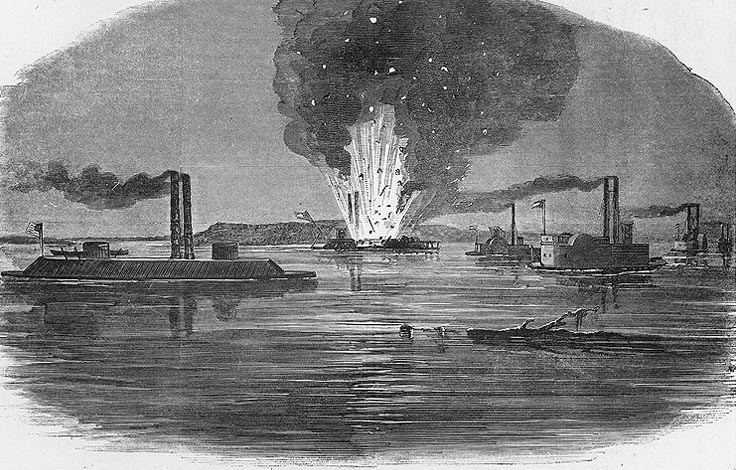
The CSS Queen of the West destroys the Indianola, there is also the Webb and the Black Terror.

CSS Webb, a 655-ton side-wheel steam ram, was originally built in New York City in 1856 as the civilian steamship William H. Webb. She received a Confederate privateer's commission at New Orleans in May 1861, but was instead employed as a transport until January 1862. Converted to a "cotton clad" ram by the Confederate Army, thereafter served on the Mississippi and Red Rivers. On February 24, 1863, under the command of Captain Charles Pierce, she participated in the sinking of the Federal ironclad USS Indianola. Webb was transferred to the Confederate Navy in early 1865. On April 23–24, 1865, under the command of Charles S. Read, Webb broke through the Federal blockade at the mouth of the Red River, Louisiana, and made a dramatic run down the Mississippi toward the Gulf of Mexico. After eluding several United States Navy vessels and passing New Orleans, she was confronted by the powerful steam sloop USS Richmond. Rather than face the veteran ship's broadside, the Webb was run ashore and destroyed by her crew.

== See also ==
- Blockade runners of the American Civil War
- List of ships of the Confederate States Navy
- Confederate River Defense Fleet
- Mississippi River campaigns
- Red River Campaign

== Sources ==
- Stern, Philip Van Doren (1962). The Confederate Navy. Doubleday & Company.
- Scharf, J. Thomas (1887). History of the Confederate States Navy. New York: Rogers & Sherwood.
