= Peter U. Murphey =

Peter Umstead Murphey
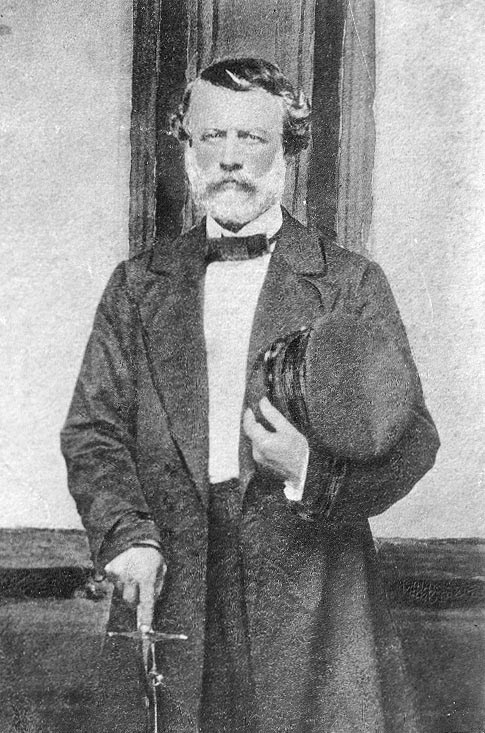
- First Lieutenant Peter U. Murphey, CSN
- Born: Caswell County, North Carolina
- Relatives: Archibald Murphey (father)
- Military career
- Allegiance: United States of America; Virginia; Confederate States of America
- Branch: United States Navy; Virginia Naval Militia; Confederate States Navy
- Service years: 1834–1861 (USN); 1861–1865 (CSN)
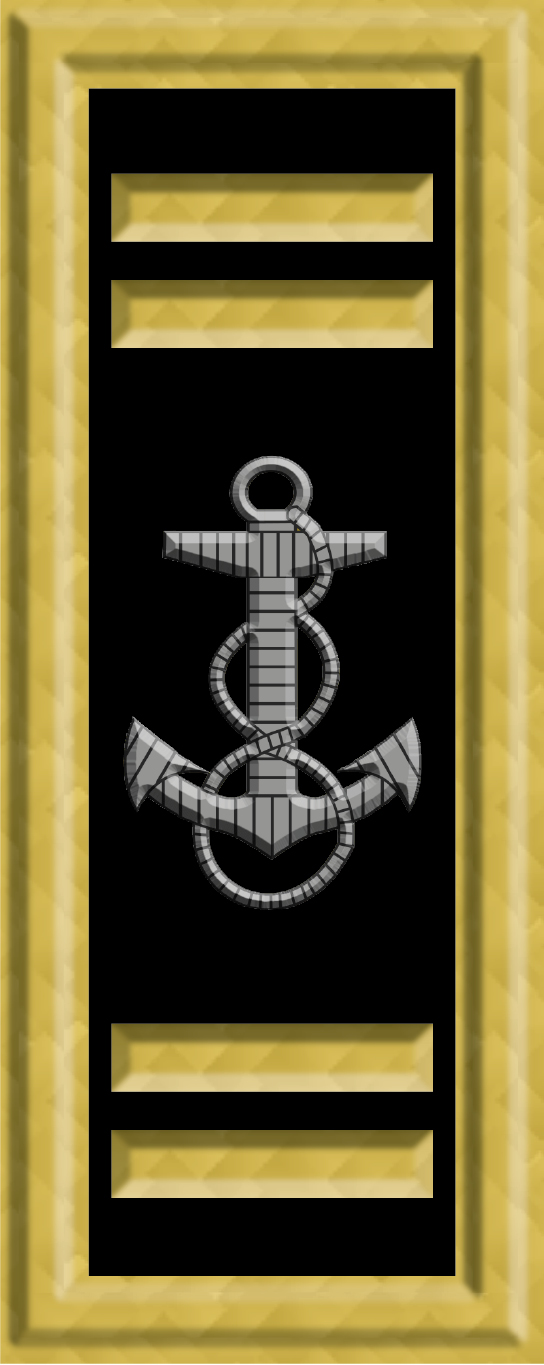
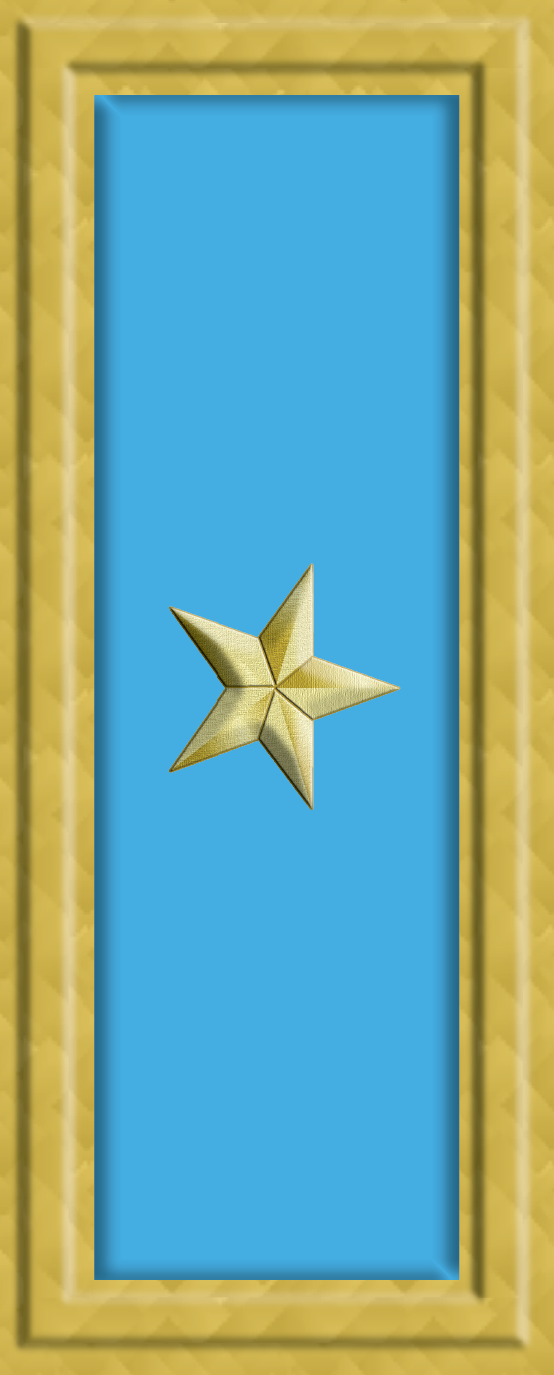
- Rank: Lieutenant Lieutenant
- Commands: Arrow; CSS Morgan; CSS Selma
- Conflicts: American Civil War

Peter Umstead Murphey (born July 20, 1810, in Caswell County, North Carolina; died 1876) was a former officer of the United States Navy who joined the Confederate States Navy during the American Civil War. He was the son of Archibald DeBow Murphey and Jane Armistead Murphey.

== Biography ==
Murphey (sometimes incorrectly spelled Murphy) was born in Caswell County, North Carolina, the son of State Senator Archibald Debow Murphey and Jane Debow. Appointed from that state as a United States Navy midshipman on May 12, 1834, he was promoted to passed midshipman on July 8, 1839, and to the rank of lieutenant on May 29, 1846. Murphey resigned from the U.S. Navy, in which he served as an instructor at the Norfolk Military Academy in Norfolk, Va., in April 1861.

In April 1861 he joined the Virginia State Navy, and was appointed commander of the steam tug Arrow on picket duty in the vicinity of Craney Island. Murphey became a Confederate States Navy officer on 10 June 1861, with the rank of first lieutenant. After working on naval defenses in Virginia and North Carolina, he served at the Gosport Navy Yard in 1861–62, and then commanded the gunboat CSS Morgan in the Mobile Squadron from March 7, 1862.

Murphey assumed command of the gunboat CSS Selma in July 1862, and was wounded when Selma was captured in the Battle of Mobile Bay on August 5, 1864, by a U.S. Navy squadron headed by Admiral David Farragut. Murphey, who was fondly referred to by his crew and fellow officers as "Captain Pat", was held as a prisoner of war at Fort Warren, until exchanged at Cox Wharf, Virginia, on October 18, 1864. He surrendered to Union forces on May 4, 1865, and was paroled on May 10, 1865. Murphey died Aug. 13, 1876, near Mobile, to where he returned after the war.
