= CSS Selma =

Steamboat in the Confederate States Navy

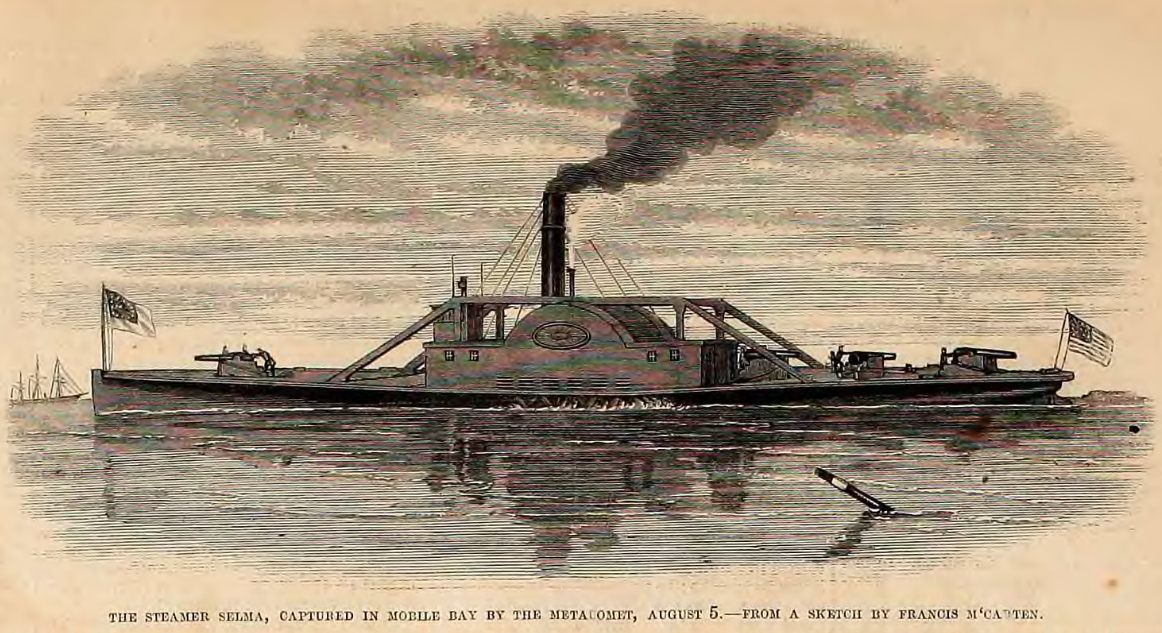
- CSS Selma

History

Confederate States
- Name: Florida; Selma
- Namesake: Florida; Selma, Alabama
- Operator: Confederate States Navy
- Launched: 1856
- Commissioned: 1861
- Renamed: Selma, July 1862
- Fate: Captured at Battle of Mobile Bay, 5 August 1864

United States
- Name: Selma
- Operator: Union Navy
- Acquired: 5 August 1864
- Decommissioned: 16 July 1865
- Fate: Sold into merchant service 16 July 1865; Sunk 24 June 1868

General characteristics
- Displacement: 590 tons
- Length: 252 ft (77 m)
- Beam: 30 ft (9.1 m)
- Draft: 6 ft (1.8 m)
- Propulsion: Steam engine
- Speed: 9 knots (17 km/h)
- Complement: 65 to 99 officers and men
- Armament: 2 × 9 in (230 mm) smoothbore cannons; 1 × 8 in (200 mm) smoothbore cannon; 1 × 6.4 in (160 mm) rifled cannon
- Armor: 3/8 in (9.5 mm) iron deck plating

CSS Selma was a steamship in the Confederate States Navy during the American Civil War. She served in the Confederate Navy first as Florida, and later as Selma. She was captured by the Union Navy steamer USS Metacomet during the Battle of Mobile Bay. She served as USS Selma until the end of the war, when she was decommissioned and sold for use as a merchant ship.

== Construction and conversion ==
Selma was built as the coastwise packet Florida at Mobile, Alabama in 1856 for the Mobile Mail Line. She was inspected and accepted by Captain Lawrence Rousseau, CSN, on April 22, 1861, acquired by the Confederacy in June, cut down and strengthened by hog frames and armed as a gunboat — all, apparently, in the Lake Pontchartrain area. Her upper deck was plated at this time with 3/8-inch (9.5 mm) iron, partially protecting her boilers, of the low pressure type preferred for fuel economy and greater safety in battle. CSS Florida is cited on November 12, 1861, as already in commission and serving Commodore G. N. Rollins' New Orleans defense flotilla under command of Lieutenant Charles W. Hays, CSN.

The Mobile Evening News editorialized early in December on the startling change "from her former gay, first-class hotel appearance, having been relieved of her upper works and painted as black as the inside of her smokestack. She carries a jib forward and, we suppose, some steering sail aft, when requisite."

== Service as Florida ==
Although much of Florida's time was spent blockaded in Mobile, she made some forays into Mississippi Sound, two of which alarmed the United States Navy's entire Gulf command. On October 19, Florida convoyed a merchantman outside. Fortunately for her, the coast was clear of Union ships and batteries, for Florida fouled the area's main military telegraph line with her anchor, and had no sooner repaired the damage than she went aground for 36 hours. Luck returning, she tried out her guns on USS Massachusetts, "a large three-masted propeller" she mistook for the faster R. R. Cuyler. Being of shallower draft and greater speed, she successfully dodged Massachusetts in shoal water off Ship Island. The havoc caused by one well-placed shot with her rifled pivot gun is described by Commander Melancton Smith, USN, commanding Massachusetts;

It entered the starboard side abaft the engine five feet above the water line, cutting entirely through 18 planks of the main deck, carried away the table, sofas, eight sections of iron steam pipe, and exploded in the stateroom on the port side, stripping the bulkheads of four rooms, and setting fire to the vessel ... 12 pieces of the fragments have been collected and weigh 58 pounds.

The first sortie by Florida caused consternation. Captain Levin M. Powell, USN, in command at Ship Island — soon to be main advance base for the New Orleans campaign — wrote to Flag Officer William McKean, October 22;

The first of the reported gun steamers made her experimental trial trip on the Massachusetts, and, if she be a sample of the rest, you may perhaps consider that Ship Island and the adjacent waters will require a force of a special kind in order to hold them to our use. The caliber and long range of the rifled cannon from which the shell that exploded in the Massachusetts was fired established the ability of these fast steam gunboats to keep out of the range of all broadside guns, and enables them to disregard the armament or magnitude of all ships thus armed, or indeed any number of them, when sheltered by shoal water.

Protecting CSS Pamilico, in contrasting white dress and laden with some 400 troops, "the black rebel steamer" Florida on December 4 had a brush with USS Montgomery in Horn Island Pass that caused jubilation in the Southern press. Commander T. Darrah Shaw of Montgomery, finding his 10-inch (250 mm) shell gun no match for Florida's long-range rifles, signaled Commander Melancton Smith for assistance, and when it was not forthcoming, ran back to safety under the guns of Ship Island. Shaw saved Montgomery and lost his command for fleeing from the enemy. Commodore McKean promptly sent Lieutenant James Edward Jouett to relieve him and forwarded Shaw's action report to United States Secretary of the Navy Gideon Welles, noting, "It needs no comment." Crowed Richmond Dispatch on December 14, quoting Mobile Evening News, "The Florida fought at great disadvantage in one respect, owing to her steering apparatus being out of order, but showed a decided superiority in the effectiveness of her armament. That gun which scared the Massachusetts so badly, and had nearly proved fatal to her, is evidently a better piece or must be better handled than any which the enemy have."

== Service as Selma ==
With the advent of cruiser CSS Florida, she was renamed Selma in July 1862, Lieutenant Peter U. Murphey, CSN, assuming command.

On February 5, 1863, while steaming down Mobile Bay with 100 extra men in search of a blockader to carry by boarding, Selma was bilged by a snag in crossing Dog River Bar, entrance to Mobile, and sank in 8 feet of water. Pumped out hastily, she was back in service February 13.

By the following year, Selma, CSS Morgan and CSS Gaines, the only ships capable of defending lower Mobile Bay, were having a serious problem with deserting seamen, and intelligence reported Selma's crew as having fallen as low as 15 men about mid-February.

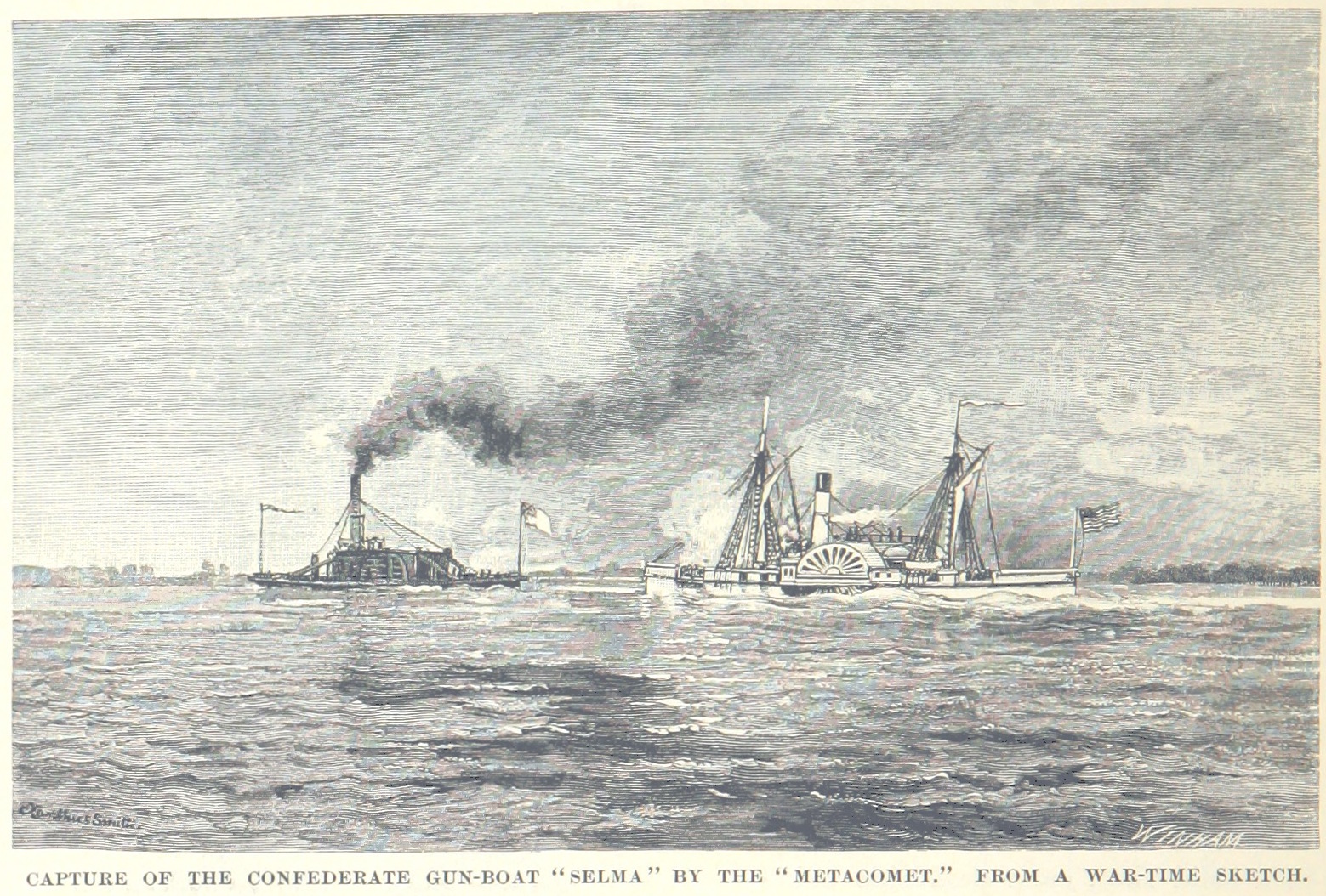
Selma is captured by Metacomet

At the crucial Battle of Mobile Bay, the largest naval engagement of the Civil War on August 5, 1864, Selma, captained by Lt. Peter Umstead "Capt. Pat" Murphey, was one of three small Confederate gunboats present. She particularly annoyed Rear Admiral David Farragut, USN by a steady, raking fire as she stood off USS Hartford's bow. After passing the forts, Farragut ordered gunboat USS Metacomet, captained by James Jouett, cast loose from Hartford to pursue Selma. After an hour-long running fight, Murphey, unable to escape to shallow water, had to surrender to the faster, more heavily armed Metacomet. Selma lost 7 killed and 8 wounded, including Murphey, who suffered an injured arm. The Selma was the last Confederate ship to surrender at the Battle of Mobile Bay.

That evening, Admiral Farragut commissioned the prize gunboat as USS Selma and placed her under the command of Arthur R. Yates, USN. Five days later, Selma joined in the Union Navy's bombardment of Fort Morgan. On August 16, she participated in a reconnaissance expedition up the Dog River.

In January 1865, Selma was transferred to New Orleans where she served until decommissioned on July 16, 1865. Sold at auction the same day to G. A. Hall, Selma was redocumented for merchant service on August 17, 1865, and foundered on June 24, 1868, south of Galveston, Texas, off the mouth of the Brazos River.

== See also ==
- Union Navy
- Union Blockade
