= Warrenton, Mississippi =

- Unincorporated community
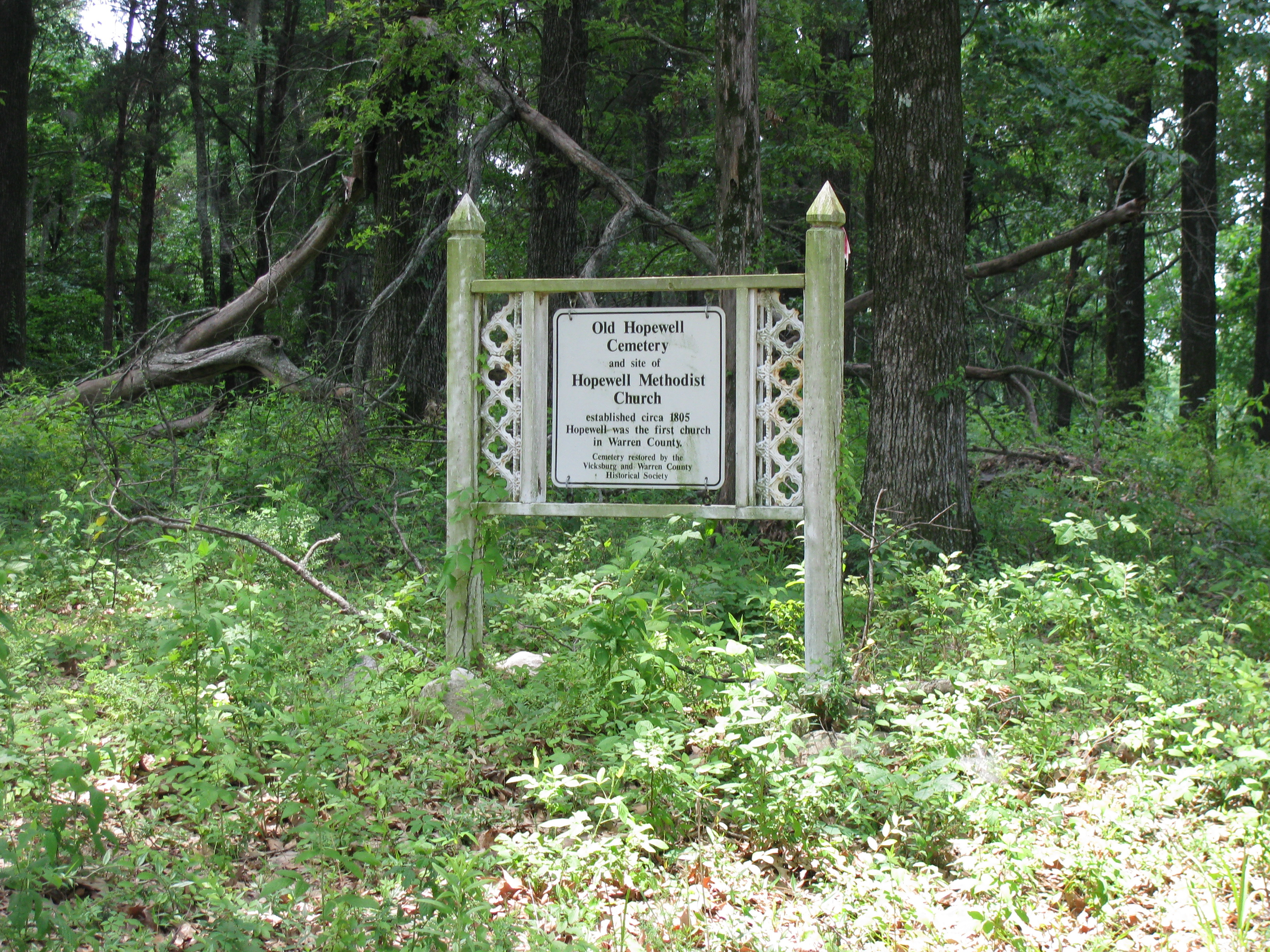
- Old Hopewell Cemetery

- Location within Mississippi Location within the United States
- Coordinates: 32°14′51″N 90°55′42″W
- Country: United States
- State: Mississippi
- County: Warren
- Elevation: 105 ft (32 m)
- Time zone: UTC-6 (Central (CST))
  - Summer (DST): UTC-5 (CDT)
- GNIS feature ID: 679355

Warrenton is an unincorporated community in Warren County, Mississippi. It is located approximately 5 miles south of Vicksburg on U.S. Route 61. Warrenton is part of the Vicksburg Micropolitan Statistical Area. The county seat of Warren County from 1809 to 1836 and an important shipping point along the Mississippi River in the 19th century, when the course of the river moved away from the town in declined. Little trace remains of the settlement today.

== History ==
The earliest settlement in this community was Hopewell Methodla Church and Cemetery, established in 1805. It was the first church in Warren County, and still exists a short distance east of Warrenton.

Warren County was organized in 1809, and Warrenton was selected to the county seat. A brick courthouse was constructed at Warrenton.

A post office was established in 1811, and the town incorporated in 1820, five years before nearby Walnut Hills incorporated as Vicksburg. At the time, Warrenton was the largest, most centrally located, and most important place in the county. Large cotton shipments went out from Warrenton in 1812. Nearby Vicksburg began to prosper due to its better landing, higher location, and more vigorous leadership. The county seat was moved there in 1825 (or 1836).

During the 1830s, Warrenton continued as a place of cotton export.

Due to the town's low-lying swampy location, it suffered from river floods and epidemics such as yellow fever, smallpox and cholera.

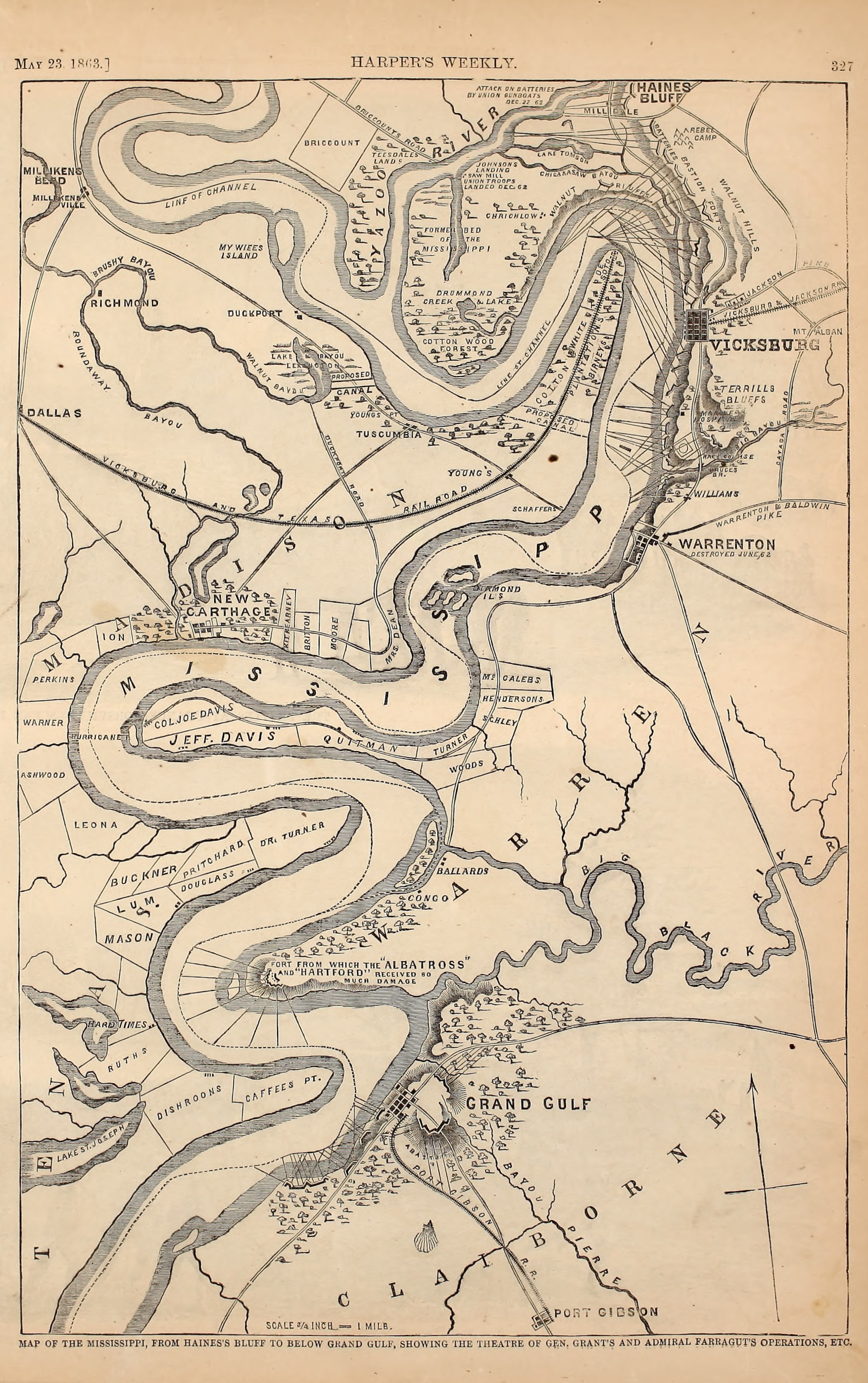
Warrenton on "Map of the Mississippi, from Haines's Bluff to Below Grand Gulf, Showing the Theatre of Gen. Grant's and Admiral Farragut's Operations"(Harper's Weekly, May 23, 1863)

During the Civil War, Confederate forces established a fortification at Warrenton. The town was badly damaged by shelling during the war.

Warrenton was a stop on the Vicksburg, Pensacola and Ship Island Railroad, constructed in the 1870s. After 1883, the river moved westward, leaving a sandbank between the town and its port. The town quickly declined. In 1903, the post office was removed.

Today, the community is a mix of agriculture and residential properties. Nothing remains of the original settlement but the Hopewell Church and Cemetery. The Vicksburg Airport is located at the south end of Warrenton.
